= Podgórze, Myślibórz County =

Podgórze
- Village
- Location within Poland
- Coordinates: 52°58′N 15°5′E
- Country: Poland
- Voivodeship: West Pomeranian
- County: Myślibórz
- Gmina: Barlinek
- Time zone: UTC+1 (CET)
  - Summer (DST): UTC+2 (CEST)
- Vehicle registration: ZMY

Podgórze [pɔdˈɡuʐɛ] is a village in the administrative district of Gmina Barlinek, in Myślibórz County, West Pomeranian Voivodeship, in northwestern Poland. It lies approximately 9 km (6 mi) southwest of Barlinek, 15 km (9 mi) east of Myślibórz, and 61 km (38 mi) southeast of the regional capital Szczecin.
