= Dzikowo, Myślibórz County =

Dzikowo
- Village
- Location within Poland
- Coordinates: 52°59′N 15°7′E
- Country: Poland
- Voivodeship: West Pomeranian
- County: Myślibórz
- Gmina: Barlinek

Dzikowo [d͡ʑiˈkɔvɔ] (German: Dieckow) is a village in the administrative district of Gmina Barlinek, within Myślibórz County, West Pomeranian Voivodeship, in north-western Poland. It lies approximately 6 km (4 mi) west of Barlinek, 18 km (11 mi) east of Myślibórz, and 60 km (37 mi) south-east of the regional capital Szczecin.

== Notable residents ==
- Karl Wilhelm Posselt (1815-1885), missionary
