= Rówienko, West Pomeranian Voivodeship =

Rówienko
- Village
- Location within Poland
- Coordinates: 53°2′4″N 15°9′9″E
- Country: Poland
- Voivodeship: West Pomeranian
- County: Myślibórz
- Gmina: Barlinek
- Population: 40

Rówienko [ruˈvʲɛŋkɔ] is a village in the administrative district of Gmina Barlinek, within Myślibórz County, West Pomeranian Voivodeship, in north-western Poland. It lies approximately 5 km (3 mi) north-west of Barlinek, 23 km (14 mi) north-east of Myślibórz, and 57 km (35 mi) south-east of the regional capital Szczecin.

For the history of the region, see History of Pomerania.

The village has a population of 40.
