= Nierybno, Myślibórz County =

Nierybno
- Settlement
- Location within Poland
- Coordinates: 53°0′4″N 15°8′31″E
- Country: Poland
- Voivodeship: West Pomeranian
- County: Myślibórz
- Gmina: Barlinek

Nierybno [ɲɛˈrɨbnɔ] is a settlement in the administrative district of Gmina Barlinek, within Myślibórz County, West Pomeranian Voivodeship, in northwestern Poland. It lies approximately 4 km (2 mi) west of Barlinek, 20 km (12 mi) east of Myślibórz, and 60 km (37 mi) south-east of the regional capital Szczecin.

For the history of the region, see History of Pomerania.
