= Żelice, West Pomeranian Voivodeship =

Żelice
- Settlement
- Location within Poland
- Coordinates: 53°2′38″N 15°2′38″E
- Country: Poland
- Voivodeship: West Pomeranian
- County: Myślibórz
- Gmina: Barlinek

Żelice [ʐɛˈlʲit͡sɛ] is a settlement in the administrative district of Gmina Barlinek, within Myślibórz County, West Pomeranian Voivodeship, in north-western Poland. It lies approximately 12 km (7 mi) north-west of Barlinek, 18 km (11 mi) north-east of Myślibórz, and 52 km (32 mi) south-east of the regional capital Szczecin.
