= Uklejka =

- Settlement
- Location within Poland
- Coordinates: 52°59′13″N 15°15′5″E
- Country: Poland
- Voivodeship: West Pomeranian
- County: Myślibórz
- Gmina: Barlinek

Uklejka [uˈklɛi̯ka] is a settlement in the administrative district of Gmina Barlinek, within Myślibórz County, West Pomeranian Voivodeship, in north-western Poland. It lies approximately 4 km (2 mi) south-east of Barlinek, 27 km (17 mi) east of Myślibórz, and 66 km (41 mi) south-east of the regional capital Szczecin.

For the history of the region, see History of Pomerania.
