= Rychnówek =

- Settlement
- Location within Poland
- Coordinates: 52°57′12″N 15°8′23″E
- Country: Poland
- Voivodeship: West Pomeranian
- County: Myślibórz
- Gmina: Barlinek
- Population: 40

Rychnówek [rɨxˈnuvɛk] is a settlement in the administrative district of Gmina Barlinek, within Myślibórz County, West Pomeranian Voivodeship, in north-western Poland. It lies approximately 7 km (4 mi) south-west of Barlinek, 19 km (12 mi) east of Myślibórz, and 64 km (40 mi) south-east of the regional capital Szczecin.

For the history of the region, see History of Pomerania.

The settlement has a population of 40.
