= Lutówko, West Pomeranian Voivodeship =

Lutówko
- Village
- Location within Poland
- Coordinates: 53°1′50″N 15°10′19″E
- Country: Poland
- Voivodeship: West Pomeranian
- County: Myślibórz
- Gmina: Barlinek
- Population: 290

Lutówko [luˈtufkɔ] is a village in the administrative district of Gmina Barlinek, within Myślibórz County, West Pomeranian Voivodeship, in north-western Poland. It lies approximately 4 km (2 mi) north-west of Barlinek, 24 km (15 mi) north-east of Myślibórz, and 59 km (37 mi) south-east of the regional capital Szczecin.

For the history of the region, see History of Pomerania.

The village has a population of 290.
