= Więcław, Gmina Barlinek =

Więcław
- Settlement
- Location within Poland
- Coordinates: 52°55′32″N 15°9′28″E
- Country: Poland
- Voivodeship: West Pomeranian
- County: Myślibórz
- Gmina: Barlinek

Więcław [ˈvʲɛnt͡swaf] is a settlement in the administrative district of Gmina Barlinek, within Myślibórz County, West Pomeranian Voivodeship, in north-western Poland. It lies approximately 9 km (6 mi) south of Barlinek, 20 km (12 mi) east of Myślibórz, and 67 km (42 mi) south-east of the regional capital Szczecin.
