= Okunie =

- Village
- Location within Poland
- Coordinates: 52°56′19″N 15°13′9″E
- Country: Poland
- Voivodeship: West Pomeranian
- County: Myślibórz
- Gmina: Barlinek

Okunie [ɔˈkuɲɛ] (formerly German Wuckensee) is a village in the administrative district of Gmina Barlinek, within Myślibórz County, West Pomeranian Voivodeship, in north-western Poland. It lies approximately 7 km (4 mi) south of Barlinek, 24 km (15 mi) east of Myślibórz, and 68 km (42 mi) south-east of the regional capital Szczecin.

For the history of the region, see History of Pomerania.
