= Krzynka =

- Village
- Location within Poland
- Coordinates: 52°58′28″N 15°14′32″E
- Country: Poland
- Voivodeship: West Pomeranian
- County: Myślibórz
- Gmina: Barlinek
- Population (approx.): 410

Krzynka [ˈkʂɨŋka] (German: Krieningswerder) is a village in the administrative district of Gmina Barlinek, within Myślibórz County, West Pomeranian Voivodeship, in north-western Poland. It lies approximately 5 km (3 mi) south-east of Barlinek, 26 km (16 mi) east of Myślibórz, and 66 km (41 mi) south-east of the regional capital Szczecin.

For the history of the region, see History of Pomerania.

The village has an approximate population of 410.
