= Słonki, West Pomeranian Voivodeship =

Słonki
- Settlement
- Location within Poland
- Coordinates: 52°56′25″N 15°7′20″E
- Country: Poland
- Voivodeship: West Pomeranian
- County: Myślibórz
- Gmina: Barlinek
- Population: 40

Słonki [ˈswɔŋkʲi] is a settlement in the administrative district of Gmina Barlinek, within Myślibórz County, West Pomeranian Voivodeship, in north-western Poland. It lies approximately 9 km (6 mi) south-west of Barlinek, 18 km (11 mi) east of Myślibórz, and 64 km (40 mi) south-east of the regional capital Szczecin.

For the history of the region, see History of Pomerania.

The settlement has a population of 40.
