= Prądno =

- Settlement
- Location within Poland
- Coordinates: 52°58′17″N 15°15′25″E
- Country: Poland
- Voivodeship: West Pomeranian
- County: Myślibórz
- Gmina: Barlinek

Prądno [ˈprɔndnɔ] is a settlement in the administrative district of Gmina Barlinek, Myślibórz County, West Pomeranian Voivodeship, in north-western Poland. It lies approximately 5 km (3 mi) south-east of Barlinek, 27 km (17 mi) east of Myślibórz, and 67 km (42 mi) southeast of the regional capital Szczecin.

For the history of the region, see History of Pomerania.
