= Jaromierki =

- Settlement
- Location within Poland
- Coordinates: 53°0′54″N 15°11′0″E
- Country: Poland
- Voivodeship: West Pomeranian
- County: Myślibórz
- Gmina: Barlinek

Jaromierki [jarɔˈmʲɛrkʲi] is a settlement in the administrative district of Gmina Barlinek, within Myślibórz County, West Pomeranian Voivodeship, in north-western Poland. It lies approximately 3 km (2 mi) north-west of Barlinek, 24 km (15 mi) north-east of Myślibórz, and 60 km (37 mi) south-east of the regional capital Szczecin.

== See also ==
- History of Pomerania.
