= Żydowo, Myślibórz County =

Żydowo
- Village
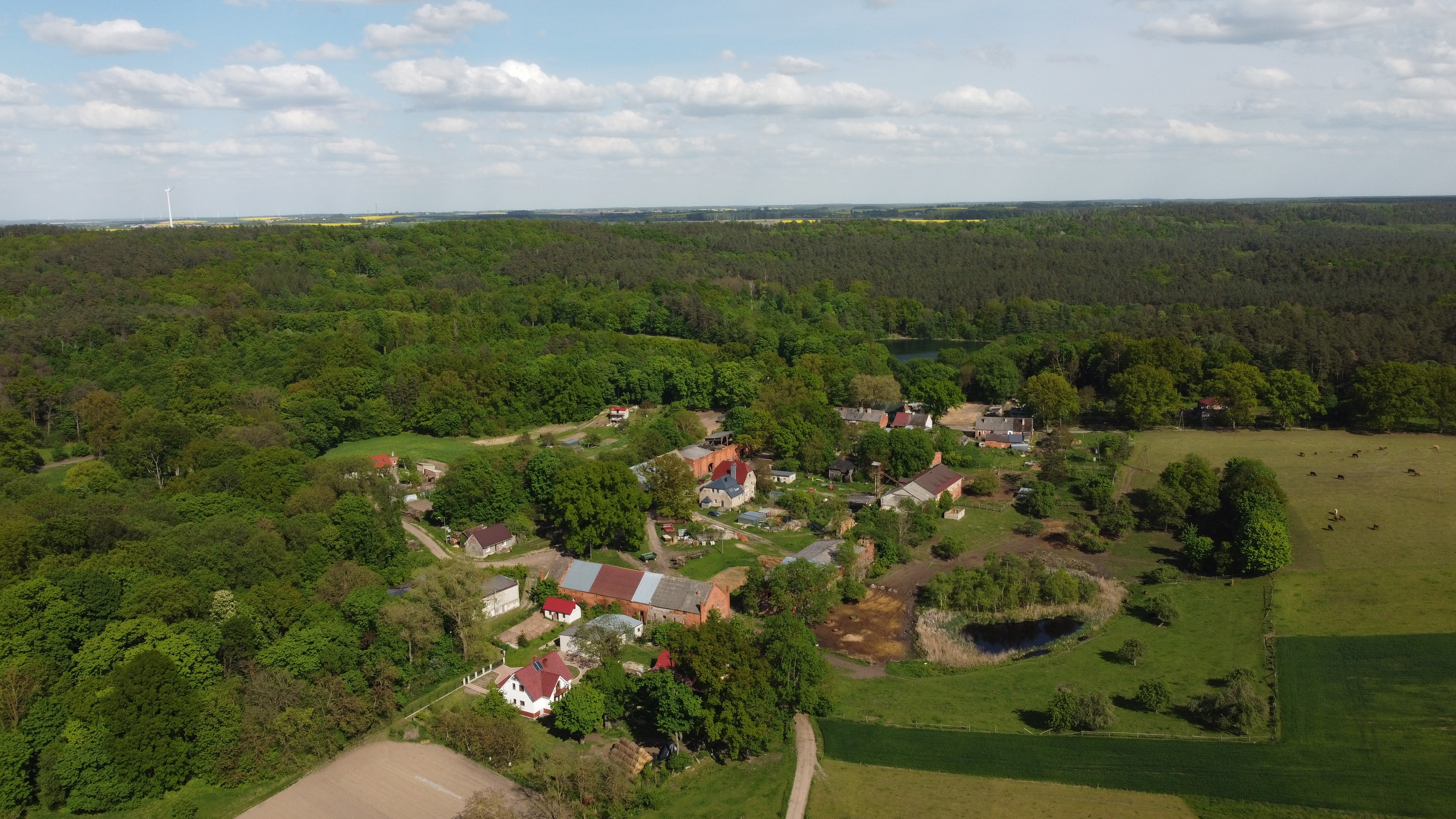

- Location within Poland
- Coordinates: 53°1′42″N 15°13′25″E
- Country: Poland
- Voivodeship: West Pomeranian
- County: Myślibórz
- Gmina: Barlinek
- Time zone: UTC+1 (CET)
  - Summer (DST): UTC+2 (CEST)
- Vehicle registration: ZMY

Żydowo [ʐɨˈdɔvɔ] is a village in the administrative district of Gmina Barlinek, within Myślibórz County, West Pomeranian Voivodeship, in north-western Poland. It lies approximately 4 km (2 mi) north-east of Barlinek, 27 km (17 mi) north-east of Myślibórz, and 61 km (38 mi) south-east of the regional capital Szczecin.
