= Kryń =

- Settlement
- Location within Poland
- Coordinates: 52°56′37″N 15°8′57″E
- Country: Poland
- Voivodeship: West Pomeranian
- County: Myślibórz
- Gmina: Barlinek

Kryń [krɨɲ] is a settlement in the administrative district of Gmina Barlinek, within Myślibórz County, West Pomeranian Voivodeship, in northwestern Poland. It lies approximately 8 km (5 mi) southwest of Barlinek, 19 km (12 mi) east of Myślibórz, and 65 km (40 mi) southeast of the regional capital Szczecin.
