= Krzepinek =

- Settlement
- Location within Poland
- Coordinates: 53°0′43″N 15°10′14″E
- Country: Poland
- Voivodeship: West Pomeranian
- County: Myślibórz
- Gmina: Barlinek

Krzepinek [kʂɛˈpʲinɛk] is a settlement in the administrative district of Gmina Barlinek, within Myślibórz County, West Pomeranian Voivodeship, in north-western Poland. It lies approximately 3 km (2 mi) north-west of Barlinek, 23 km (14 mi) north-east of Myślibórz, and 60 km (37 mi) south-east of the regional capital Szczecin.

For the history of the region, see History of Pomerania.
