= Sitno, Gmina Barlinek =

Sitno
- Settlement
- Location within Poland
- Coordinates: 52°54′19″N 15°16′0″E
- Country: Poland
- Voivodeship: West Pomeranian
- County: Myślibórz
- Gmina: Barlinek
- Population: 40

Sitno [ˈɕitnɔ] is a settlement in the administrative district of Gmina Barlinek, within Myślibórz County, West Pomeranian Voivodeship, in north-western Poland. It lies approximately 12 km (7 mi) south-east of Barlinek, 28 km (17 mi) east of Myślibórz, and 73 km (45 mi) south-east of the regional capital Szczecin.

For the history of the region, see History of Pomerania.

The settlement has a population of 40.
