= Brunki =

- Village
- Location within Poland
- Coordinates: 52°57′38″N 15°10′15″E
- Country: Poland
- Voivodeship: West Pomeranian
- County: Myślibórz
- Gmina: Barlinek
- Population: 70

Brunki [ˈbruŋkʲi] is a village in the administrative district of Gmina Barlinek, within Myślibórz County, West Pomeranian Voivodeship, in north-western Poland. It lies approximately 5 km (3 mi) south-west of Barlinek, 21 km (13 mi) east of Myślibórz, and 65 km (40 mi) south-east of the regional capital Szczecin.

The village has a population of 70.

== See also ==
- History of Pomerania
