= Mostkowo, West Pomeranian Voivodeship =

Mostkowo
- Village
- Location within Poland
- Coordinates: 52°59′N 15°3′E
- Country: Poland
- Voivodeship: West Pomeranian
- County: Myślibórz
- Gmina: Barlinek

Mostkowo [mɔstˈkɔvɔ] is a village in the administrative district of Gmina Barlinek, within Myślibórz County, West Pomeranian Voivodeship, in north-western Poland. It lies approximately 11 km (7 mi) west of Barlinek, 14 km (9 mi) north-east of Myślibórz, and 58 km (36 mi) south-east of the regional capital Szczecin.

For the history of the region, see History of Pomerania.
