= Moczkowo =

- Village
- Location within Poland
- Coordinates: 52°58′N 15°11′E
- Country: Poland
- Voivodeship: West Pomeranian
- County: Myślibórz
- Gmina: Barlinek

Moczkowo [mɔt͡ʂˈkɔvɔ] is a village in the administrative district of Gmina Barlinek, within Myślibórz County, West Pomeranian Voivodeship, in northwestern Poland. It is approximately 4 km (2 mi) south of Barlinek, 22 km (14 mi) east of Myślibórz, and 64 km (40 mi) southeast of the regional capital Szczecin.

For its history, see History of Pomerania.
