= Ożar =

- Village
- Location within Poland
- Coordinates: 53°0′N 15°9′E
- Country: Poland
- Voivodeship: West Pomeranian
- County: Myślibórz
- Gmina: Barlinek

Ożar [ˈɔʐar] is a village in the administrative district of Gmina Barlinek, within Myślibórz County, West Pomeranian Voivodeship, in north-western Poland. It lies approximately 4 km (2 mi) west of Barlinek, 21 km (13 mi) east of Myślibórz, and 60 km (37 mi) south-east of the regional capital Szczecin.

The villages population is 90 as of the 2011 census.

For the history of the region, see History of Pomerania.
