= Lubie, West Pomeranian Voivodeship =

Lubie
- Settlement
- Location within Poland
- Coordinates: 52°58′43″N 15°8′18″E
- Country: Poland
- Voivodeship: West Pomeranian
- County: Myślibórz
- Gmina: Barlinek

Lubie [ˈlubʲɛ] is a settlement in the administrative district of Gmina Barlinek, within Myślibórz County, West Pomeranian Voivodeship, in north-western Poland. It lies approximately 5 km (3 mi) south-west of Barlinek, 19 km (12 mi) east of Myślibórz, and 62 km (39 mi) south-east of the regional capital Szczecin.

For the history of the region, see History of Pomerania.
