= Wiewiórki, West Pomeranian Voivodeship =

Wiewiórki
- Village
- Location within Poland
- Coordinates: 52°59′32″N 15°5′37″E
- Country: Poland
- Voivodeship: West Pomeranian
- County: Myślibórz
- Gmina: Barlinek

Wiewiórki [vʲɛˈvʲurkʲi] is a village in the administrative district of Gmina Barlinek, within Myślibórz County, West Pomeranian Voivodeship, in north-western Poland. It lies approximately 8 km (5 mi) west of Barlinek, 17 km (11 mi) north-east of Myślibórz, and 59 km (37 mi) south-east of the regional capital Szczecin.
