= Równo, West Pomeranian Voivodeship =

Równo
- Village
- Location within Poland
- Coordinates: 53°3′35″N 15°10′15″E
- Country: Poland
- Voivodeship: West Pomeranian
- County: Myślibórz
- Gmina: Barlinek
- Population: 100

Równo [ˈruvnɔ] is a village in the administrative district of Gmina Barlinek, within Myślibórz County, West Pomeranian Voivodeship, in north-western Poland. It lies approximately 7 km (4 mi) north of Barlinek, 25 km (16 mi) north-east of Myślibórz, and 56 km (35 mi) south-east of the regional capital Szczecin.

For the history of the region, see History of Pomerania.

The village has a population of 100.
