= Osina, Myślibórz County =

Osina
- Village
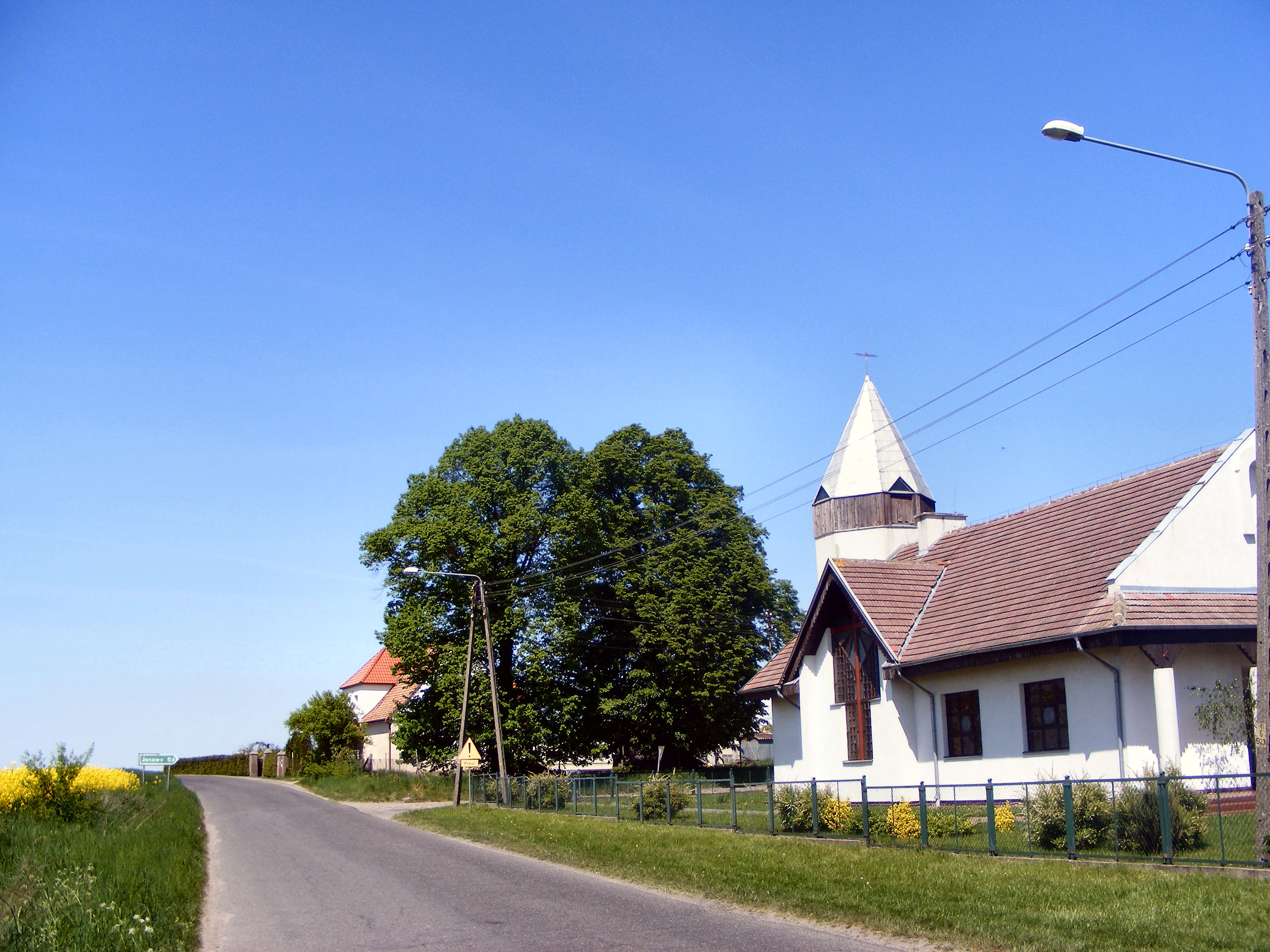
- Our Lady of Sorrows Church

- Location within Poland
- Coordinates: 53°1′N 15°11′E
- Country: Poland
- Voivodeship: West Pomeranian
- County: Myślibórz
- Gmina: Barlinek
- Population: 120

Osina [ɔˈɕina] is a village in the administrative district of Gmina Barlinek, within Myślibórz County, West Pomeranian Voivodeship, in north-western Poland. It lies approximately 3 km (2 mi) north-west of Barlinek, 24 km (15 mi) north-east of Myślibórz, and 60 km (37 mi) south-east of the regional capital Szczecin.

For the history of the region, see History of Pomerania.

The village has a population of 120.
