= Moczydło, West Pomeranian Voivodeship =

Moczydło
- Village
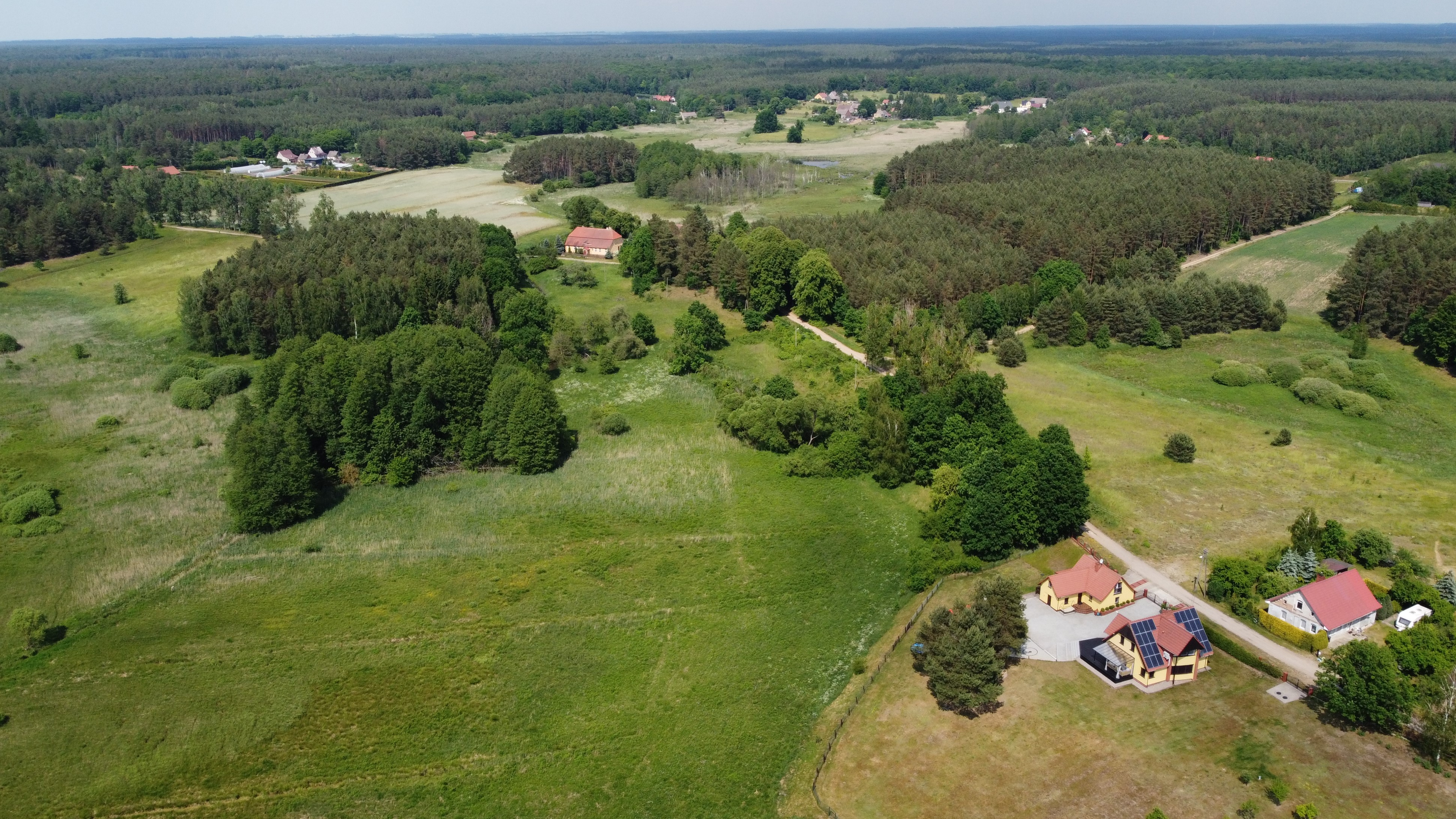

- Location within Poland
- Coordinates: 52°55′6″N 15°17′13″E
- Country: Poland
- Voivodeship: West Pomeranian
- County: Myślibórz
- Gmina: Barlinek
- Population: 140
- Time zone: UTC+1 (CET)
  - Summer (DST): UTC+2 (CEST)
- Vehicle registration: ZMY

Moczydło [mɔˈt͡ʂɨdwɔ] is a village in the administrative district of Gmina Barlinek, within Myślibórz County, West Pomeranian Voivodeship, in north-western Poland. It lies approximately 11 km (7 mi) south-east of Barlinek, 29 km (18 mi) east of Myślibórz, and 73 km (45 mi) south-east of the regional capital Szczecin.

The village has a population of 140.
