= Dziedzina =

Dziedina ([d͡ʑeˈd͡ʑina]) means a field of study, discipline or geographic domain in Polish and may refer to

- Julian Dziedzina (1930–2007), a Polish film critic and director
- Nowa Dziedzina, a village in the administrative district in Poland
- Stara Dziedzina, a village in Poland
