= Janowo, Myślibórz County =

Janowo
- Village
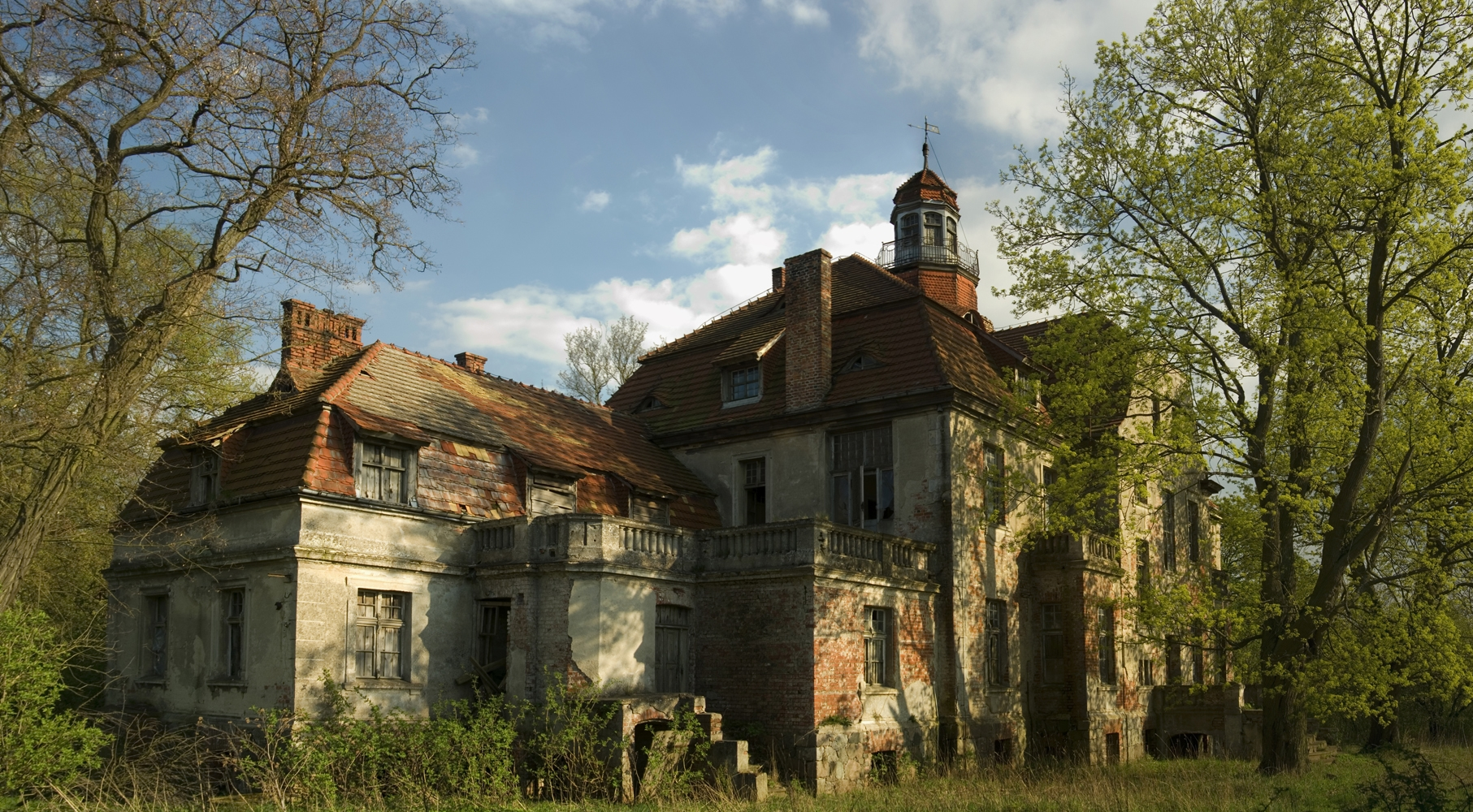
- Janowo Palace

- Location within Poland
- Coordinates: 53°1′57″N 15°11′28″E
- Country: Poland
- Voivodeship: West Pomeranian
- County: Myślibórz
- Gmina: Barlinek
- Time zone: UTC+1 (CET)
  - Summer (DST): UTC+2 (CEST)
- Vehicle registration: ZMY

Janowo [jaˈnɔvɔ] is a village in the administrative district of Gmina Barlinek, within Myślibórz County, West Pomeranian Voivodeship, in north-western Poland. It lies approximately 4 km (2 mi) north of Barlinek, 25 km (16 mi) north-east of Myślibórz, and 59 km (37 mi) south-east of the regional capital Szczecin.
