= Trzebin, Myślibórz County =

Trzebin
- Settlement
- Location within Poland
- Coordinates: 52°58′50″N 15°16′47″E
- Country: Poland
- Voivodeship: West Pomeranian
- County: Myślibórz
- Gmina: Barlinek

Trzebin [ˈtʂɛbʲin] is a settlement in the administrative district of Gmina Barlinek, within Myślibórz County, West Pomeranian Voivodeship, in north-western Poland. It lies approximately 6 km (4 mi) east of Barlinek, 29 km (18 mi) east of Myślibórz, and 68 km (42 mi) south-east of the regional capital Szczecin.

For the history of the region, see History of Pomerania.
