= Dziedzice, West Pomeranian Voivodeship =

Dziedzice
- Village
- Location within Poland
- Coordinates: 53°1′24″N 15°4′45″E
- Country: Poland
- Voivodeship: West Pomeranian
- County: Myślibórz
- Gmina: Barlinek
- Website: http://www.dziedzice.org

Dziedzice [d͡ʑɛˈd͡ʑit͡sɛ] is a village in the administrative district of Gmina Barlinek, within Myślibórz County, West Pomeranian Voivodeship, in north-western Poland. It lies approximately 9 km (6 mi) west of Barlinek, 18 km (11 mi) north-east of Myślibórz, and 55 km (34 mi) south-east of the regional capital Szczecin.

For the history of the region, see History of Pomerania.
