= Rychnów, West Pomeranian Voivodeship =

Rychnów
- Village
- Location within Poland
- Coordinates: 52°57′N 15°7′E
- Country: Poland
- Voivodeship: West Pomeranian
- County: Myślibórz
- Gmina: Barlinek

Rychnów [ˈrɨxnuf] is a village in the administrative district of Gmina Barlinek, within Myślibórz County, West Pomeranian Voivodeship, in north-western Poland. It lies approximately 8 km (5 mi) south-west of Barlinek, 17 km (11 mi) east of Myślibórz, and 63 km (39 mi) south-east of the regional capital Szczecin.

For the history of the region, see History of Pomerania.
