= Przymiarki, Gmina Barlinek =

Przymiarki
- Settlement
- Location within Poland
- Coordinates: 52°58′17″N 15°15′25″E
- Country: Poland
- Voivodeship: West Pomeranian
- County: Myślibórz
- Gmina: Barlinek

Przymiarki [pʂɨˈmʲarkʲi] is a settlement in the administrative district of Gmina Barlinek, within Myślibórz County, West Pomeranian Voivodeship, in north-western Poland. It lies approximately 5 km (3 mi) south-east of Barlinek, 27 km (17 mi) east of Myślibórz, and 67 km (42 mi) south-east of the regional capital Szczecin.

For the history of the region, see History of Pomerania.
