= Sucha, Myślibórz County =

Sucha
- Settlement
- Location within Poland
- Coordinates: 52°54′6″N 15°12′30″E
- Country: Poland
- Voivodeship: West Pomeranian
- County: Myślibórz
- Gmina: Barlinek
- Population: 40

Sucha [ˈsuxa] is a settlement in the administrative district of Gmina Barlinek, within Myślibórz County, West Pomeranian Voivodeship, in north-western Poland. It lies approximately 11 km (7 mi) south of Barlinek, 24 km (15 mi) east of Myślibórz, and 71 km (44 mi) south-east of the regional capital Szczecin.

For the history of the region, see History of Pomerania.

The settlement has a population of 40.
