= Łubianka, West Pomeranian Voivodeship =

Łubianka
- Village
- Location within Poland
- Coordinates: 52°53′N 15°12′E
- Country: Poland
- Voivodeship: West Pomeranian
- County: Myślibórz
- Gmina: Barlinek

Łubianka [wuˈbʲaŋka] is a village in the administrative district of Gmina Barlinek, within Myślibórz County, West Pomeranian Voivodeship, in north-western Poland. It lies approximately 13 km (8 mi) south of Barlinek, 24 km (15 mi) east of Myślibórz, and 73 km (45 mi) south-east of the regional capital Szczecin.

For the history of the region, see History of Pomerania.
