= Kornatka, West Pomeranian Voivodeship =

Kornatka
- Settlement
- Location within Poland
- Coordinates: 52°58′20″N 15°3′59″E
- Country: Poland
- Voivodeship: West Pomeranian
- County: Myślibórz
- Gmina: Barlinek

Kornatka [kɔrˈnatka] is a settlement in the administrative district of Gmina Barlinek, within Myślibórz County, West Pomeranian Voivodeship, in north-western Poland. It lies approximately 10 km (6 mi) west of Barlinek, 15 km (9 mi) east of Myślibórz, and 59 km (37 mi) south-east of the regional capital Szczecin.

For the history of the region, see History of Pomerania.
