= Gmina Barlinek =

Gmina Barlinek Barlinek Commune
- Gmina
- Coat of arms
- Interactive map of Gmina Barlinek
- Coordinates (Barlinek): 53°0′N 15°12′E
- Country: Poland
- Voivodeship: West Pomeranian
- County: Myślibórz
- Seat: Barlinek

Area
  - Total: 258.77 km^{2} (99.91 sq mi)

Population (2006)
  - Total: 19,528
  - Density: 75.465/km^{2} (195.45/sq mi)
  - Urban: 14,156
  - Rural: 5,372
- Website: http://www.barlinek.pl/

Gmina Barlinek is an urban-rural gmina (administrative district) in Myślibórz County, West Pomeranian Voivodeship, in north-western Poland. Its seat is the town of Barlinek, which lies approximately 24 kilometres (15 mi) east of Myślibórz and 62 km (39 mi) south-east of the regional capital Szczecin.

The gmina covers an area of 258.77 square kilometres (99.9 sq mi), and as of 2006 its total population is 19,528, of which the population of Barlinek is 14,156, and the population of the rural part of the gmina is 5,372.

The gmina contains part of the protected area called Barlinek-Gorzów Landscape Park.

== Villages ==
Apart from the town of Barlinek, Gmina Barlinek contains the villages and settlements of Brunki, Dziedzice, Dzikówko, Dzikowo, Golejewo, Janowo, Jaromierki, Jarząbki, Kornatka, Kryń, Krzepinek, Krzynka, Laskówko, Łubianka, Lubie, Luśno, Lutówko, Lutowo, Moczkowo, Moczydło, Mostkowo, Niepołcko, Nierybno, Niewstąp, Nowa Dziedzina, Ogard, Okno, Okunie, Osina, Ożar, Parsko, Piaśnik, Płonno, Podębie, Podgórze, Prądno, Przymiarki, Pustać, Rówienko, Równo, Rychnów, Rychnówek, Sitno, Słonki, Stara Dziedzina, Strąpie, Sucha, Swadzim, Trzebin, Uklejka, Więcław, Wierzchno, Wiewiórki, Żelice and Żydowo.

== Neighbouring gminas ==
Gmina Barlinek is bordered by the gminas of Dolice, Kłodawa, Lipiany, Myślibórz, Nowogródek Pomorski, Pełczyce, Przelewice and Strzelce Krajeńskie.
