= Nowa Dziedzina =

- Village
- Location within Poland
- Coordinates: 53°1′51″N 15°6′53″E
- Country: Poland
- Voivodeship: West Pomeranian
- County: Myślibórz
- Gmina: Barlinek

Nowa Dziedzina [ˈnɔva d͡ʑɛˈd͡ʑina] is a village in the administrative district of Gmina Barlinek, within Myślibórz County, West Pomeranian Voivodeship, in north-western Poland. It lies approximately 7 km (4 mi) north-west of Barlinek, 20 km (12 mi) north-east of Myślibórz, and 56 km (35 mi) south-east of the regional capital Szczecin.

For the history of the region, see History of Pomerania.
