= Piaśnik =

Piaśnik may refer to the following places:

- Piaśnik, Myślibórz County in West Pomeranian Voivodeship (north-west Poland)
- Piaśnik, Pyrzyce County in West Pomeranian Voivodeship (north-west Poland)
- Piaśnik, Stargard County in West Pomeranian Voivodeship (north-west Poland)
