= Okno, West Pomeranian Voivodeship =

Okno
- Settlement
- Location within Poland
- Coordinates: 52°56′37″N 15°15′9″E
- Country: Poland
- Voivodeship: West Pomeranian
- County: Myślibórz
- Gmina: Barlinek

Okno [ˈɔknɔ] is a settlement in the administrative district of Gmina Barlinek, within Myślibórz County, West Pomeranian Voivodeship, in north-western Poland. It lies approximately 8 km (5 mi) south-east of Barlinek, 26 km (16 mi) east of Myślibórz, and 69 km (43 mi) south-east of the regional capital Szczecin.

For the history of the region, see History of Pomerania.
