= Swadzim =

Swadzim may refer to the following places:

- Swadzim, Greater Poland Voivodeship (west-central Poland)
- Swadzim, West Pomeranian Voivodeship (north-west Poland)
