= Okno (disambiguation) =

Okno (Rus. "window") is a Russian space surveillance station located in Tajikistan

Okno may also refer to:

- Okno-S, space surveillance station in Russia
- Okno (Russian magazine)
- Okno, West Pomeranian Voivodeship, village in Poland
- Oknö, island in Sweden
- Okno, Manitoba, community in the Municipality of Bifrost-Riverton, Manitoba, Canada

== See also ==
- Okna (disambiguation)
