= Swadzim, West Pomeranian Voivodeship =

Swadzim
- Village
- Location within Poland
- Coordinates: 53°0′3″N 15°5′46″E
- Country: Poland
- Voivodeship: West Pomeranian
- County: Myślibórz
- Gmina: Barlinek

Swadzim [ˈsfad͡ʑim] is a village in the administrative district of Gmina Barlinek, within Myślibórz County, West Pomeranian Voivodeship, in north-western Poland. It lies approximately 7 km (4 mi) west of Barlinek, 18 km (11 mi) north-east of Myślibórz, and 58 km (36 mi) south-east of the regional capital Szczecin.

For the history of the region, see History of Pomerania.
