= Lessmann =

Lessmann is a surname. Notable people with the surname include:

- Claus Lessmann
- Lara Marie Lessmann
- Daniel Lessmann
- Max Lessmann and Leo Lessmann, the founders of Israelitisches Familienblatt (1898-1939), a Jewish newspaper in Hamburg, Germany

== See also ==
- Lesman
