= Karl Wilhelm Posselt =

German missionary

Karl/Carl Wilhelm Posselt (20 June 1815 Diekow, Berlinchen, Neumark, Prussia – 12 May 1885 Christianenburg, Natal, South Africa), was a German missionary from the Berlin Missionary Society and was active in South Africa where he became known as "the missionary with the violin".

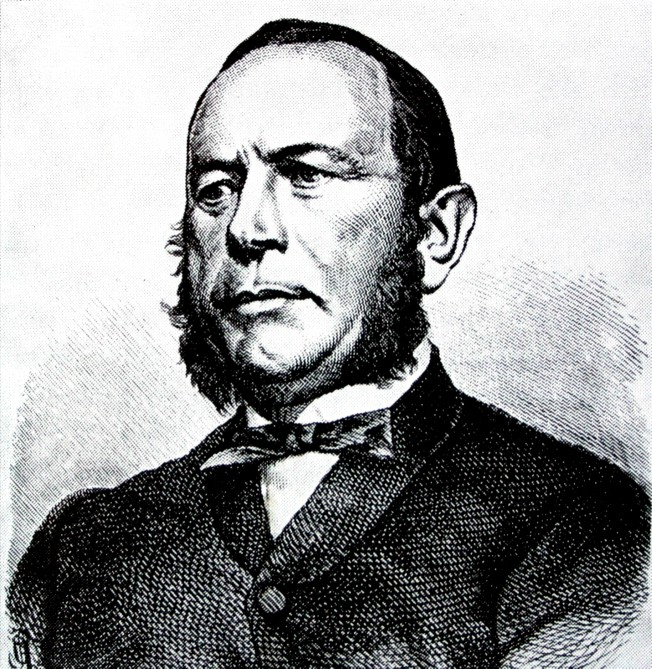
Karl Wilhelm Posselt

Posselt initially trained as a teacher at Neuzelle, but became inspired by mission work during his training and attended a seminary in Berlin from 1834-39. On 21 December 1839 he disembarked at Table Bay after a voyage from Hamburg on the Devonshire. He arrived as a member of the Berlin Missionary Society and in the company of fellow missionaries Ludwig Liefeldt and Johannes Winter.

Posselt served his apprenticeship under Carl Friedrich Schultheiss (1815-1855) at the Itemba mission station on the Kubusie River near Stutterheim in Kaffraria. Here he also learnt the rudiments of the Xhosa language. Itemba was razed during the Frontier War of 1846-47, rebuilt and redestroyed in 1850. Posselt and Liefeldt started a new mission station Emmaus, which was renamed Wartburg, on the Indwe River, only to have that sacked as well. Posselt then started work among the Zulu people living below the Drakensberg in Natal and near the modern-day Bergville. With Wilhelm Guldenpfennig he founded a new station there, again named Emmaus, and existing to this day. In 1856 when hostilities again broke out, Posselt fled to Pietermaritzburg. There he served the community of Neu-Deutschland which had been founded in 1848 with the arrival of 182 German settlers from Bremen, and whose main activity was growing cotton. Then it was located just outside Port Natal, but today forms part of Westville in Durban. The settlers had been recruited from Bramsche near Osnabrück by a director of the "Natal Cotton Company", Jonas Bergtheil in order to cultivate cotton. The cotton-growing project soon failed and the colonists started growing vegetables to supply the demand in Port Natal. Some of the Germans moved inland and started the settlement of Neu-Hanover or New Hanover near Pietermaritzburg.

Posselt returned to Emmaus when the community of Neu-Deutschland seemed to be on the point of dissolving, but went back when the rifts were healed. In 1858 he settled at the mission station he had founded in 1854 and named Christianenburg after his first wife, situated close to Neu-Deutschland and forming part of present-day Clermont Township.

== Family ==
Posselt's parents were Carl Ludwig Posselt (9 April 1782 - 27 December 1834), a schoolteacher in Diekow, and Marie Elisabeth Fischer (24 June 1781 - 27 December 1834). They had 4 children: Charlotte, Karl Ludwig, Karl Wilhelm, Karl August.
Karl Wilhelm married his first wife, Christiane Schönheit (d17 April 1848 Pietermaritzburg), on 1 April 1841 in Uitenhage and had 3 children - Johannes, Nathaniel, Christiane

He married his second wife, Sophie Elizabeth Königkrämer (10 December 1834 - 30 November 1913), on 11 June 1851, producing 11 more children: Nathaniel, Mathilde, Emilie Christiana, Felix Albrecht Wilhelm, Sophie Lisette, Hermann Eberhardt, Erna, Emma Anna, Theodor Wilhelm, and Otto Helmuth and Therese.

- Sophie Lisette Posselt (5 October 1860 Christianenburg - 14 January 1923 Botshabelo, Middelburg) married the missionary Friedrich Michael Hellmuth Beuster (31 December 1850 Liebenwalde, Brandenburg - 1 April 1920 Botshabelo, Middelburg) on 31 October 1879 at Christianenburg.
- Mathilde Posselt (1855 Emmaus, Bergville - 8 January 1932 Pretoria) married missionary Friedrich Carl Adolph Grünberger (15 April 1838 Godow, Oberschlesien - 1 August 1918 Pretoria)

== See also ==
- Germans in Natal

== Bibliography ==
- Pfitzner, E., & D. Wangemann, "Wilhelm Posselt der Kaffernmissionar", Berlin 1895
