= Laskówko =

- Village
- Location within Poland
- Coordinates: 53°04′23″N 15°12′17″E
- Country: Poland
- Voivodeship: West Pomeranian
- County: Myślibórz
- Gmina: Barlinek

Laskówko [lasˈkufkɔ] is a village in the administrative district of Gmina Barlinek, within Myślibórz County, West Pomeranian Voivodeship, in north-western Poland.

For the history of the region, see History of Pomerania.
