= Pustać =

- Settlement
- Location within Poland
- Coordinates: 52°58′48″N 15°06′02″E
- Country: Poland
- Voivodeship: West Pomeranian
- County: Myślibórz
- Gmina: Barlinek

Pustać [ˈpustat͡ɕ] is a settlement in the administrative district of Gmina Barlinek, within Myślibórz County, West Pomeranian Voivodeship, in north-western Poland.

== See also ==
- History of Pomerania
