= Niepołcko =

- Village
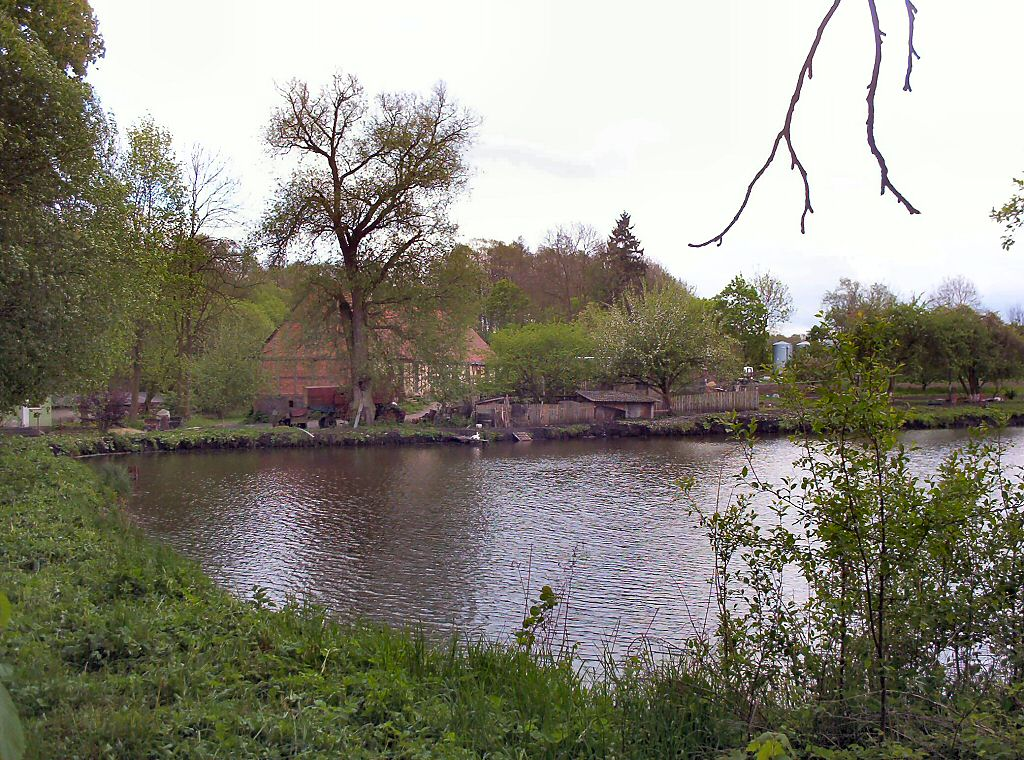
- Niepołcko, countryside landscape

- Location within Poland
- Coordinates: 53°01′52″N 15°09′39″E
- Country: Poland
- Voivodeship: West Pomeranian
- County: Myślibórz
- Gmina: Barlinek

Niepołcko [ɲɛˈpɔu̯t͡skɔ] (German: Niepölzig) is a village in the administrative district of Gmina Barlinek, within Myślibórz County, West Pomeranian Voivodeship, in north-western Poland.

For the history of the region, see History of Pomerania.
