= Golejewo, Myślibórz County =

Golejewo
- Settlement
- Country: Poland
- Voivodeship: West Pomeranian
- County: Myślibórz
- Gmina: Barlinek

Golejewo [ɡɔlɛˈjɛvɔ] is a settlement in the administrative district of Gmina Barlinek, within Myślibórz County, West Pomeranian Voivodeship, in north-western Poland.

== See also ==
History of Pomerania
