= Okna =

Okna may refer to:

== Places ==
- Okna (Česká Lípa District), a municipality and village in the Czech Republic
- Okna, Kuyavian-Pomeranian Voivodeship, a village in Poland
- Okna, the former German name for the village of Vikno, Chernivtsi Oblast, Ukraine

== Other ==
- Okna (TV series), Russian television tabloid talk show
- Okna Tsahan Zam, Kalmyk singer

== See also ==
- Okno (disambiguation)
