= Lesman =

Lesman can be both a masculine given name and a surname. Notable people with the surname include:

- Lesman Paredes (born 1996), Colombian-born Bahraini weightlifter
- Bolesław Lesman, birth name of Bolesław Leśmian (1877–1937), Polish Jewish poet and artist
- Jan Wiktor Lesman, birth name of Jan Brzechwa (1898–1966), Polish Jewish poet, author, and lawyer
- Germán Lesman, Argentinian footballer

== See also ==
- Lessmann
