= Dzikówko =

- Village
- Location within Poland
- Coordinates: 53°59′14″N 15°09′22″E
- Country: Poland
- Voivodeship: West Pomeranian
- County: Myślibórz
- Gmina: Barlinek

Dzikówko [d͡ʑiˈkufkɔ] (German: Neu Dieckow) is a village in the administrative district of Gmina Barlinek, within Myślibórz County, West Pomeranian Voivodeship, in north-western Poland.
