= Stara Dziedzina =

- Village
- Location within Poland
- Coordinates: 53°01′47″N 15°03′24″E
- Country: Poland
- Voivodeship: West Pomeranian
- County: Myślibórz
- Gmina: Barlinek
- Population: 145

Stara Dziedzina [ˈstara d͡ʑɛˈd͡ʑina] is a village in the administrative district of Gmina Barlinek, within Myślibórz County, West Pomeranian Voivodeship, in north-western, Poland.

For the history of the region, see History of Pomerania.

The village has a population of 145.
