= Daniel Lessmann =

German historian and poet

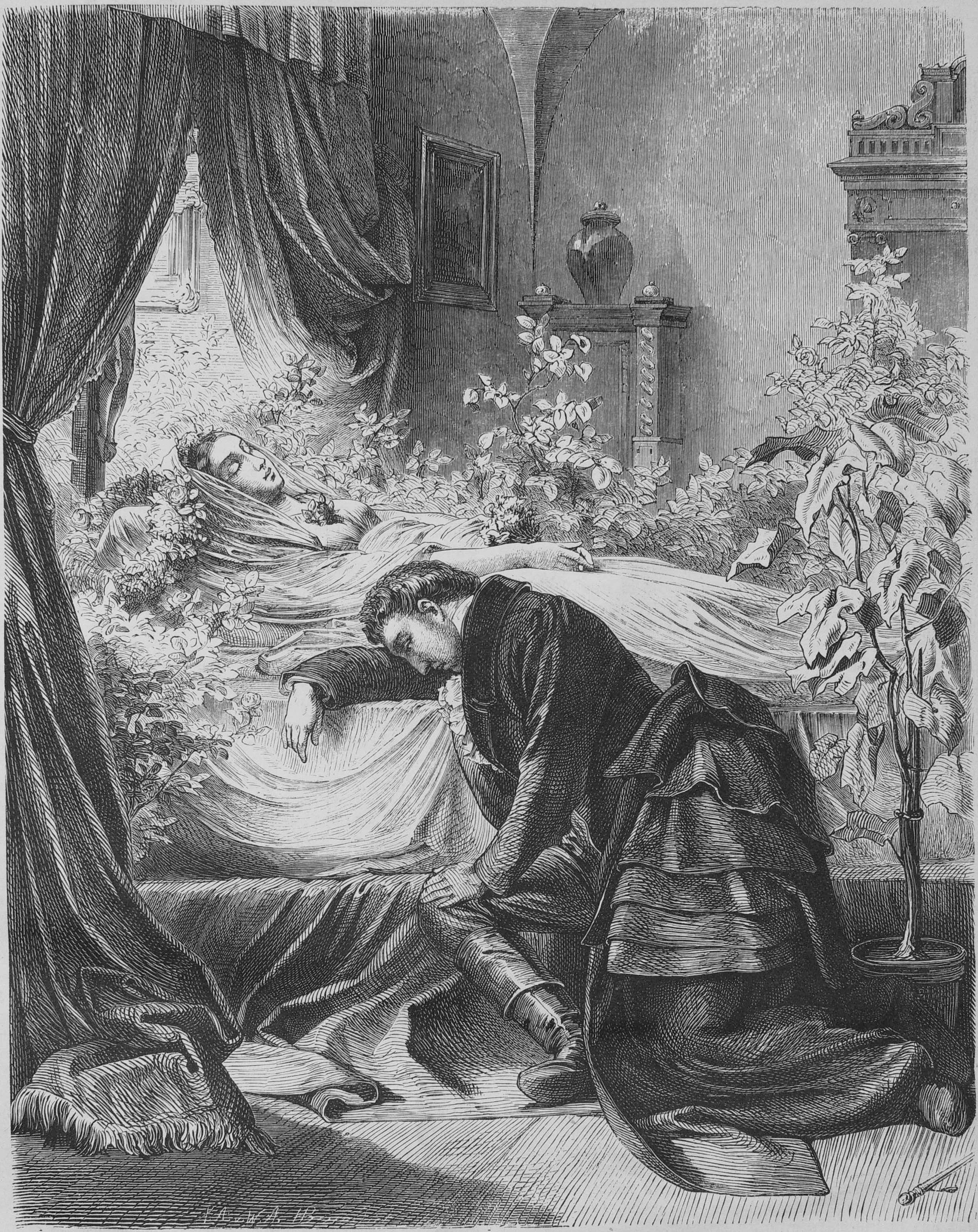
Daniel Lessmann on the coffin of his bride, from Die Gartenlaube, issue 3, 1866.

Daniel Lessmann (January 18, 1794 in Soldin, Neumark – Sept. 2, 1831 between Kropstadt and Wittenberg) was a German historian and poet.

Born to Jewish parents, he attended Joachimsthalsches Gymnasium and went on to study medicine in Berlin. His studies were put on hold in 1813 when he joined the Volunteers Against Napoleon. He was wounded at the Battle of Lutzen (May 2, 1813), recovered, and remained in service until the end of the war.

After the war, he continued his medical studies and became a private tutor in Vienna in 1820, then in Verona in 1823. In 1824, he settled in Berlin to devote himself to freelance writing and contributed to the more important literary journals of the Restoration period. He also converted to Christianity during the same period. His work consisted of historical essays, short stories, poetry, and scenes of life in the southern countries he had visited. A collection of poems was published in Berlin in 1824 under the title, "Amathusia".

His literary work was influenced by Heinrich Heine, whom he became acquainted with and whose letters to Moses Moser frequently mention the aspiring writer. Lessmann took part in various literary circles and was a witty storyteller. His prose work includes "Louise von Halling," 1827, which was read by Goethe, and "Die Heidemuhle," published several years after his death. His translations of "The Nun of Monza" by Gioachino Rossini and "The Betrothed" by Alessandro Manzoni were major contributions to the introduction of modern Italian literature to Germany. He also wrote several volumes of history, some of which are only found in manuscript form.

In the seven years of his publishing career (1824–1830) Lessmann became deeply depressed as his aspirations of becoming a great literary figure were dulled by a disappointed public. In 1824, Lessmann converted to Christianity. According to a letter from Moser to Heine, Lessmann converted so that he might realize his hopes of literary success. The conversion did nothing to boost his literary career and his situation seemed hopeless. In 1831, on a walk from Berlin to Leipzig and Dresden with a new manuscript, trying to find a publisher, Lessmann hanged himself.

== Selected works ==
- Amathusia, 1824
- Translation of Manzoni's The Betrothed
- Translation of Rossini's The Nun of Monza
- Louise von Halling, 1827
- Cisalpine Leaves, 1828
- Stories, 1828–30
- The Hiking Book of a Melancholy, 1831/32
- The Forest Mill, 1833

== Bibliography ==
- Gödeke, Grundr. der Deutschen Literatur, iii. 730-732
- Gubitz, Errinnerungen, iii. 1–7, Berlin, 1869
- L. Geiger, Daniel Lessmann, in Allg. Deutsche Biog. xviii. 451-453
- Strodtmann, Heine, i. 319
- Brümmer, Dichterlexikon
