= Barlinek =

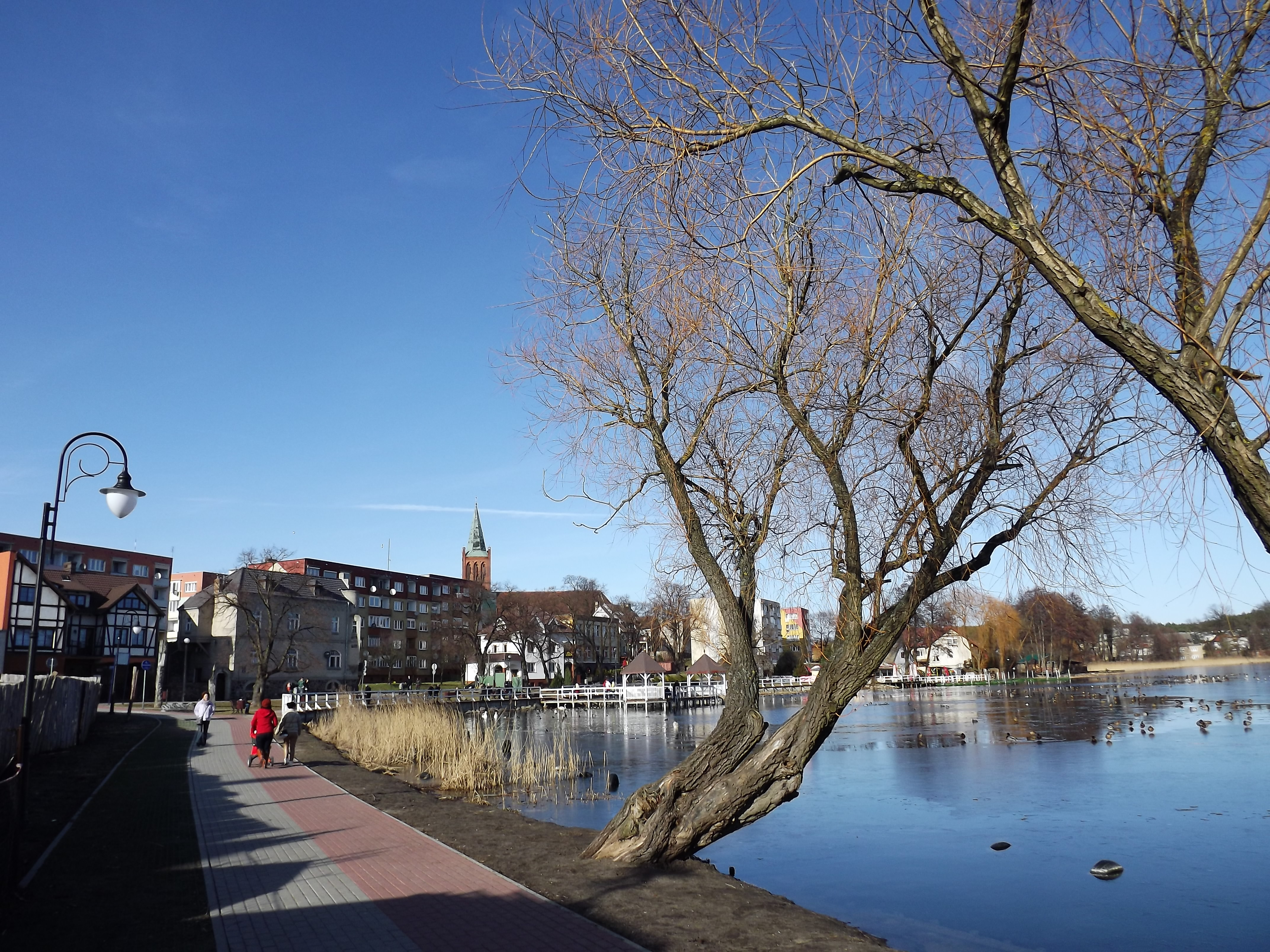
- Barlinek Lake in Barlinek

- Coat of arms

- Location within Poland
- Coordinates: 53°0′N 15°12′E
- Country: Poland
- Voivodeship: West Pomeranian
- County: Myślibórz
- Gmina: Barlinek
- Town rights: 1278

Government
  - Mayor: Bernarda Lewandowska

Area
  - Total: 17.55 km^{2} (6.78 sq mi)

Population (31 December 2021)
  - Total: 13,491
  - Density: 769/km^{2} (1,990/sq mi)
- Time zone: UTC+1 (CET)
  - Summer (DST): UTC+2 (CEST)
- Postal code: 74-320
- Area code: +48 95
- Car plates: ZMY
- Website: https://www.barlinek.pl

Barlinek [barˈlʲinɛk] (German: Berlinchen) is a town in Myślibórz County, in West Pomeranian Voivodeship, in northwestern Poland. It is the administrative seat of Gmina Barlinek. As of December 2021, the town has a population of 13,491. It is situated on the shores of Barlinek Lake.

== Geography ==
Barlinek is located in the northwestern part of the historical Greater Poland, later forming part of the historical New March region on the Płonia River, about 30 km (19 mi) north of Gorzów Wielkopolski.

== History ==
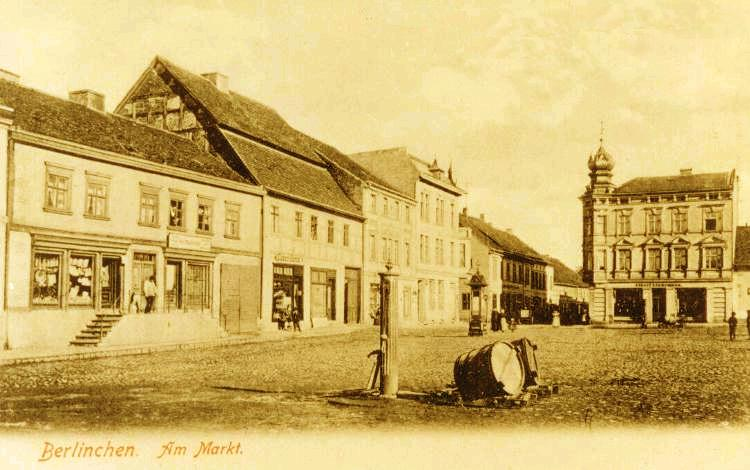
Market place, about 1900

A gord settlement existed in present-day Barlinek in the Middle Ages. The area formed part of Poland after the creation of the Polish state in the 10th century. It was part of the province of Greater Poland, before being annexed by the Margraviate of Brandenburg in the late 13th century. The settlement of Nova Berlyn was first mentioned in a 1278 deed, when it was founded by the Ascanian margraves of Brandenburg. It was meant as a stronghold in the newly acquired Neumark region, bordering on the Pomeranian estates around nearby Pełczyce, which the margraves nevertheless conquered soon afterwards.

In the 14th century, the town gained its first fortified walls (still partly visible). In 1373 the town became part of the Lands of the Bohemian (Czech) Crown, ruled by the Luxembourg dynasty. In 1402, the Luxembourgs reached an agreement with Poland in Kraków. Poland was to buy and re-incorporate the region, but eventually the Luxembourgs sold it to the Teutonic Order. In 1454 the Teutonic Knights sold the town to the Margraviate of Brandenburg in order to raise funds for war with Poland. From 1701 it belonged to the Kingdom of Prussia and between 1871 and 1945 it was part of Germany, within which it was called Berlinchen. From the 18th century onwards the town prospered as a centre of brewing and cloth manufacturing.

After the defeat of Nazi Germany in World War II, the town was transferred to the Republic of Poland and renamed Barlinek. The remaining German population was expelled in accordance with the Potsdam Agreement and the town was repopulated by Poles, many of whom were also expelled from former Eastern Poland annexed by the Soviet Union.

Between 1975 and 1998, the town belonged to Gorzów Wielkopolski Voivodeship.

== Cuisine ==
The officially protected traditional foods of Barlinek and its surroundings (as designated by the Ministry of Agriculture and Rural Development of Poland) are the Barlinek Forest Honeys (Miody Puszczy Barlineckiej). Named after their distinct floral and plant sources, the various varieties of honey include acacia, maple, phacelia, rapeseed, etc.

== Notable people ==
- Karl Wilhelm Posselt (1815–1885), German missionary active in South Africa
- Berthold Lasker (1860–1928), German physician, writer and chess master.
- Emanuel Lasker (1868–1941), German chess player, mathematician and philosopher; World Chess Champion from 1894 to 1921
- Józef Pilarz (1956–2008), Polish politician, elected to the Sejm in 2005
- Magdalena Filiks (born 1978), Polish politician, elected to the Sejm in 2019
- Dariusz Jarecki (born 1981), Polish footballer, over 260 pro games
- Marcin Matkowski (born 1981), Polish professional tennis player whose speciality is in doubles
- Adam Hrycaniuk (born 1984), Polish basketball player
- Aron Domżała (born 1989), Polish rally driver

== Twin towns and sister cities ==
Barlinek is twinned with:

- Gryfino, Poland
- Courrières, France
- Prenzlau, Germany
- Schneverdingen, Germany

== Gallery ==
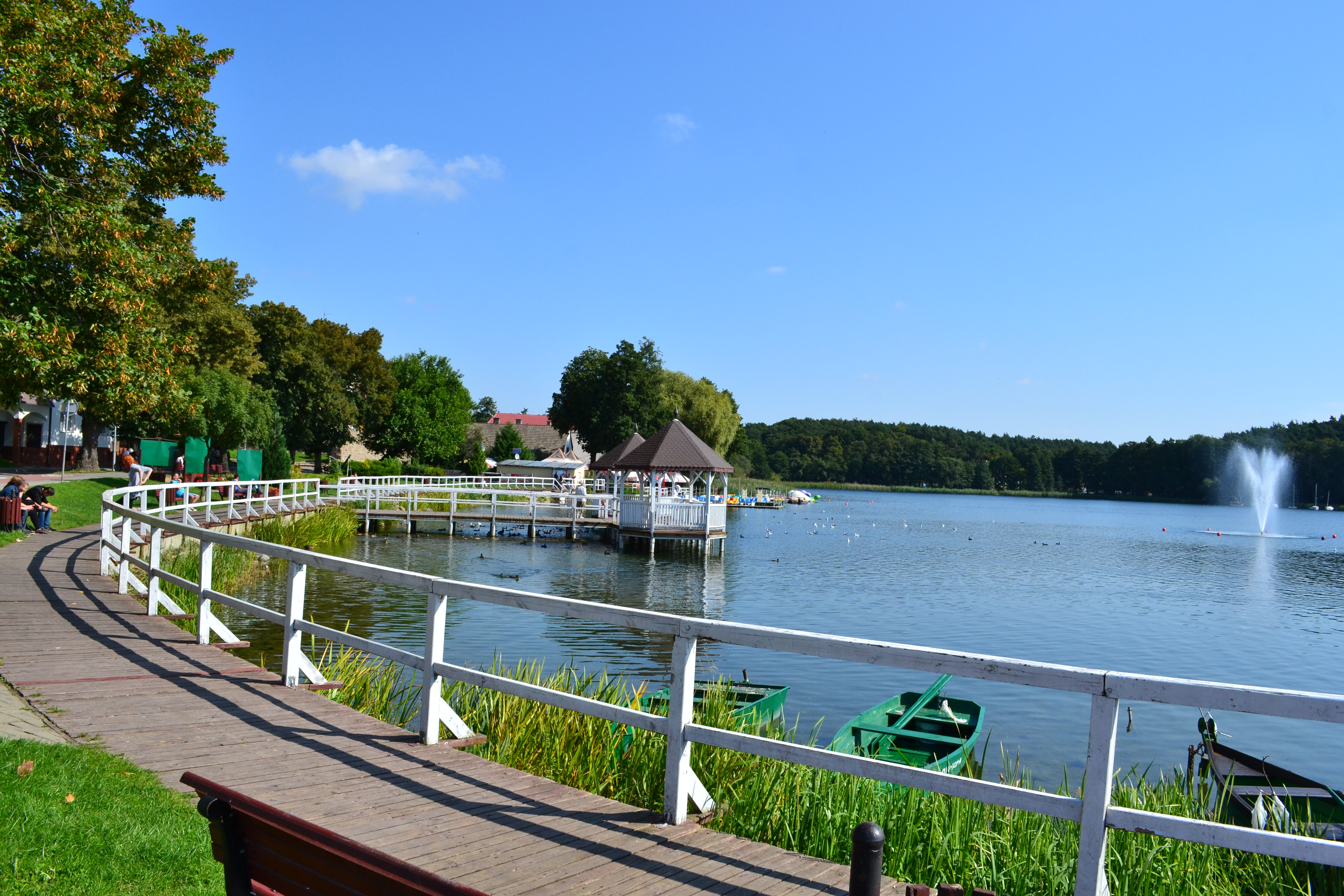
Barlinek Lake

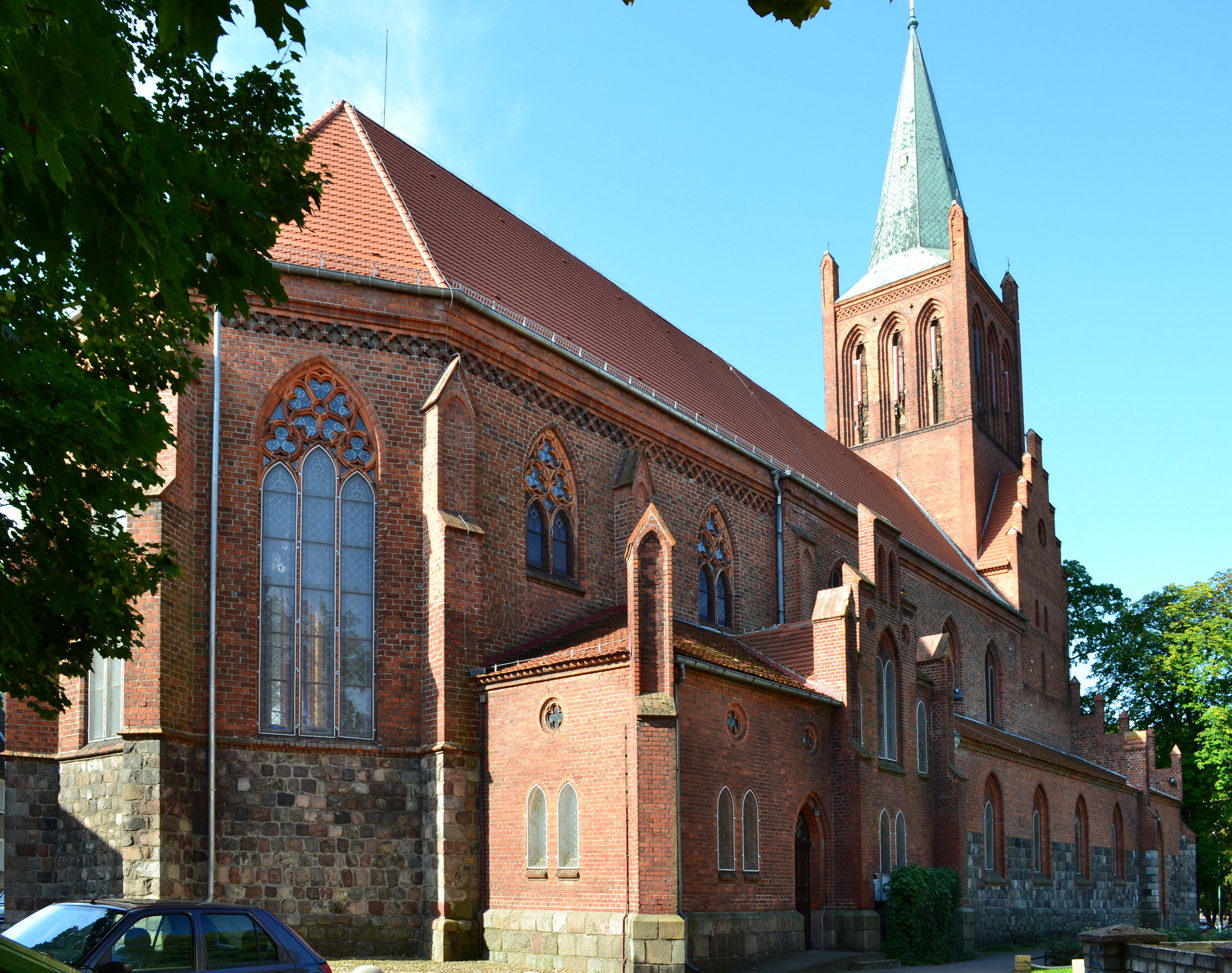
Gothic Church of the Immaculate Heart of Mary

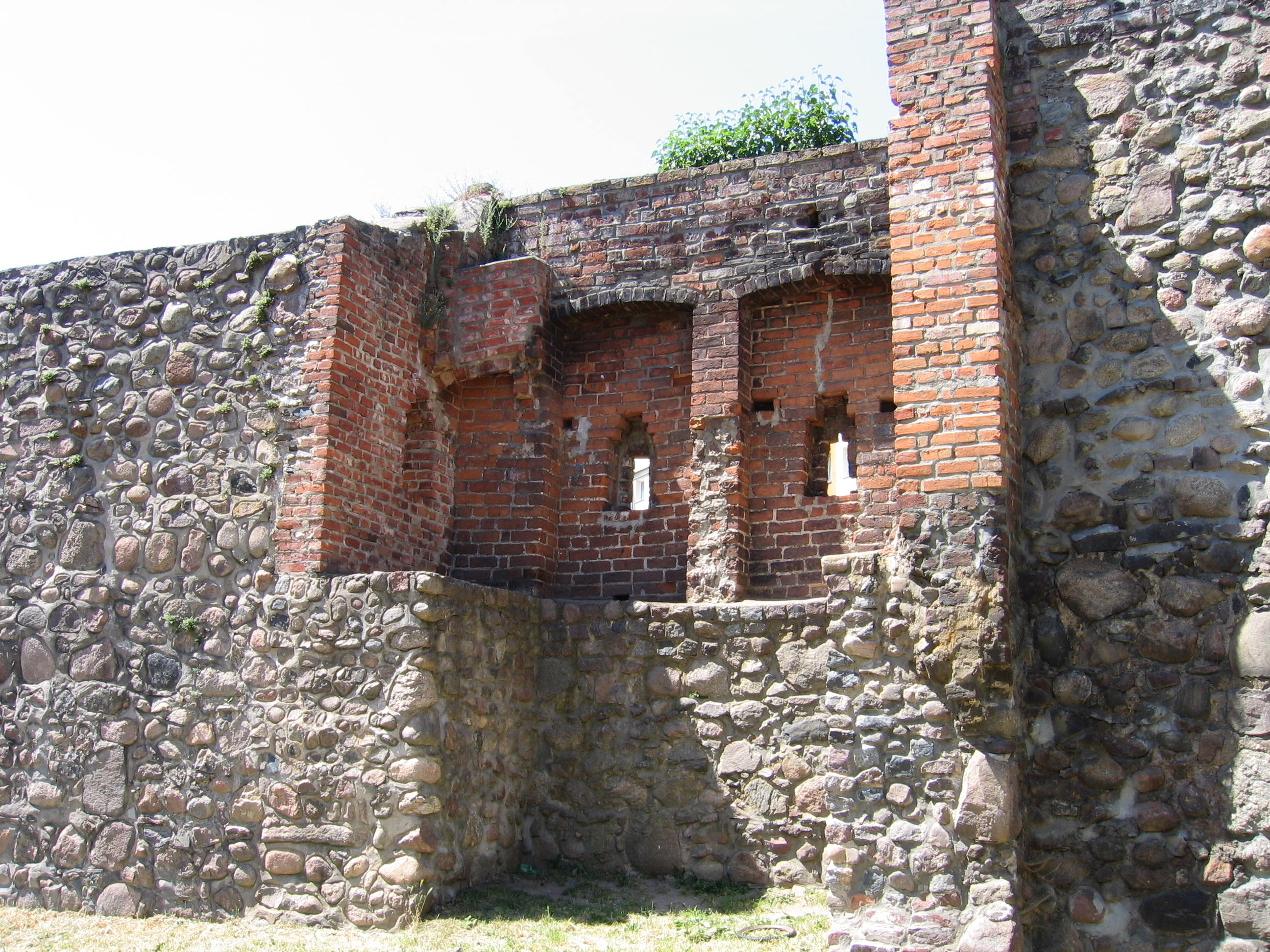
Medieval town walls

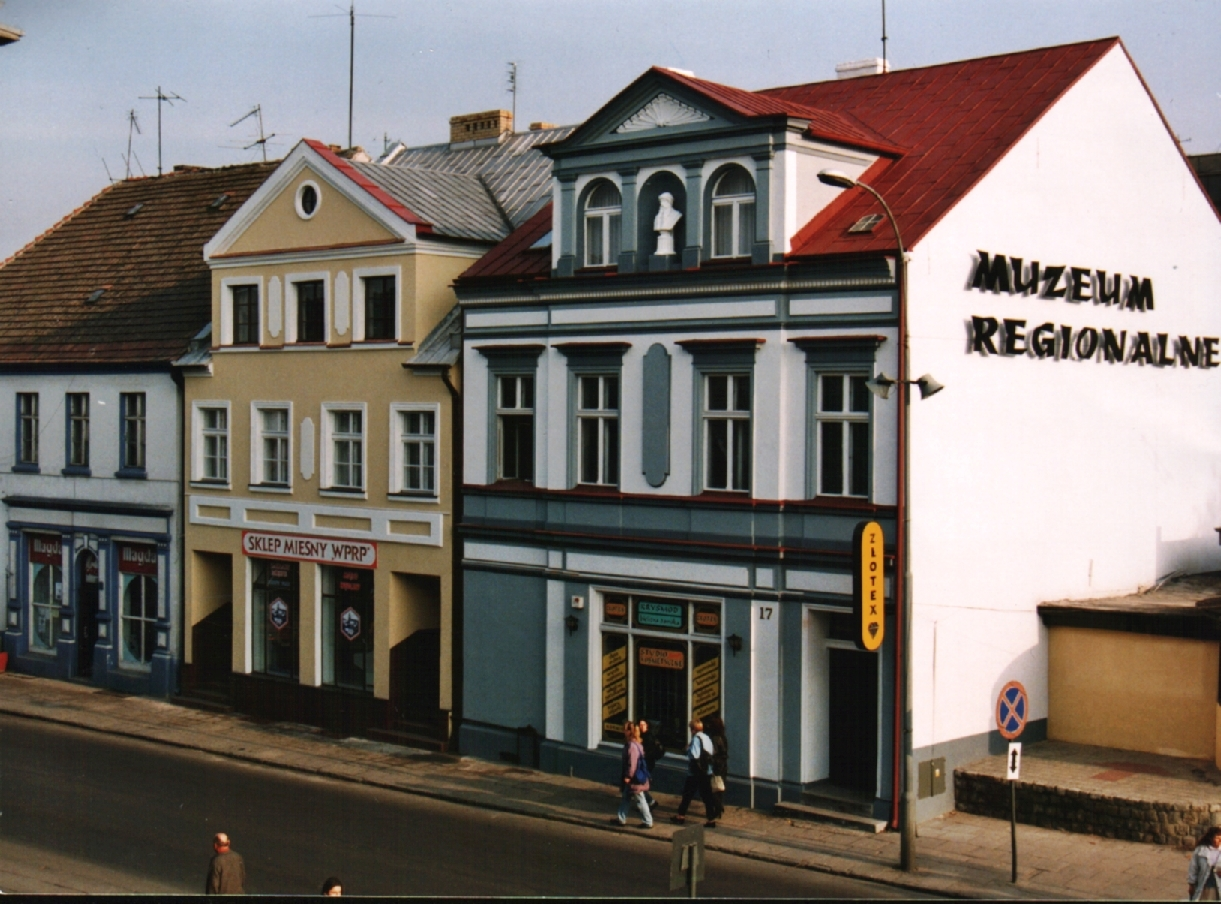
Local museum

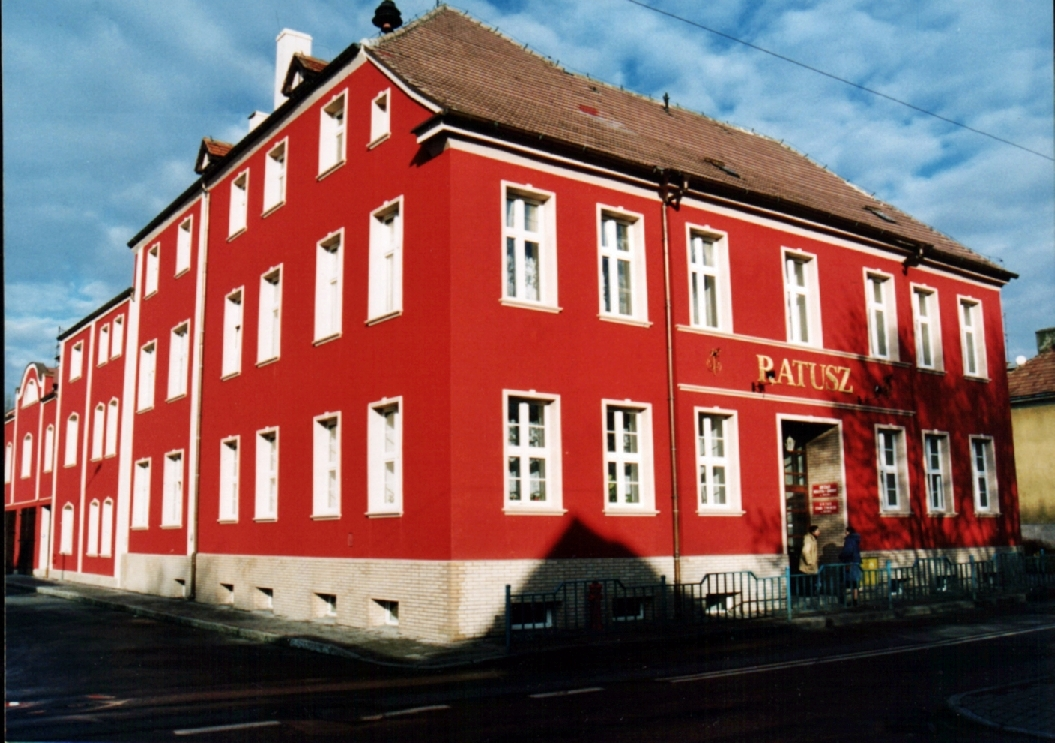
Town hall

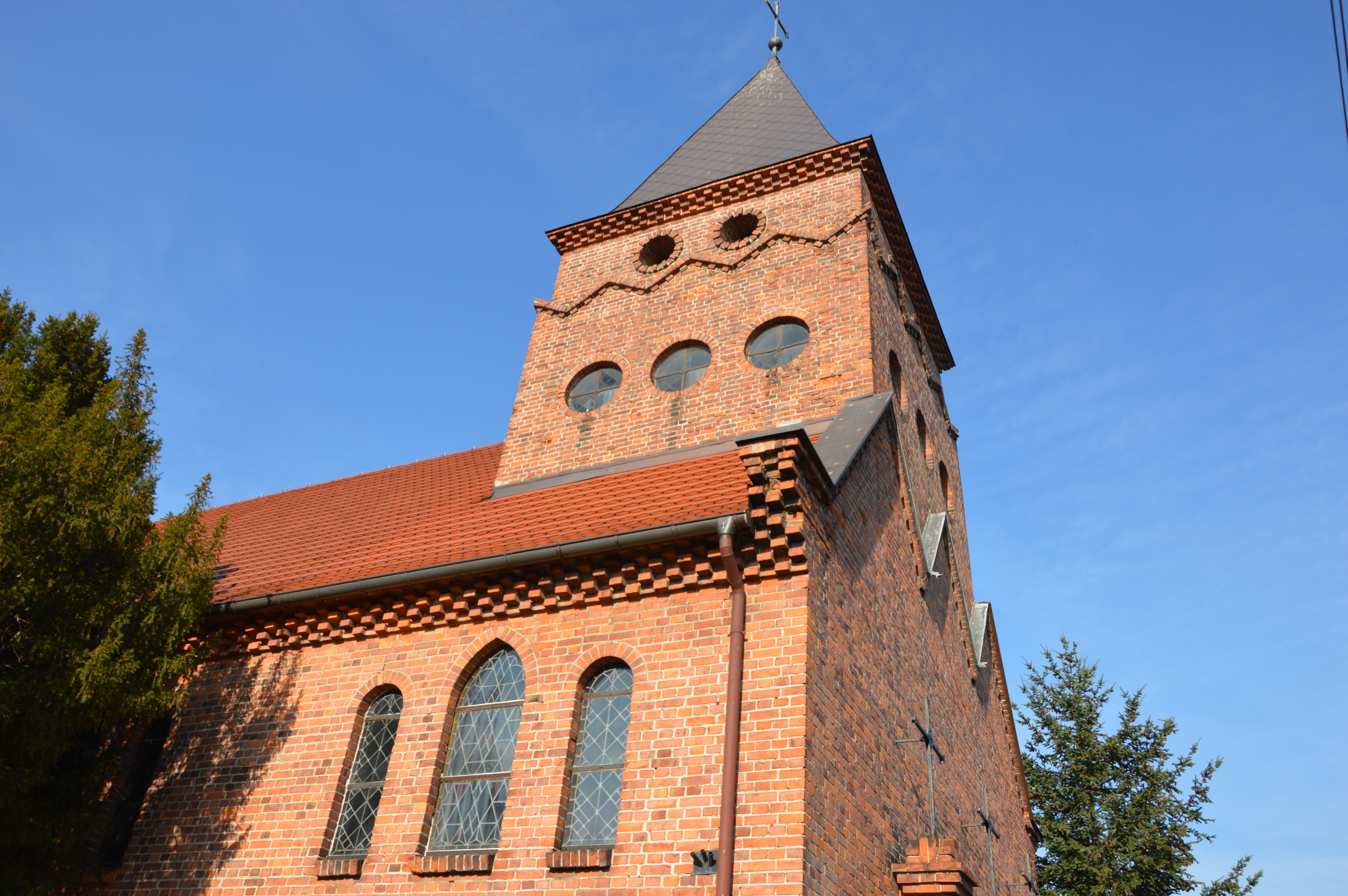
Saint Boniface church

== Transport ==
Barlinek lies on the junction of voivodeship roads 156 and 151.

The nearest railway station is in Choszczno.
