= Myślibórz =

Town in West Pomeranian Voivodeship, Poland

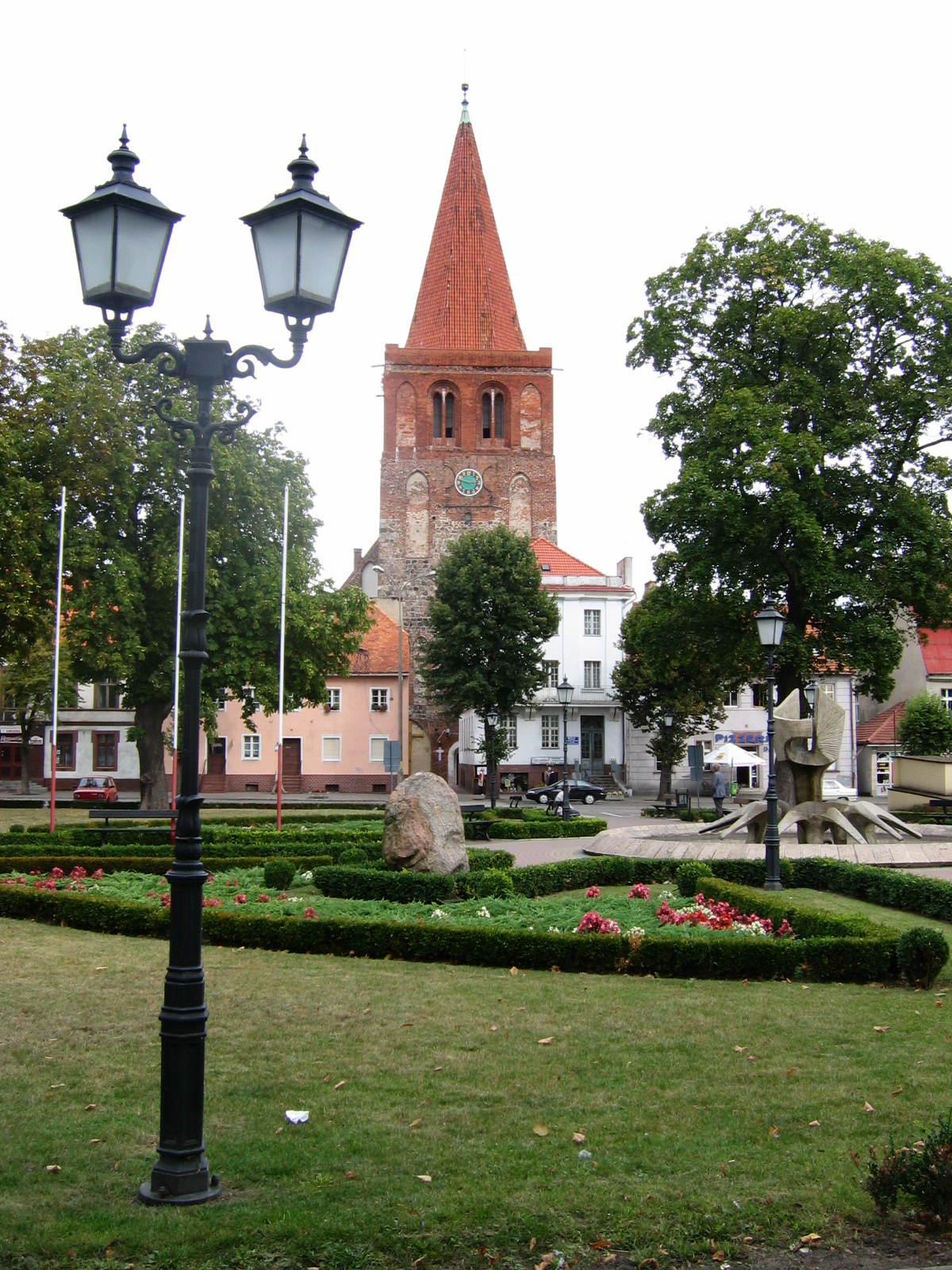
- Main square

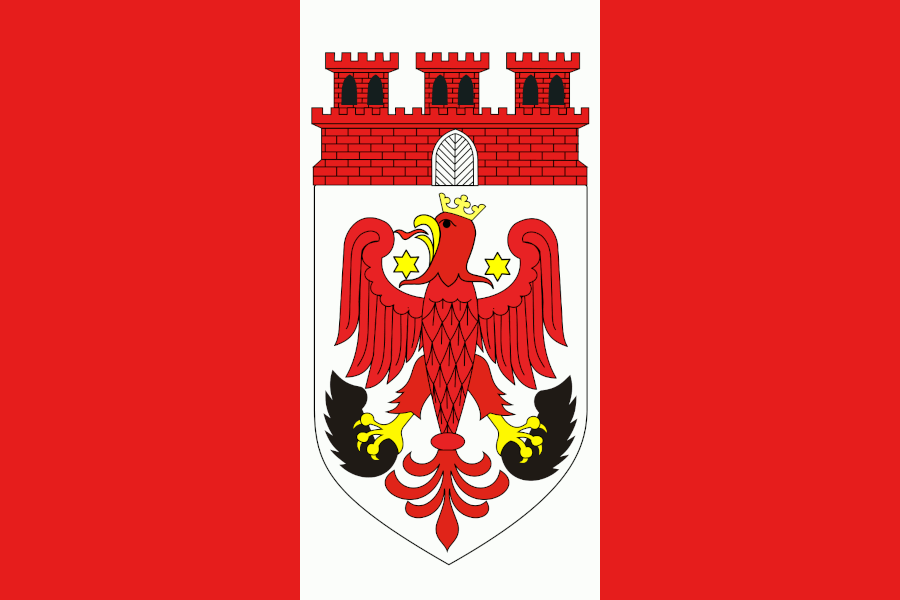
- Flag Coat of arms

- Location within Poland
- Coordinates: 52°56′N 14°52′E
- Country: Poland
- Voivodeship: West Pomeranian
- County: Myślibórz
- Gmina: Myślibórz
- Town rights: 1253

Area
  - Total: 15.04 km^{2} (5.81 sq mi)

Population (2006)
  - Total: 11,867
  - Density: 789.0/km^{2} (2,044/sq mi)
- Time zone: UTC+1 (CET)
  - Summer (DST): UTC+2 (CEST)
- Postal code: 74-300
- Area code: +48 95
- Vehicle registration: ZMY
- Website: www.mysliborz.pl

Myślibórz ([mɨˈɕlʲibuʂ]; German: Soldin) is a town in northwestern Poland, in West Pomeranian Voivodeship. It is the capital of the Myślibórz County, with a population of 11,867.

It is home to the first monastery of the Congregation of Sisters of Merciful Jesus and a sanctuary of the Divine Mercy.

== History ==
=== Middle Ages ===
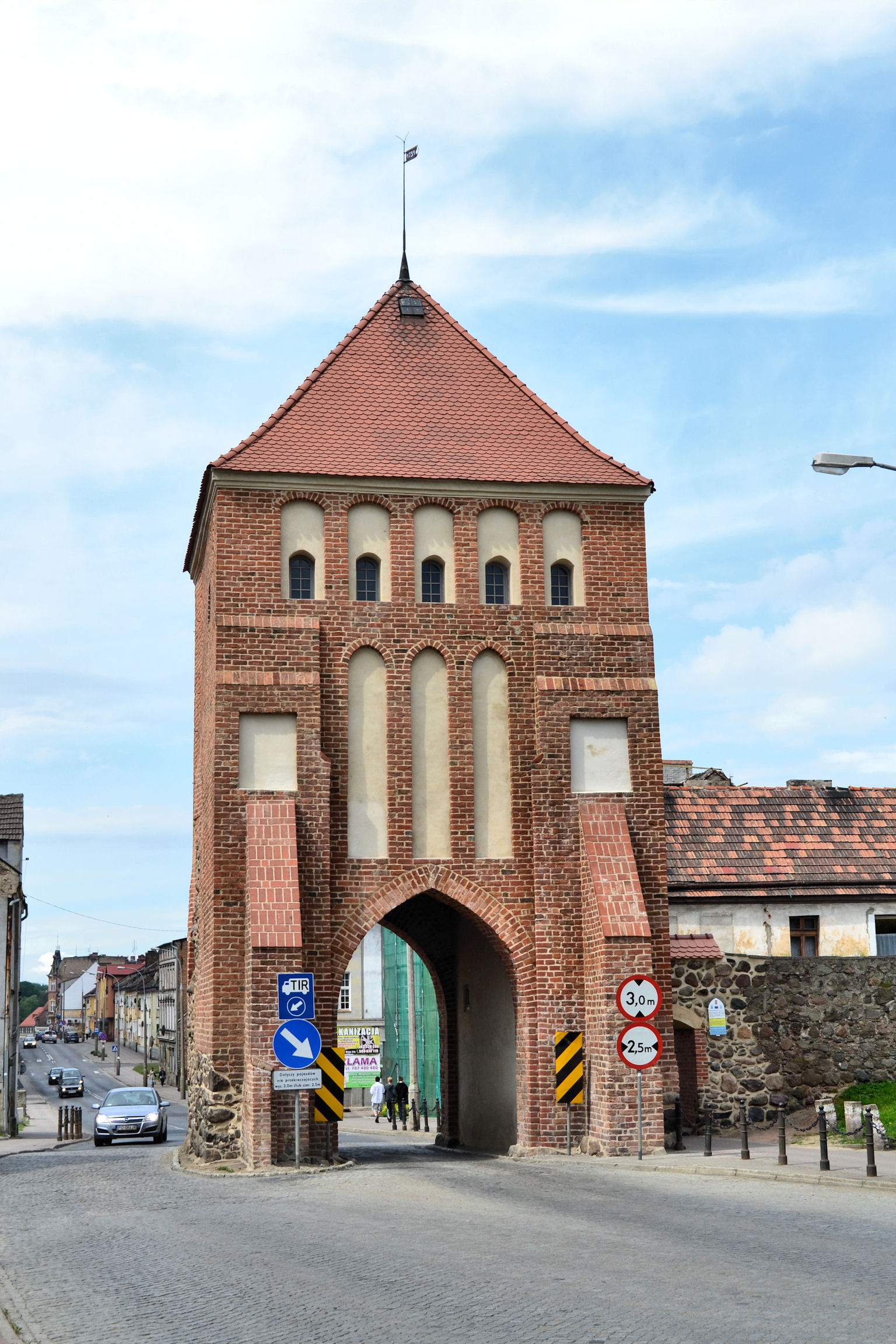
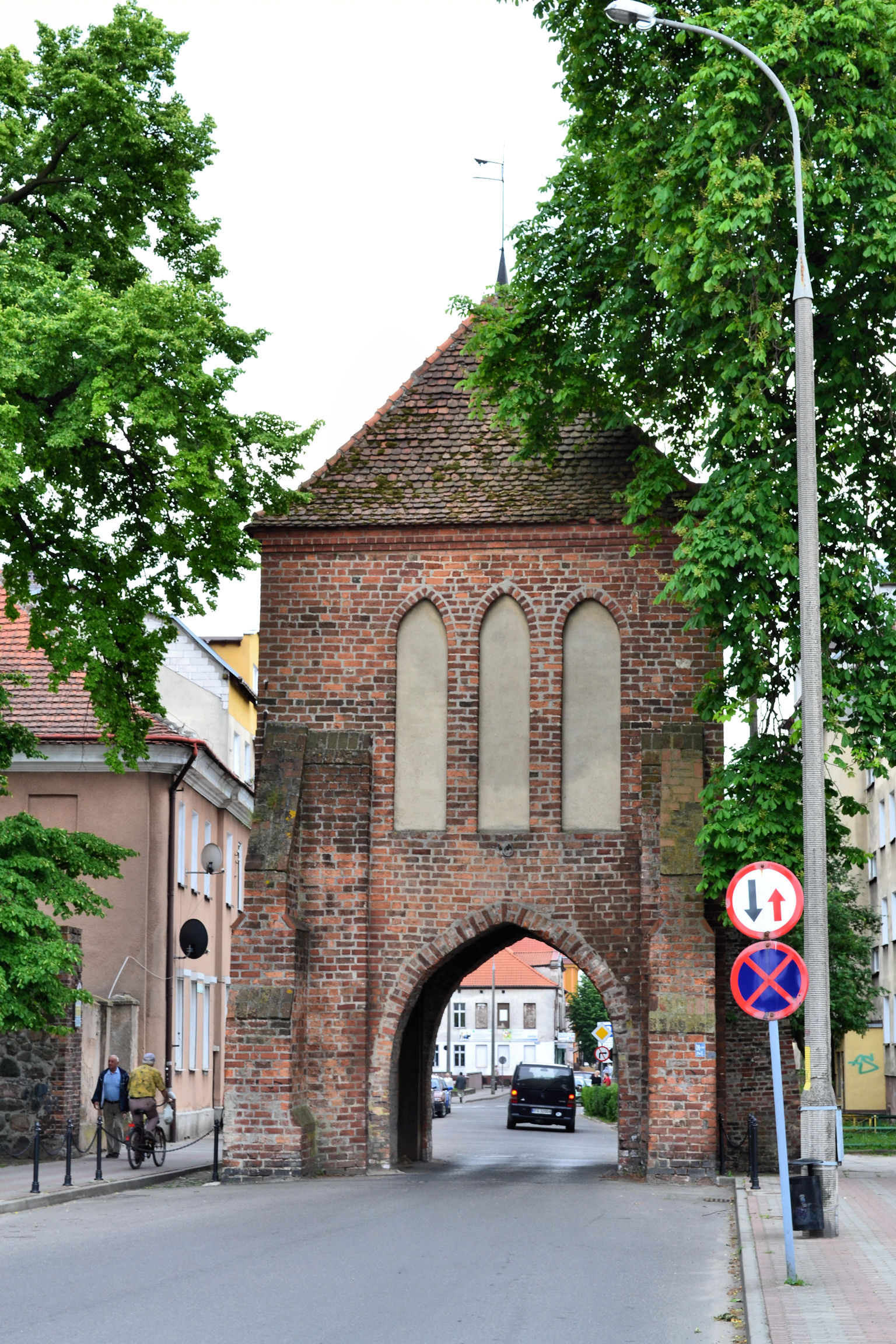
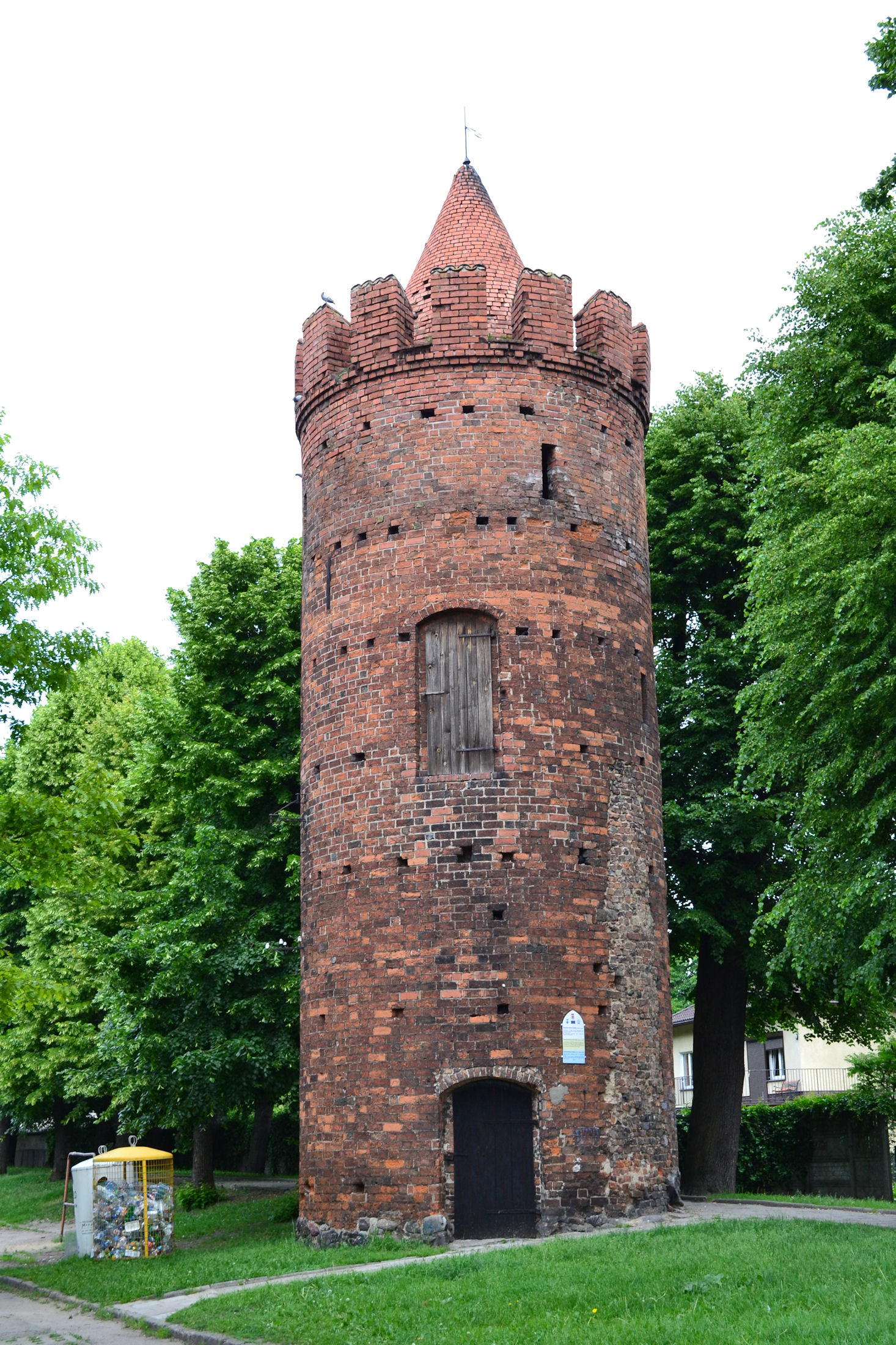
Medieval town gates and towers

The town's official webpage mentions a settlement inhabited by a pre-Slavic population belonging to the Lusatian culture on the shores of the lake (Polish: Jezioro Myśliborskie) in the 7th century, which later turned into a West Slavic or Lechitic fortress in the 10th and 11th centuries; the area was incorporated into Poland by the Piast duke Mieszko I by the end of the 10th century. According to the town's webpage, the town site was a fishing settlement called Sołtyń, located on a trading route between Silesia and Greater Poland towards the Oder delta. It is from this fishing settlement that the later German name of the town comes: Soldin.

The site was acquired as a rest house by the Dominican Order in 1234, while the fort was granted to the Knights Templar by Duke Władysław Odonic and finally sold to the Ascanian margraves John I and Otto III of Brandenburg in 1261. Together with the nearby castellany of Santok, the former Greater Polish lands were incorporated into the Brandenburgian Neumark ("New March"; Polish: Nowa Marchia) territory. The town was first mentioned as Soldin in a 1270 deed and quickly became the administrative centre of the region. A Dominican monastery was founded there in 1275. However, in the first half of the 14th century Soldin declined due to famine and political strife of the Ascanian dynasty, in the course of which the Soldin Castle was destroyed. It was the place of signing of the Treaty of Soldin (1309) between the Margraviate of Brandenburg and the Teutonic Order State.

In 1373 the New March became part of the Lands of the Bohemian Crown (or Czech Lands), ruled by the Luxembourg dynasty. In 1402, the Luxembourgs reached an agreement with Poland in Kraków. Poland was to buy and re-incorporate the region, but eventually the Luxembourgs sold it to the Teutonic Order. During the Polish–Teutonic War, in 1433 the town was destroyed by the Hussites. In 1455 the Teutonic Knights sold the town to the Margraviate of Brandenburg, now under the rule of the House of Hohenzollern, in order to raise funds for another war with Poland. Elector Frederick II had Brandenburg's suzerainty over the area formalized in the 1466 Treaty of Soldin with the Pomeranian dukes. In 1473 the town was briefly captured by Bogislaw X, Duke of Pomerania.

=== Modern era ===
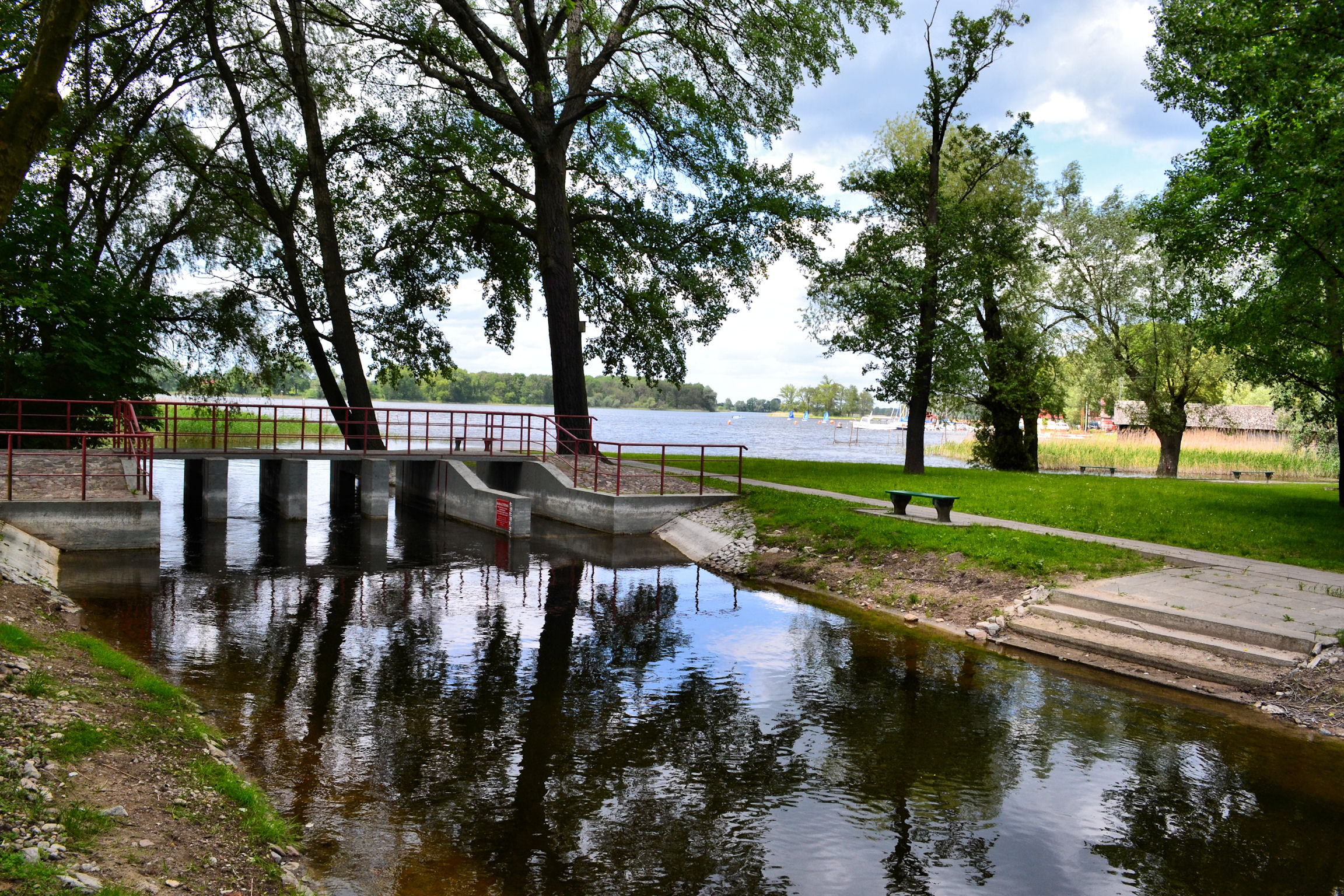
Myśliborskie Lake

In the 16th century, Margrave John of Brandenburg-Küstrin converted the Neumark to Protestantism, seceded from Brandenburg and transferred his court from Soldin to Küstrin (now Kostrzyn nad Odrą, Poland). The Dominican monastery was dissolved. Soldin suffered heavy damage in the Thirty Years War, when it was overrun by the Imperial army under Albrecht von Wallenstein marching against King Christian IV of Denmark. It began to recover only in the 18th century as a garrison town of the Kingdom of Prussia under Frederick the Great. When the German Empire was formed in 1871, Soldin was the capital of a rural district (Landkreis) within the Prussian Province of Brandenburg. In the 19th century, Soldin was largely bypassed by the industrial revolution, and was not served by rail until 1888. Electrification came in 1898, and a municipal water system only in 1912. In the nearby forest, the Lituanica plane crash occurred on 17 July 1933.

==== World War II ====
By the beginning of the Second World War in 1939, Soldin had 6,284 inhabitants. During the war, the Germans operated a forced labour subcamp of the Stalag II-D prisoner-of-war camp in the town.

The town was captured without a fight by the Red Army on 31 January 1945. After a Soviet soldier attempting to rape a local woman was shot and killed by her husband on 3 February, the Soviets rounded up 160 civilians from the town, mostly teenaged boys and elderly men, and murdered 120 of them in a nearby quarry four days later. After the discovery of the mass grave of the victims in 1995, a memorial commemorating the victims was erected.

In April 1945, a field hospital assigned to the First Polish Army was based in the town, treating Soviet and Polish soldiers. On 13–15 April 1945, the quartermaster of the First Polish Army was stationed in the town.

With the end of the war in 1945, the partly depopulated area was transferred to Poland under border changes promulgated at the Potsdam Conference, although with a Soviet-installed communist regime, which stayed in power until the Fall of Communism in the 1980s. The surviving German population was expelled in accordance with the Potsdam Agreement and the town was gradually repopulated by Polish people.

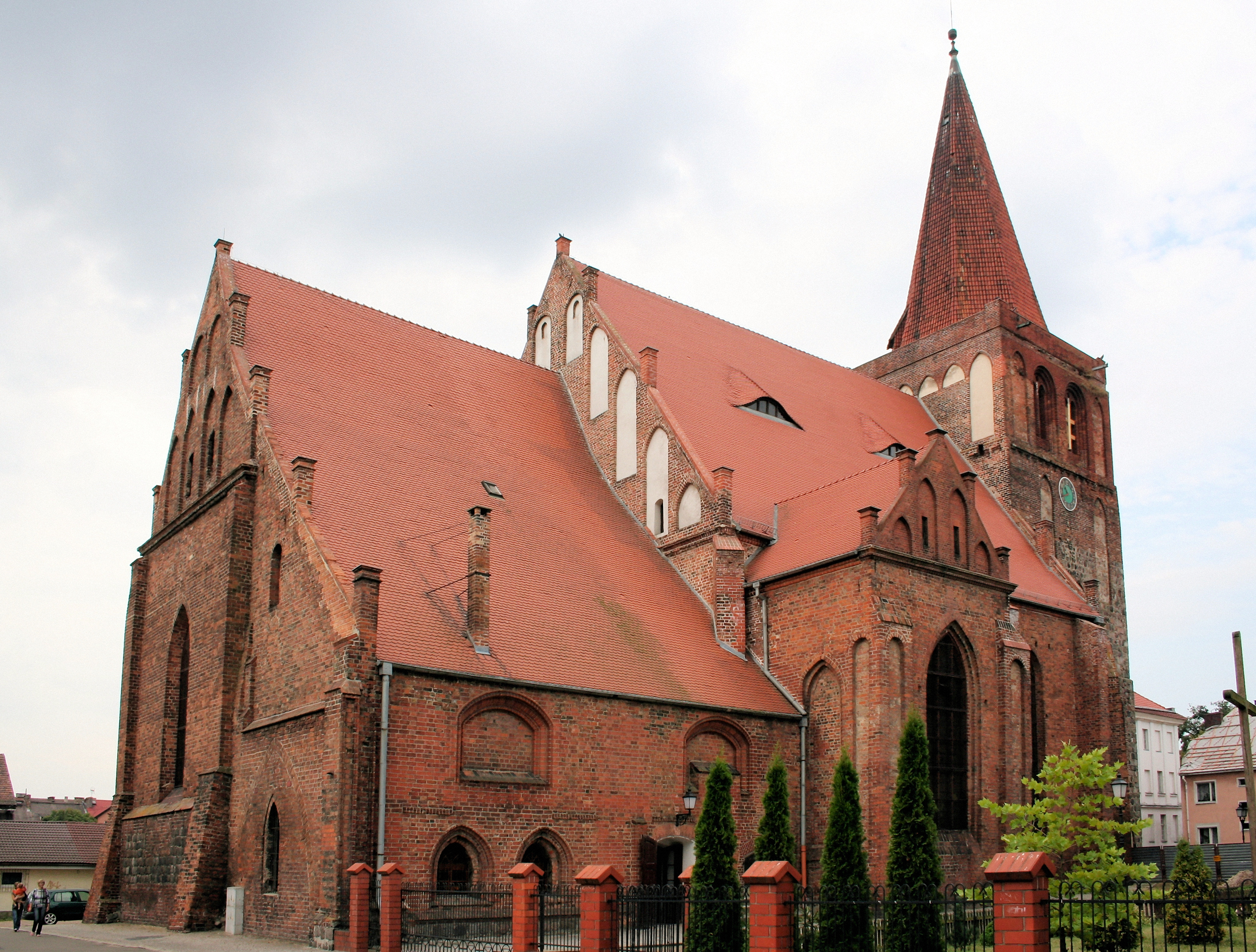
Collegiate church of St. John the Baptist

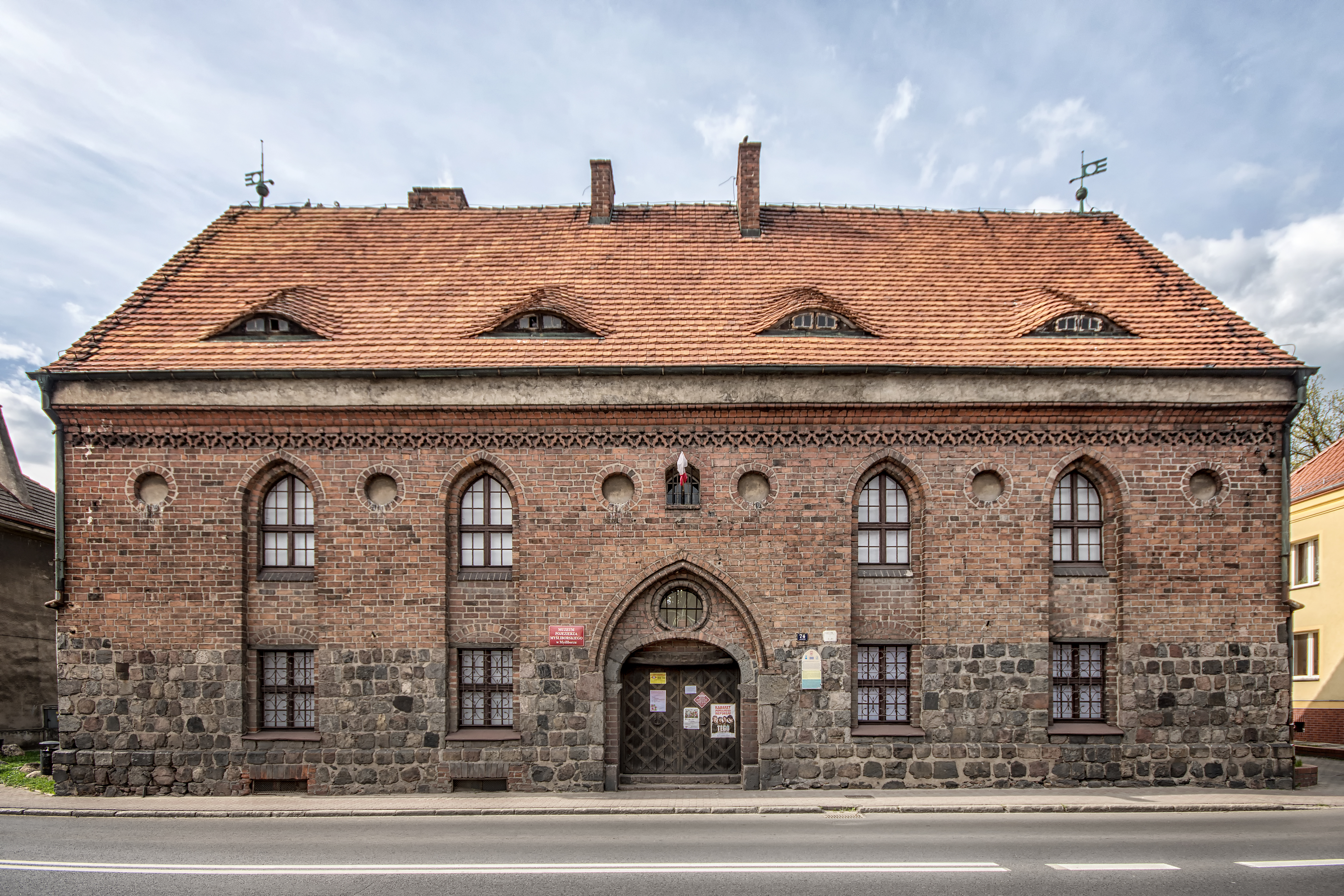
Myślibórz Lake District Museum

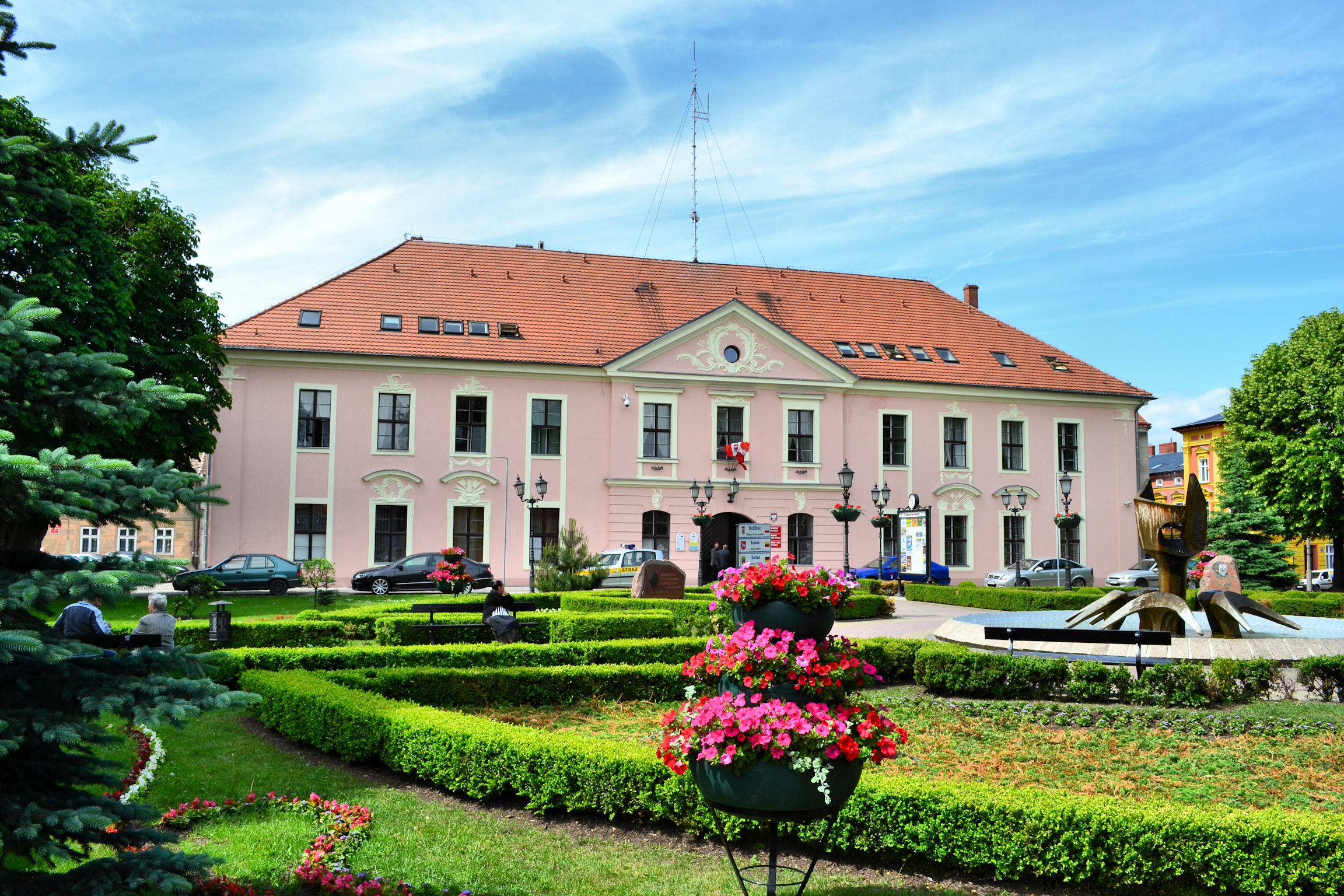
Town hall

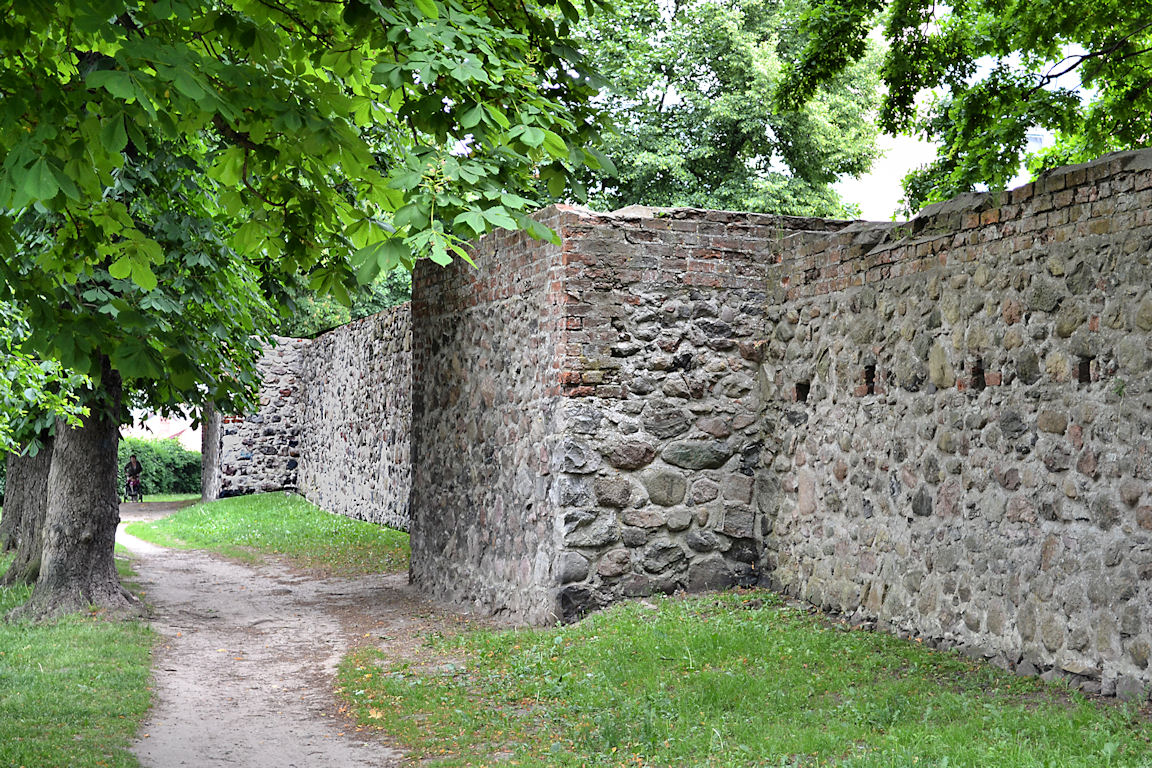
Defensive walls

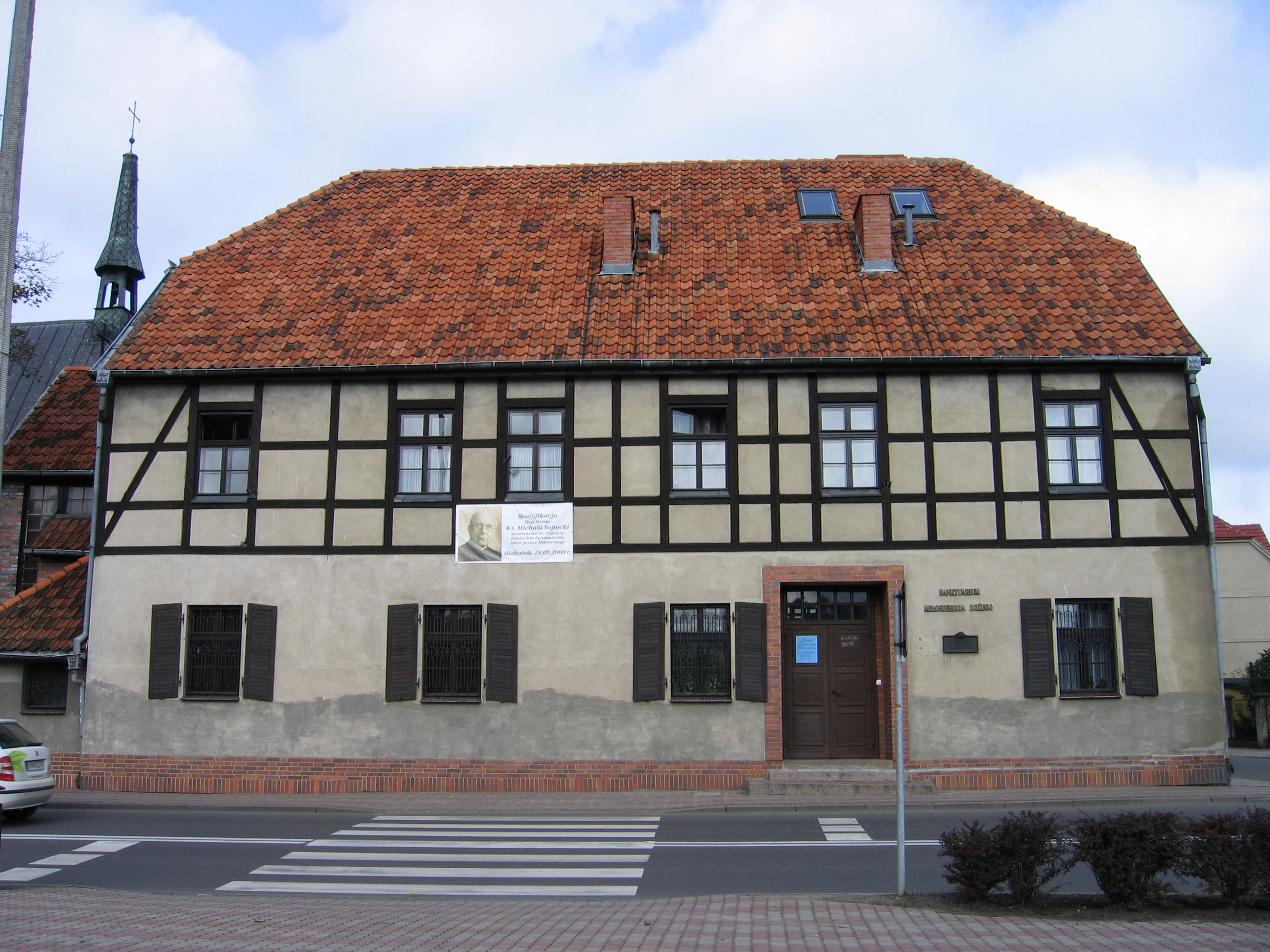
Congregation of Sisters of Merciful Jesus

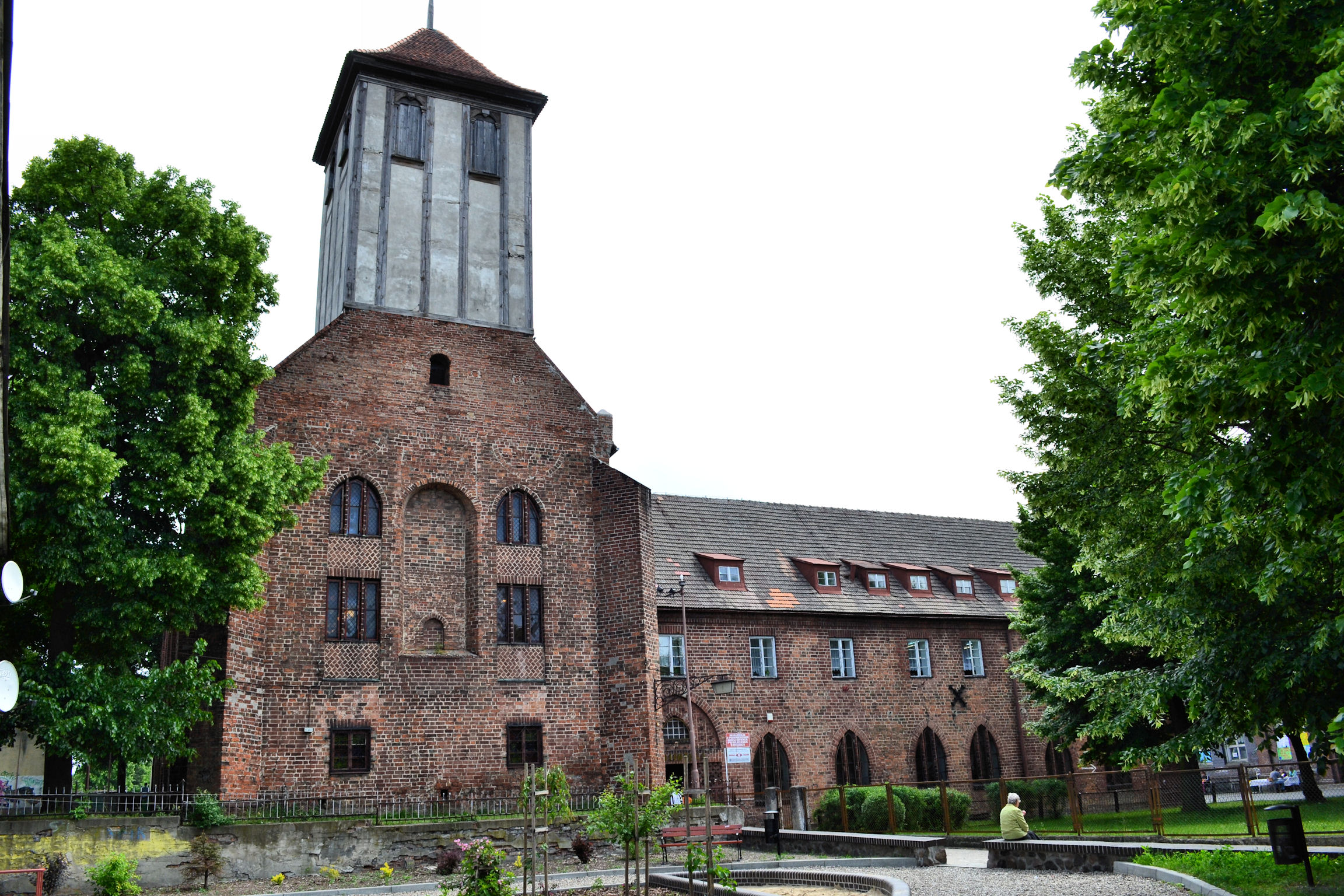
Dominican Monastery

==== Post-war period ====
In the following years, the Polish anti-communist resistance was active in Myślibórz, including the local Młodzi Andersowcy youth organization.

It was a county centre initially in Szczecin Voivodeship (1945–1975), then in Gorzów Voivodeship (1975–1998), finally in West Pomeranian Voivodeship since 31 December 1998.

== Notable residents ==
- Friedrich Wilhelm von Dossow (1669–1758), Prussian field marshal
- August Piepenhagen (1791–1868), German landscape painter
- Daniel Lessmann (1794–1831), German-Jewish historian and poet.
- Hermann Kennemann (1815–1910), Prussian politician and landowner, co-founder of the German Eastern Marches Society
- Anna Schepeler-Lette (1829–1897), German politician, feminist and women's social reformer.
- Heino Schmieden (1835–1913), German architect
- Max Fesca (1846–1917), German specialist in agricultural science and agronomy
- William C. Rauschenberger (1855–1918), German-American mayor of Milwaukee
- Gisela Kallenbach (born 1944), German politician, MEP for Alliance '90/The Greens,
- Jan Grabowski (1950–2017), Polish speedway rider
- Adam Ostolski (born 1978), Polish politician, activist and sociologist.
- Adam Hrycaniuk (born 1984), Polish basketball player for Stelmet Zielona Góra of the Polish Basketball League.

== Twin towns ==
Myślibórz is twinned with:

- Kaunas, Lithuania
- Neuhardenberg, Germany
- Soltau, Germany
