= Chwarszczany =

- Village
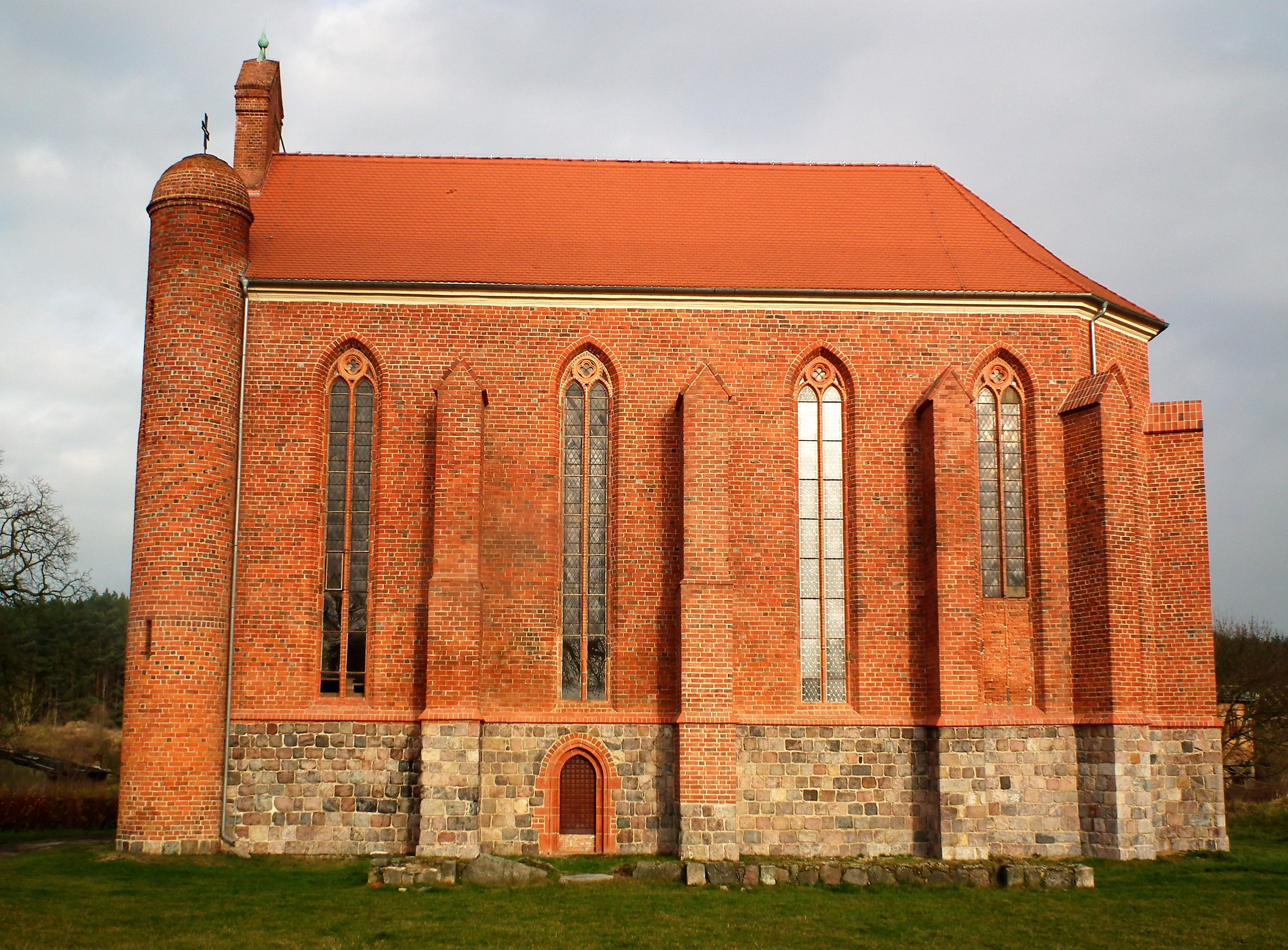
- Church of Saint Stanisław Kostka (former Templar chapel) at Chwarszczany

- Location within Poland
- Coordinates: 52°41′13″N 14°38′9″E
- Country: Poland
- Voivodeship: West Pomeranian
- County: Myślibórz
- Gmina: Boleszkowice

Population
  - Total: 222
- Time zone: UTC+1 (CET)
  - Summer (DST): UTC+2 (CEST)
- Vehicle registration: ZMY

Chwarszczany [xfarʂˈt͡ʂanɨ] (German: Quartschen) is a village in the administrative district of Gmina Boleszkowice, within Myślibórz County, West Pomeranian Voivodeship, in north-western Poland, close to the German border. It lies on the river Myśla, approximately 6 km (4 mi) south-east of Boleszkowice, 32 km (20 mi) south-west of Myślibórz, and 82 km (51 mi) south of the regional capital Szczecin. It is located at the junction of voivodeship road 127 and national road 31. The village has a population of 222.

== Chwarszczany Chapel ==
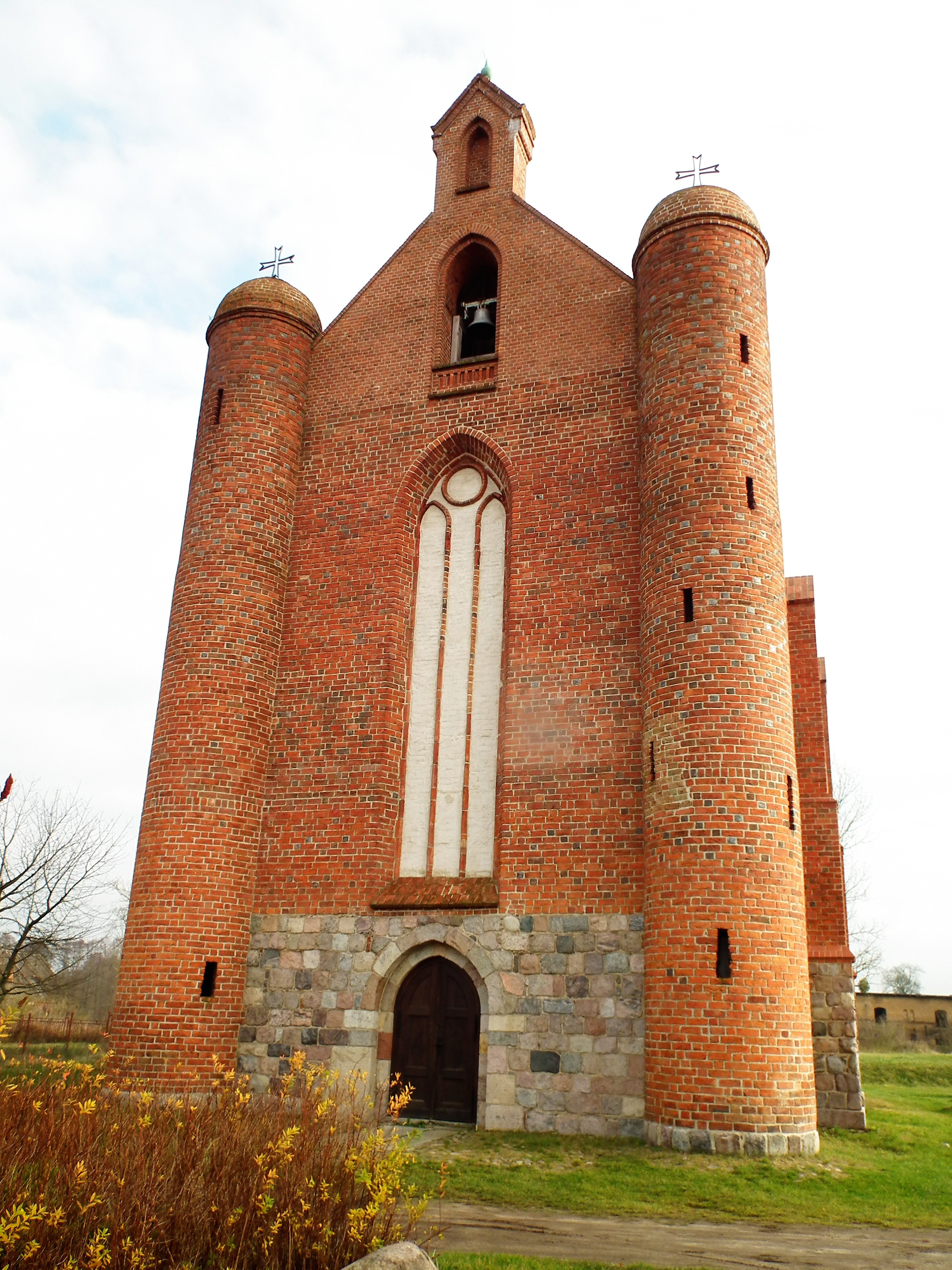
Facade of the church and former Templar chapel

The origins of this chapel lie in the gift to the Knights Templar of 1,000 hides of land (1 hide is approximately 17 hectares) by Władysław Odonic, Duke of Greater Poland, in 1232. This land was in the Kostrzyn region and centred on the town. This donation fulfilled more than simply religious reasons, as it provided a safeguard in a borderland and enabled the settlement of the area. The Dukes of Pomerania, however, considered this whole district as belonging to their castle of Kinice, and not to Kostrzyn and Santok. In order to avoid being expelled from the area they hurried to make their own donation. Thus, in 1234 Barnim I, the Duke of Pomerania, gave the Templars a further 200 hides which were centered on Dargomyśl, pointing out that this land is located in his own territory.

It is not known where the Templars of Chwarszczany came from, but it may have been the Silesian commandery in Oleśnica Mała. In 1241 the property portfolio of the Templars was expanded with the addition of Lubno and Oborzany, donated by Włast, a Polish magnate. By the middle of the 13th century, the Brandenburg margraves of the Ascanian dynasty gained control of the property. Following disputation, in 1261 an agreement was reached between the Templars and the margraves: the Templars ceded rights to a commandery in Myślibórz, and gave up lands situated by the road from Kostrzyn to Gorzów. In return they received confirmation of the possession of Chwarszczany with ten villages with the addition of the village of Kaleńsko.

In 1286 Otto VI, Margrave of Brandenburg-Salzwedel, entered the monastery in the town, giving the commandery greater significance. In the 1290s Bernhard von Eberstein became the Templar preceptor of Poland, Neumark, Bohemia and Moravia. In 1308, a member of the order Günther von Köthen sold the village of Cychry belonging to the commandery to two brothers of the rich Hokemann family of Frankfurt upon Oder. This is the last mention of the Templars in the area, with the chapel being taken over by the Hospitallers following the suppression of the Templars.
