= Wielopole, West Pomeranian Voivodeship =

Wielopole
- Abandoned settlement
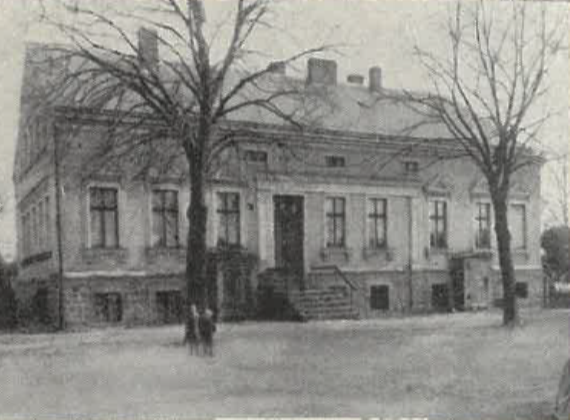
- Manor house before 1945

- Location within Poland
- Coordinates: 52°41′53″N 14°28′50″E
- Country: Poland
- Voivodeship: West Pomeranian
- County: Myślibórz
- Gmina: Boleszkowice
- Population (2020): 0

Wielopole [vjɛlɔˈpɔlɛ] (German: Feldichen) is a former settlement in the Gmina Boleszkowice, within Myślibórz County, West Pomeranian Voivodeship, in north-western Poland, close to the German border. Since 2014, the settlement has been abandoned.

== Geography ==
Wielopole administratively belongs to the sołectwo of Namyślin in the Gmina Boleszkowice. It lies approximately 7 km (4 mi) west of the municipal centre in Boleszkowice, 37 km (23 mi) south-west of Myślibórz, and 81 km (50 mi) south of the regional capital Szczecin. Slightly north-east of Wielopole lies Milicz.

The settlement lies within the Warta Mouth Landscape Park, specifically in the deciduous Namyślin Forest District (Polish: Leśnictwa Namyślin, formerly German: Forst Neumühl). The forest is primarily dominated by linden, acacia, maple, beech, and horse chestnut trees. A large linden tree with a trunk circumference of 350 cm (138 in) grows in the courtyard of the former manor house, within the manor park there also lies an abandoned German cemetery. Adjacent to the former settlement is a pond.

== History ==
The settlement was originally known by the German name Felde-Goeß (1718/9) later changed to Feldichen, a name it maintained until the annexation by Poland after World War II. Feldichen was a Gut (and Gutsbezirk) in the district of Königsberg in der Neumark in Prussia, belonging to the postal office or district (Postamt) of Neumühl-Kutzdorf and the Amtsgericht Küstrin.

In 1856 also known by the name Feldchengös, it was a Vorwerk that yielded 316 Thalers in annual lease rent (Erbpacht) and 15 Thalers in ground tax. It belonged to the protestant church parish of Bärwalde.

In 1896, the estate, which was encompassed 84 ha (208 acres) of total land area, was owned by August Kiele who paid 824 Reichsmark in ground taxes.

After the flight and expulsion of Germans from the area as a consequence of World War II, the settlement was given its modern Polish name of Wielopole. Between 1975 and 1998, Wielopole was part of the Gorzów Voivodeship.

The population of the settlement had decreased to 2 by 2003 and the settlement has been abandoned since 2014.

== Demographics ==
Historical population

Year	Pop.	±%
1867	7	—
1880	6	−14.3%
1885	6	+0.0%
1894	38	+533.3%
1985	31	−18.4%

Year	Pop.	±%
1990	17	−45.2%
2003	2	−88.2%
2014	0	−100.0%
2020	0	0.00%

Data may be affected by territorial fluctuation.
Sources: 1867, 1880, 1885, 1894, 1985-2014, 2020
