= Lysak =

Lysak may refer to:

- Lysak (surname)
- Łysak, Warmian-Masurian Voivodeship, Poland
