= Łatana =

Łatana may refer to the following places in Poland:

- Łatana Mała
- Łatana Wielka
