= Jankowo =

Jankowo may refer to the following places:

- Jankowo, Inowrocław County in Kuyavian-Pomeranian Voivodeship (north-central Poland)
- Jankowo, Lipno County in Kuyavian-Pomeranian Voivodeship (north-central Poland)
- Jankowo, Masovian Voivodeship (east-central Poland)
- Jankowo, Poznań County in Greater Poland Voivodeship (west-central Poland)
- Jankowo, Wągrowiec County in Greater Poland Voivodeship (west-central Poland)
- Jankowo, Elbląg County in Warmian-Masurian Voivodeship (north Poland)
- Jankowo, Kętrzyn County in Warmian-Masurian Voivodeship (north Poland)
- Jankowo, Olsztyn County in Warmian-Masurian Voivodeship (north Poland)
- Jankowo, Szczytno County in Warmian-Masurian Voivodeship (north Poland)
- Jankowo, West Pomeranian Voivodeship (north-west Poland)
