= Wysoka (disambiguation) =

Wysoka may refer to the following places in Poland:

- Wysoka, a town in Greater Poland Voivodeship (west-central Poland)
- Wysoka, Polkowice County in Lower Silesian Voivodeship (south-west Poland)
- Wysoka, Wrocław County in Lower Silesian Voivodeship (south-west Poland)
- Wysoka, Gmina Tuchola in Kuyavian-Pomeranian Voivodeship (north-central Poland)
- Wysoka, Gmina Cekcyn in Kuyavian-Pomeranian Voivodeship (north-central Poland)
- Wysoka, Wadowice County in Lesser Poland Voivodeship (south Poland)
- Wysoka, Subcarpathian Voivodeship (south-east Poland)
- Wysoka, Sucha County in Lesser Poland Voivodeship (south Poland)
- Wysoka, Masovian Voivodeship (east-central Poland)
- Wysoka, Wągrowiec County in Greater Poland Voivodeship (west-central Poland)
- Wysoka, Gorzów County in Lubusz Voivodeship (west Poland)
- Wysoka, Międzyrzecz County in Lubusz Voivodeship (west Poland)
- Wysoka, Zielona Góra County in Lubusz Voivodeship (west Poland)
- Wysoka, Głubczyce County in Opole Voivodeship (south-west Poland)
- Wysoka, Olesno County in Opole Voivodeship (south-west Poland)
- Wysoka, Strzelce County in Opole Voivodeship (south-west Poland)
- Wysoka, Słupsk County in Pomeranian Voivodeship (north Poland)
- Wysoka, Starogard County in Pomeranian Voivodeship (north Poland)
- Wysoka, Działdowo County in Warmian-Masurian Voivodeship (north Poland)
- Wysoka, Elbląg County in Warmian-Masurian Voivodeship (north Poland)
- Wysoka, West Pomeranian Voivodeship (north-west Poland)
