= Przeździęk =

Przeździęk may refer to the following places in Poland:

- Przeździęk Mały
- Przeździęk Wielki
