= Krześnica =

- Village
- Location within Poland
- Coordinates: 52°39′27″N 14°43′16″E
- Country: Poland
- Voivodeship: West Pomeranian
- County: Myślibórz
- Gmina: Dębno
- Elevation: 58 m (190 ft)
- Population: 381

Krześnica [kʂɛɕˈnit͡sa] (German: Wilkersdorf) is a village in the administrative district of Gmina Dębno, within Myślibórz County, West Pomeranian Voivodeship, in north-western Poland. It lies approximately 9 km (6 mi) south of Dębno, 33 km (21 mi) south of Myślibórz, and 85 km (53 mi) south of the regional capital Szczecin.

For the history of the region, see History of Pomerania.

The village has an estimated population of 381.
