= Suchlica =

- Village
- Location within Poland
- Coordinates: 52°40′28″N 14°40′40″E
- Country: Poland
- Voivodeship: West Pomeranian
- County: Myślibórz
- Gmina: Dębno
- Elevation: 60 m (200 ft)
- Population: 139

Suchlica [suˈxlit͡sa] (German: Neu Zicher) is a village in the administrative district of Gmina Dębno, within Myślibórz County, West Pomeranian Voivodeship, in north-western Poland. It lies approximately 7 km (4 mi) south of Dębno, 32 km (20 mi) south-west of Myślibórz, and 83 km (52 mi) south of the regional capital Szczecin.

The village has a population of 139.

== See also ==
History of Pomerania
