= Mostno =

- Village
- Location within Poland
- Coordinates: 52°44′42″N 14°45′58″E
- Country: Poland
- Voivodeship: West Pomeranian
- County: Myślibórz
- Gmina: Dębno
- Elevation: 44 m (144 ft)
- Population: 206

Mostno [ˈmɔstnɔ] (formerly German Kerstenbrügge) is a village in the administrative district of Gmina Dębno, within Myślibórz County, West Pomeranian Voivodeship, in north-western Poland. It lies approximately 5 km (3 mi) east of Dębno, 22 km (14 mi) south of Myślibórz, and 76 km (47 mi) south of the regional capital Szczecin.

The village has a population of 206.
