= Śliwice =

Śliwice may refer to the following places in Poland:

- Śliwice, Lower Silesian Voivodeship (south-west Poland)
- Śliwice, Kuyavian-Pomeranian Voivodeship (north-central Poland)
- Śliwice, Opole Voivodeship (south-west Poland)
- Śliwice, Warmian-Masurian Voivodeship (north Poland)
