= Młyniska, Myślibórz County =

Młyniska
- Village
- Location within Poland
- Coordinates: 52°38′19″N 14°42′17″E
- Country: Poland
- Voivodeship: West Pomeranian
- County: Myślibórz
- Gmina: Dębno
- Population: 118

Młyniska [mwɨˈniska] is a village in the administrative district of Gmina Dębno, within Myślibórz County, West Pomeranian Voivodeship, in north-western Poland. It lies approximately 11 km (7 mi) south of Dębno, 35 km (22 mi) south of Myślibórz, and 87 km (54 mi) south of the regional capital Szczecin.

For the history of the region, see History of Pomerania.
