= Smolnica, West Pomeranian Voivodeship =

Smolnica
- Village
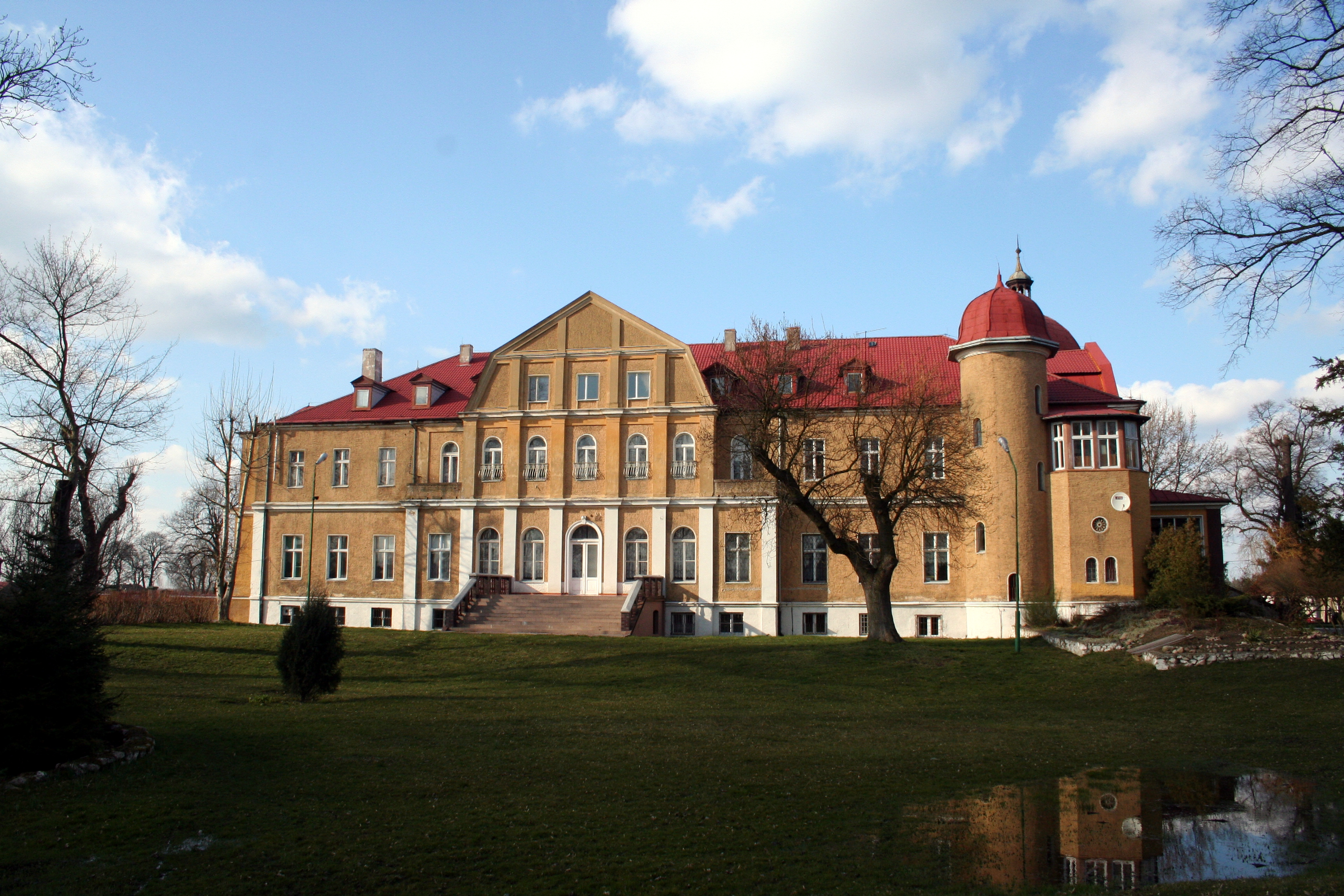
- Smolnica Palace

- Location within Poland
- Coordinates: 52°47′N 14°38′E
- Country: Poland
- Voivodeship: West Pomeranian
- County: Myślibórz
- Gmina: Dębno
- Elevation: 61 m (200 ft)

Population
  - Total: 577
- Time zone: UTC+1 (CET)
  - Summer (DST): UTC+2 (CEST)
- Vehicle registration: ZMY
- Website: http://www.smolnica.cba.pl/

Smolnica [smɔlˈnit͡sa] is a village in the administrative district of Gmina Dębno, within Myślibórz County, West Pomeranian Voivodeship, in north-western Poland. It lies approximately 8 km (5 mi) north-west of Dębno, 23 km (14 mi) south-west of Myślibórz, and 71 km (44 mi) south of the regional capital Szczecin.

The village has a population of 577.
