= Więcław, Gmina Dębno =

Więcław
- Village
- Location within Poland
- Coordinates: 52°45′49″N 14°45′3″E
- Country: Poland
- Voivodeship: West Pomeranian
- County: Myślibórz
- Gmina: Dębno
- Elevation: 44 m (144 ft)
- Population: 204

Więcław [ˈvjɛnt͡swaf] (formerly German Bornhofen) is a village in the administrative district of Gmina Dębno, within Myślibórz County, West Pomeranian Voivodeship, in north-western Poland. It lies approximately 5 km (3 mi) north-east of Dębno, 21 km (13 mi) south-west of Myślibórz, and 74 km (46 mi) south of the regional capital Szczecin.

For the history of the region, see History of Pomerania.

The village has a population of 204.
