= Borne, Myślibórz County =

Borne
- Settlement
- Location within Poland
- Coordinates: 52°47′50″N 14°50′11″E
- Country: Poland
- Voivodeship: West Pomeranian
- County: Myślibórz
- Gmina: Dębno
- Population: 4

Borne [ˈbɔrnɛ] (German Borne) is a settlement in the administrative district of Gmina Dębno, within Myślibórz County, West Pomeranian Voivodeship, in northwestern Poland. It lies approximately 12 km (7 mi) north-east of Dębno, 16 km (10 mi) south of Myślibórz, and 71 km (44 mi) south of the regional capital Szczecin.

The settlement has a population of four.
