= Wyszyna, Myślibórz County =

Wyszyna
- Village
- Location within Poland
- Coordinates: 52°45′31″N 14°36′36″E
- Country: Poland
- Voivodeship: West Pomeranian
- County: Myślibórz
- Gmina: Boleszkowice

Wyszyna [vɨˈʂɨna] (German: Hochland) is a village in the administrative district of Gmina Boleszkowice, within Myślibórz County, West Pomeranian Voivodeship, in north-western Poland, close to the German border. It lies approximately 6 km (4 mi) north-east of Boleszkowice, 26 km (16 mi) south-west of Myślibórz, and 74 km (46 mi) south of the regional capital Szczecin.
