= Reinhard Treptow =

- Born: 28 November 1892; Leikow (present day Poland)
- Died: Unknown
- Military career
- Allegiance: Germany
- Branch: Luftstreitkräfte
- Rank: Offizierstellvertreter (Officer candidate)
- Units: Flieger-Abteilung (Artillerie) (Flier Detachment (Artillery)) 207, Kampfeinsitzerstaffel (Combat Single-seater Squadron) 4, Jagdstaffel (Fighter Squadron) 25
- Awards: Iron Cross, Bulgarian Order of Bravery (all four classes), Austro-Hungarian Military Merit Cross

Offizierstellvertreter Reinhard Treptow (born 28 November 1892, date of death unknown) was a World War I flying ace credited with six aerial victories.

== Biography ==
Reinhard Treptow was born in Leikow on 28 November 1892. He joined the German Army's 2nd Field Artillery Regiment on 13 October 1913, before World War I began.

He reported for aviation training in 1915, and was posted to Fliegerersatz-Abteilung (Replacement Detachment) 5 in Hannover, Germany. Training completed, he passed on to Flieger-Abteilung (Artillerie) Flier Detachment (Artillery) 207 on 25 October 1915. He flew artillery direction and reconnaissance missions there until March 1917. He was then transferred to a fighter squadron, Jagdstaffel 25, which was stationed in Macedonia.
