= Przylaszczka, West Pomeranian Voivodeship =

Przylaszczka
- Settlement
- Location within Poland
- Coordinates: 52°49′0″N 14°43′21″E
- Country: Poland
- Voivodeship: West Pomeranian
- County: Myślibórz
- Gmina: Dębno
- Population: 10

Przylaszczka [pʂɨˈlaʂt͡ʂka] (formerly German Knack) is a settlement in the administrative district of Gmina Dębno, within Myślibórz County, West Pomeranian Voivodeship, in north-western Poland. It lies approximately 10 km (6 mi) north of Dębno, 17 km (11 mi) south-west of Myślibórz, and 68 km (42 mi) south of the regional capital Szczecin.

For the history of the region, see History of Pomerania.

The settlement has a population of 10.
