= Bogusław, West Pomeranian Voivodeship =

Bogusław
- Village
- Location within Poland
- Coordinates: 52°41′12″N 14°45′42″E
- Country: Poland
- Voivodeship: West Pomeranian
- County: Myślibórz
- Gmina: Dębno
- Elevation: 56 m (184 ft)
- Population: 266

Bogusław [bɔˈɡuswaf] (formerly German Batzlow) is a village in the administrative district of Gmina Dębno, within Myślibórz County, West Pomeranian Voivodeship, in north-western Poland. It lies approximately 7 km (4 mi) south-east of Dębno, 29 km (18 mi) south of Myślibórz, and 82 km (51 mi) south of the regional capital Szczecin.

The village has a population of 266.

== See also ==
- History of Pomerania
