= Klępin =

- Village
- Location within Poland
- Coordinates: 52°46′23″N 14°42′3″E
- Country: Poland
- Voivodeship: West Pomeranian
- County: Myślibórz
- Gmina: Dębno

Klępin [ˈklɛmpin] (German: Kleppin) is a village in the administrative district of Gmina Dębno, within Myślibórz County, West Pomeranian Voivodeship, in north-western Poland. It lies approximately 5 km (3 mi) north of Dębno, 21 km (13 mi) south-west of Myślibórz, and 72 km (45 mi) south of the regional capital Szczecin.

For the history of the region, see History of Pomerania.
