= Friedrich-Karl Burckhardt =

- Born: 24 December 1889; Koslin, Prussia (now in Poland)
- Died: 18 June 1962 (aged 72)
- Military career
- Allegiance: Germany
- Branch: Luftstreitkräfte (Flying service)
- Rank: Hauptmann
- Units: Flieger-Abteilung 14; Flieger-Abteilung 30; Kampfeinsitzerstaffel 4; Jagdstaffel 25
- Commands: Jagdstaffel 25
- Awards: Prussian House Order of Hohenzollern; Prussian Iron Cross Second and First Class; Bulgarian Topferkeit

Hauptmann (Captain) Friedrich-Karl Burckhardt was a World War I flying ace credited with five aerial victories. He was a professional soldier who already held a pilot's license when World War I began. He served on the Eastern Front until 28 November 1916, when he was promoted to command Jagdstaffel 25 in Macedonia. On 25 February 1918, he was withdrawn back to Germany, where he eventually commanded a home defense squadron until war's end. He scored victories over British, Italian, and French pilots, and was one of the few German aces to serve in aviation for the entirety of World War I.

== Early life and prewar service ==
Friedrich-Karl Burckhardt was born on 24 December 1889 in Koslin, Prussia, which is now located in Poland. From 1902 to 1904, he served as a cadet. He then joined Prussian Infantry Regiment No. 54. He was already interested in aviation; he garnered Pilot's License No. 418 on 27 May 1913. He then transferred to military aviation.

== World War I service ==
As World War I began, Burckhardt was serving in Feldflieger Abteilung (Field Flier Detachment) 14 on the Eastern Front during August 1914. He was awarded the Iron Cross Second Class on 9 September 1914. He was wounded on 27 September. On 28 October 1914 he was awarded the First Class Iron Cross. He remained with Feldflieger Abteilung 14 until December 1915.

He transferred to Feldflieger Abteilung 30, serving with them until 28 November 1916. He was then appointed to command Jagdstaffel 25, a fighter squadron stationed in Macedonia. Between 15 January and 5 July 1917, he downed four enemy aircraft and an observation balloon. In August 1917, he was again decorated, this time with the Royal House Order of Hohenzollern. On 25 February 1918, he was recalled to Germany. Once there, he was appointed to lead a home defense unit, Kampfeinsitzerstaffel (Combat Single-seater Squadron) 4a.

== List of aerial victories ==
See also Aerial victory standards of World War I

No.	Date/time	Aircraft	Foe	Result	Location	Notes
1	15 January 1917		Royal Aircraft Factory B.E.2c	Destroyed	Smolari (near Lake Dorian)	Victim from No. 47 Squadron RFC
2	29 April 1917 @ 1030 hours		Maurice Farman serial number 1957	Destroyed	West of Suhodol and Rijah	Victim from Italian Squadriglia 47
3	5 May 1917 @ 1140 hours		Observation balloon	Destroyed	Ribarci	
4	31 May 1917 @ 0820 hours		Nieuport 12	Destroyed	Čanište (northeast of Monastir)	Victim from French Escadrille N.524
5	5 July 1917		Farman	Destroyed	Vicinity of Bač (northeast of Monastir)	Victim from French Escadrille 503

== Postwar ==
He died on 18 June 1962.

== Awards and honors ==
- Iron Cross of 1914
  - 2nd class: 9 September 1914
  - 1st class: 28 October 1914
- Royal House Order of Hohenzollern
- Order of Bravery (Bulgaria)
