= Ribarci =

Ribarci may refer to:

- Ribarci, Novaci, North Macedonia
- Ribarci (Bosilegrad), Serbia
