= Porzecze, Myślibórz County =

Porzecze
- Village
- Location within Poland
- Coordinates: 52°41′N 14°29′E
- Country: Poland
- Voivodeship: West Pomeranian
- County: Myślibórz
- Gmina: Boleszkowice

Porzecze [pɔˈʐɛt͡ʂɛ] (German: Hälse) is a village in the administrative district of Gmina Boleszkowice, within Myślibórz County, West Pomeranian Voivodeship, in north-western Poland, close to the German border. It lies approximately 7 km (4 mi) south-west of Boleszkowice, 38 km (24 mi) south-west of Myślibórz, and 82 km (51 mi) south of the regional capital Szczecin.

== See also ==
- History of Pomerania
