= Hajnówka, West Pomeranian Voivodeship =

Hajnówka
- Settlement
- Location within Poland
- Coordinates: 52°46′14″N 14°38′5″E
- Country: Poland
- Voivodeship: West Pomeranian
- County: Myślibórz
- Gmina: Dębno
- Population: 39

Hajnówka [xai̯ˈnufka] (German: Herrnhausen) is a settlement in the administrative district of Gmina Dębno, within Myślibórz County, West Pomeranian Voivodeship, in north-western Poland. It lies approximately 7 km (4 mi) north-west of Dębno, 24 km (15 mi) south-west of Myślibórz, and 72 km (45 mi) south of the regional capital Szczecin. The settlement has a population of 39.

== See also ==
- History of Pomerania
