= Krężelin =

- Village
- Location within Poland
- Coordinates: 52°51′0″N 14°42′0″E
- Country: Poland
- Voivodeship: West Pomeranian
- County: Myślibórz
- Gmina: Dębno
- Elevation: 61 m (200 ft)
- Population: 18

Krężelin [krɛ̃ˈʐɛlin] (German: Krummkavel) is a village in the administrative district of Gmina Dębno, within Myślibórz County, West Pomeranian Voivodeship, in north-western Poland. It lies approximately 13 km (8 mi) north of Dębno, 15 km (9 mi) south-west of Myślibórz, and 64 km (40 mi) south of the regional capital Szczecin.

For the history of the region, see History of Pomerania.

The village has a population of 18.
