= Piwnice =

Piwnice may refer to the following places in Poland:

- Piwnice, Kuyavian-Pomeranian Voivodeship
- Piwnice, Pomeranian Voivodeship
- Piwnice Wielkie
- Piwnice Astronomical Observatory
