= Chlewice, West Pomeranian Voivodeship =

Chlewice
- Village
- Location within Poland
- Coordinates: 52°39′51″N 14°30′6″E
- Country: Poland
- Voivodeship: West Pomeranian
- County: Myślibórz
- Gmina: Boleszkowice
- Elevation: 9 m (30 ft)
- Population: 77

Chlewice [xlɛˈvit͡sɛ] (German: Klewitz) is a village in the administrative district of Gmina Boleszkowice, within Myślibórz County, West Pomeranian Voivodeship, in north-western Poland, close to the German border. It lies approximately 8 km (5 mi) south-west of Boleszkowice, 39 km (24 mi) south-west of Myślibórz, and 84 km (52 mi) south of the regional capital Szczecin.

The village has a population of 77.
