= Różańsko =

- Village
- Location within Poland
- Coordinates: 52°51′N 14°47′E
- Country: Poland
- Voivodeship: West Pomeranian
- County: Myślibórz
- Gmina: Dębno
- Elevation: 49 m (161 ft)
- Population: 638

Różańsko [ruˈʐaɲskɔ] (formerly German Rosenthal) is a village in the administrative district of Gmina Dębno, within Myślibórz County, West Pomeranian Voivodeship, in north-western Poland. It lies approximately 15 km (9 mi) north-east of Dębno, 11 km (7 mi) south-west of Myślibórz, and 65 km (40 mi) south of the regional capital Szczecin.

The village has a population of 638.
