= Dargomyśl, Myślibórz County =

Dargomyśl
- Village
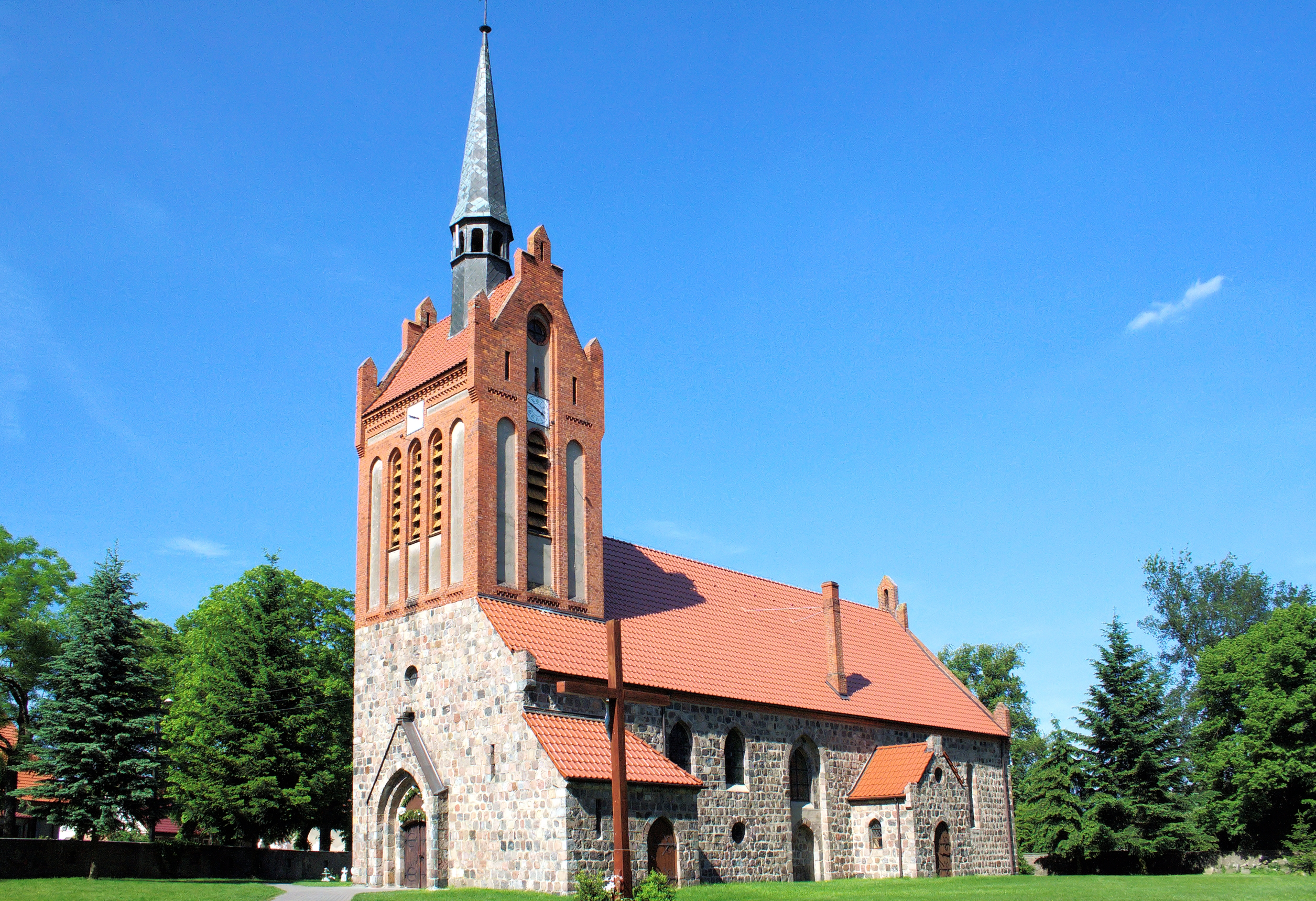
- Our Lady of Perpetual Help church

- Location within Poland
- Coordinates: 52°43′0″N 14°39′0″E
- Country: Poland
- Voivodeship: West Pomeranian
- County: Myślibórz
- Gmina: Dębno
- Elevation: 32 m (105 ft)
- Population: 604

Dargomyśl [darˈɡɔmɨɕl] (German: Darmietzel) is a village in the administrative district of Gmina Dębno, within Myślibórz County, West Pomeranian Voivodeship, in north-western Poland. It lies approximately 4 km (2 mi) south-west of Dębno, 29 km (18 mi) south-west of Myślibórz, and 78 km (48 mi) south of the regional capital Szczecin.

The village has a population of 604.
