= Piołunek =

- Settlement
- Location within Poland
- Coordinates: 52°50′47″N 14°46′8″E
- Country: Poland
- Voivodeship: West Pomeranian
- County: Myślibórz
- Gmina: Dębno
- Elevation: 56 m (184 ft)
- Population: 8

Piołunek [pjɔˈwunɛk] (German: Rosenthaler Feld) is a settlement in the administrative district of Gmina Dębno, within Myślibórz County, West Pomeranian Voivodeship, in north-western Poland. It lies approximately 14 km (9 mi) north of Dębno, 12 km (7 mi) south-west of Myślibórz, and 65 km (40 mi) south of the regional capital Szczecin.

For the history of the region, see History of Pomerania.

The settlement has a population of 8.
