= Grzymiradz =

- Village
- Location within Poland
- Coordinates: 52°47′14″N 14°41′30″E
- Country: Poland
- Voivodeship: West Pomeranian
- County: Myślibórz
- Gmina: Dębno
- Population: 223

Grzymiradz [ɡʐɨˈmirat͡s] (formerly German Grünrade) is a village in the administrative district of Gmina Dębno, within Myślibórz County, West Pomeranian Voivodeship, in north-western Poland. It lies approximately 7 km (4 mi) north of Dębno, 21 km (13 mi) south-west of Myślibórz, and 71 km (44 mi) south of the regional capital Szczecin.

The village has a population of 223.
