= Borówno, West Pomeranian Voivodeship =

Borówno
- Settlement
- Location within Poland
- Coordinates: 52°48′37″N 14°43′57″E
- Country: Poland
- Voivodeship: West Pomeranian
- County: Myślibórz
- Gmina: Dębno
- Elevation: 64 m (210 ft)
- Population: 13

Borówno [bɔˈruvnɔ] (German: Wilhelminenwalde) is a settlement in the administrative district of Gmina Dębno, within Myślibórz County, West Pomeranian Voivodeship, in north-western Poland. It lies approximately 9 km (6 mi) north of Dębno, 17 km (11 mi) south-west of Myślibórz, and 69 km (43 mi) south of the regional capital Szczecin.

The settlement has a population of 13.
