= Dolsk, West Pomeranian Voivodeship =

Dolsk
- Village
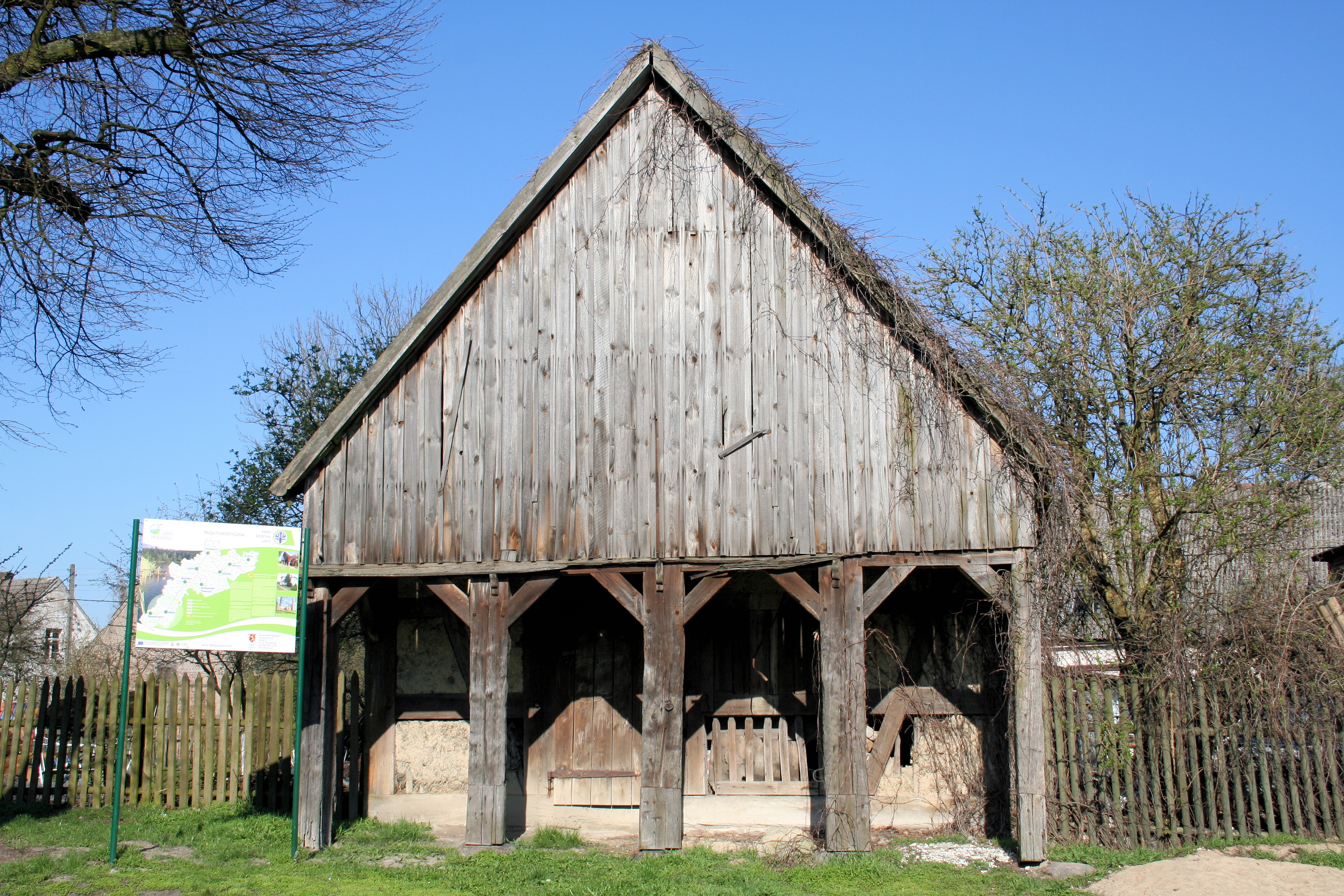
- Old wooden forge in Dolsk

- Location within Poland
- Coordinates: 52°48′26″N 14°50′22″E
- Country: Poland
- Voivodeship: West Pomeranian
- County: Myślibórz
- Gmina: Dębno
- Elevation: 49 m (161 ft)
- Population: 213
- Time zone: UTC+1 (CET)
  - Summer (DST): UTC+2 (CEST)
- Vehicle registration: ZMY

Dolsk [dɔlsk] is a village in the administrative district of Gmina Dębno, within Myślibórz County, West Pomeranian Voivodeship, in north-western Poland. It lies approximately 13 km (8 mi) north-east of Dębno, 15 km (9 mi) south of Myślibórz, and 70 km (43 mi) south of the regional capital Szczecin.

It is located in the historic region of Pomerania.

The village has a population of 213.

== Literature ==
- Mudzo, Friedrich (2022). Dölzig/Dolsk (Schlösser und Gärten der Neumark). hendrik Bäßler verlag · berlin. ISBN 978-3-910447-08-0
