= Choszczówko =

- Settlement
- Location within Poland
- Coordinates: 52°47′21″N 14°40′49″E
- Country: Poland
- Voivodeship: West Pomeranian
- County: Myślibórz
- Gmina: Dębno
- Population: 55

Choszczówko [xɔʂˈt͡ʂufkɔ] (German: Neu Grünrade) is a settlement in the administrative district of Gmina Dębno, within Myślibórz County, West Pomeranian Voivodeship, in north-western Poland. It lies approximately 7 km (4 mi) north of Dębno, 21 km (13 mi) south-west of Myślibórz, and 70 km (43 mi) south of the regional capital Szczecin.

The settlement has a population of 55.
