= Maria Magdalena Jahn =

German religious of the Sisters of Saint Elizabeth (1916–1945)

Blessed Maria Magdalena Jahn CSSE
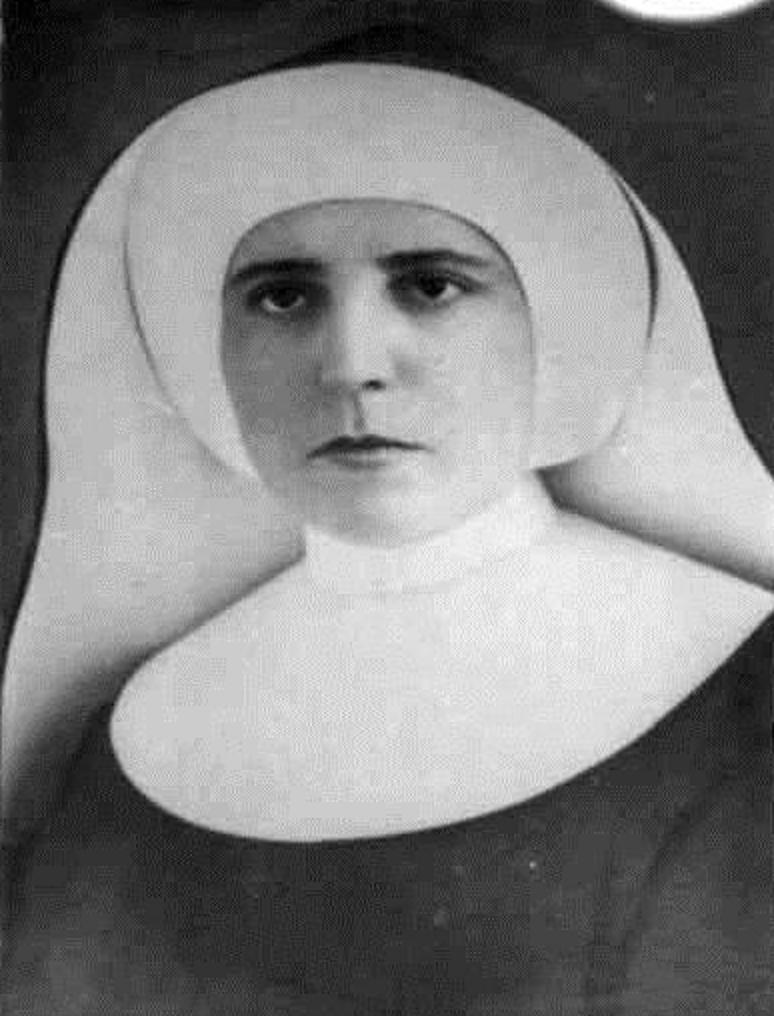
- Photo c. 1935

Martyr
- Born: 7 April 1916; Nysa, German Empire
- Died: 11 May 1945 (aged 29); Sobotín, Czechoslovakia
- Venerated in: Roman Catholic Church
- Beatified: 11 June 2022, Cathedral of Święty Jan Chrzciciel, Wrocław, Poland by Cardinal Marcello Semeraro
- Feast: 11 May

Maria Magdalena Jahn, religious name Maria Paschalis, (7 April 1916 – 11 May 1945) was a German religious of the Sisters of Saint Elizabeth. Jahn worked in several cities as a nurse for the children and the aged before she was transferred in 1942 where she would cook and assist the elder sisters. But the rise in violence towards the end of World War II saw her relocated to seek refuge in Czechoslovakia where a Russian soldier killed her in mid-1945 when she refused his advances.

== Life ==
Maria Magdalena Jahn was born on 7 April 1916 in Neiße as the first of four children born to Karol Edward Jahn and Berta Klein; she was baptized on 10 April in the Saint John the Baptist and Saint Nicholas parish church in her hometown. Jahn attended school from 1922 until 1930 and in 1930 made her First Communion. From 1930 untl 1933, she studied and worked at a private fruit processing plant in her hometown. But the financial strain on their household saw them leave their town and in late 1934 relocated to Herne in Westphalia. It was there that she worked at an apprentice house in Wuppertal-Barmen and joined them in a Marian organization. Jahn returned to her hometown sometime in 1935 and started to look after people with special needs, including an infirm old woman with a blind sister. Jahn was beatified on 11 June 2022 in Wrocław alongside nine other slain nuns.

Feeling called to the consecrated life, on 30 March 1937, she entered the Sisters of Saint Elizabeth and her twelve-month novitiate period started on 3 October 1938 before she made her initial religious profession on 19 October 1939 with the religious name of "Maria Paschalis". Jahn was first sent to Kreuzburg O.S. and Leobshütz from 1939 until 13 April 1942 as a nurse to care for the children and the aged. In 1942, she was transferred to Neiße at Saint Elizabeth's House where she would start to cook and care for the older nuns.

Upon the entrance of the Soviet armed forces into the town on 22 March 1945, she listened to her superior and left to take refuge with her peer, Fides Gemeinhardt, in a parish schoolhouse in Sobotín in the Czechoslovakia after a brief visit to Lesiny Wielkie. Jahn was well aware of the violence that the soldiers had perpetrated in the surrounding area and knew about their crimes which ranged from theft to rape; she was aware of the dangers that she could face but still decided to remain close with the people she swore to serve. To that end, Jahn continued to tend to the aged and the sick who were unable to leave the area. That May saw Soviet troops enter the town and, on the order of the parish priest, both sisters joined other refugees to hide in farm buildings to avoid the anti-religious soldiers. However, a Russian soldier shot Jahn dead with a shot to the heart on 11 May 1945 when she continued to refuse his unwanted advances. Jahn had been captured around noon, not noticing a soldier entering the house that she was living in. Running to the first floor, he cornered her and dragged her out amongst the others that had been captured, and started to molest her, however, she knelt down and held her rosary and cross and refused to indulge his requests. Jahn defied the soldier and said: "I wear a holy dress and I will never go with you". When the soldier further threatened to shoot her if she did not comply with his demands, she continued, pointing at her cross: "I belong to Christ, He is my bridegroom, you can shoot me". Following her death, the locals in Czechoslovakia began to refer to Jahn as "the white rose from Bohemia".

== Beatification ==
The beatification process opened on 28 June 2011- The diocesan process concluded on 26 September 2015 in Wrocław Cathedral. Pope Francis signed a decree on 19 June 2021 that determined that the ten slain nuns had been killed in odium fidei ("in hatred of the faith"). The beatification took place in Wrocław on 11 June 2022.

The postulator for this cause is Sr. Maria Paula Zaborowska C.S.S.E.
