= Dyszno =

- Village
- Location within Poland
- Coordinates: 52°49′18″N 14°43′49″E
- Country: Poland
- Voivodeship: West Pomeranian
- County: Myślibórz
- Gmina: Dębno
- Elevation: 53 m (174 ft)
- Population: 213

Dyszno [ˈdɨʂnɔ] (German: Ringenwalde) is a village in the administrative district of Gmina Dębno, within Myślibórz County, West Pomeranian Voivodeship, in north-western Poland. It lies approximately 11 km (7 mi) north of Dębno, 16 km (10 mi) south-west of Myślibórz, and 67 km (42 mi) south of the regional capital Szczecin.

The village has a population of 213.
