= Wierutno =

- Village
- Location within Poland
- Coordinates: 52°44′N 14°32′E
- Country: Poland
- Voivodeship: West Pomeranian
- County: Myślibórz
- Gmina: Boleszkowice

Wierutno [vjɛˈrutnɔ] (German: Vierruthen) is a village in the administrative district of Gmina Boleszkowice, within Myślibórz County, West Pomeranian Voivodeship, in north-western Poland, close to the German border. It lies approximately 3 km (2 mi) north-west of Boleszkowice, 32 km (20 mi) south-west of Myślibórz, and 76 km (47 mi) south of the regional capital Szczecin.
