= Ostrowiec, Myślibórz County =

Ostrowiec
- Village
- Location within Poland
- Coordinates: 52°49′0″N 14°47′10″E
- Country: Poland
- Voivodeship: West Pomeranian
- County: Myślibórz
- Gmina: Dębno
- Elevation: 49 m (161 ft)
- Population: 157

Ostrowiec [ɔsˈtrɔvjɛt͡s] (German: Wusterwitz) is a village in the administrative district of Gmina Dębno, within Myślibórz County, West Pomeranian Voivodeship, in north-western Poland. It lies approximately 11 km (7 mi) north-east of Dębno, 15 km (9 mi) south-west of Myślibórz, and 68 km (42 mi) south of the regional capital Szczecin.

For the history of the region, see History of Pomerania.

The village has a population of 157.
