= Turze, Myślibórz County =

Turze
- Settlement
- Location within Poland
- Coordinates: 52°48′46″N 14°49′23″E
- Country: Poland
- Voivodeship: West Pomeranian
- County: Myślibórz
- Gmina: Dębno
- Population: 29

Turze [ˈtuʐɛ] (formerly German: Thur) is a settlement in the administrative district of Gmina Dębno, within Myślibórz County, West Pomeranian Voivodeship, in north-western Poland. It lies approximately 13 km (8 mi) north-east of Dębno, 14 km (9 mi) south of Myślibórz, and 69 km (43 mi) south of the regional capital Szczecin.

The settlement has a population of 29.

== See also ==
History of Pomerania
