= Radzicz, West Pomeranian Voivodeship =

Radzicz
- Settlement
- Location within Poland
- Coordinates: 52°51′28″N 14°44′12″E
- Country: Poland
- Voivodeship: West Pomeranian
- County: Myślibórz
- Gmina: Dębno
- Population: 8
- Time zone: UTC+1 (CET)
  - Summer (DST): UTC+2 (CEST)
- Vehicle registration: ZMY

Radzicz [ˈrad͡ʑit͡ʂ] (German: Ruhleben) is a settlement in the administrative district of Gmina Dębno, within Myślibórz County, West Pomeranian Voivodeship, in north-western Poland. It lies approximately 15 km (9 mi) north of Dębno, 13 km (8 mi) south-west of Myślibórz, and 63 km (39 mi) south of the regional capital Szczecin.

The settlement has a population of 8.

== History ==
The area became part of the emerging Polish state in the 10th century. Following Poland's fragmentation, it formed part of the Duchy of Greater Poland. Later on, it was also ruled by Brandenburg, Bohemia (Czechia), the Teutonic Order, Prussia and Germany. Following Germany's defeat in World War II in 1945, the area became again part of Poland.
