= Barzyna =

Barzyna refers to the following places in Poland:

- Barzyna, Opole Voivodeship
- Barzyna, Warmian-Masurian Voivodeship
