= Sulisław, West Pomeranian Voivodeship =

Sulisław
- Village
- Location within Poland
- Coordinates: 52°49′47″N 14°48′44″E
- Country: Poland
- Voivodeship: West Pomeranian
- County: Myślibórz
- Gmina: Dębno
- Population: 29

Sulisław [suˈliswaf] (German: Neu Rosenthal) is a village in the administrative district of Gmina Dębno, within Myślibórz County, West Pomeranian Voivodeship, in north-western Poland. It lies approximately 14 km (9 mi) north-east of Dębno, 13 km (8 mi) south of Myślibórz, and 67 km (42 mi) south of the regional capital Szczecin.

The village has a population of 29.
