= Warnice, Myślibórz County =

Warnice
- Village
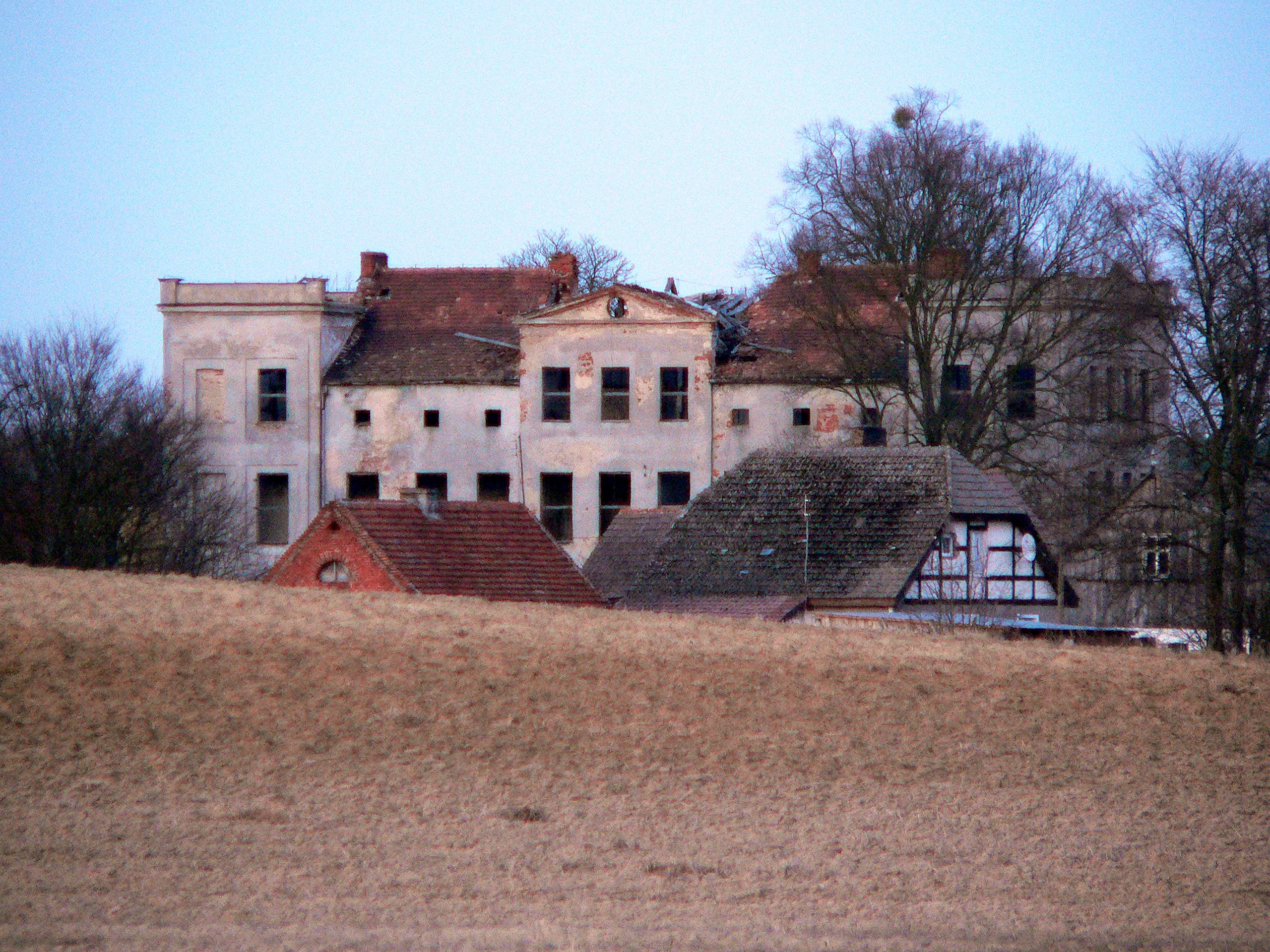
- Ruins of the Warnice Palace

- Location within Poland
- Coordinates: 52°51′0″N 14°40′0″E
- Country: Poland
- Voivodeship: West Pomeranian
- County: Myślibórz
- Gmina: Dębno
- Elevation: 58 m (190 ft)
- Population: 360
- Time zone: UTC+1 (CET)
  - Summer (DST): UTC+2 (CEST)
- Vehicle registration: ZMY

Warnice [varˈnit͡sɛ] is a village in the administrative district of Gmina Dębno, within Myślibórz County, West Pomeranian Voivodeship, in north-western Poland. It lies approximately 14 km (9 mi) north of Dębno, 17 km (11 mi) south-west of Myślibórz, and 64 km (40 mi) south of the regional capital Szczecin.

The village has a population of 360.
