= Łazy, Myślibórz County =

Łazy
- Settlement
- Location within Poland
- Coordinates: 52°45′16″N 14°45′17″E
- Country: Poland
- Voivodeship: West Pomeranian
- County: Myślibórz
- Gmina: Dębno
- Elevation: 45 m (148 ft)
- Population: 33
- Time zone: UTC+1 (CET)
  - Summer (DST): UTC+2 (CEST)

Łazy [ˈwazɨ] (formerly German Kolonie Loose) is a settlement in the administrative district of Gmina Dębno, within Myślibórz County, West Pomeranian Voivodeship, in north-western Poland. It lies approximately 5 km (3 mi) north-east of Dębno, 22 km (14 mi) south of Myślibórz, and 75 km (47 mi) south of the regional capital Szczecin.

The settlement has a population of 33.
