= Juncewo, West Pomeranian Voivodeship =

Juncewo
- Settlement
- Location within Poland
- Coordinates: 52°52′0″N 14°44′48″E
- Country: Poland
- Voivodeship: West Pomeranian
- County: Myślibórz
- Gmina: Dębno
- Population: 18

Juncewo [junˈt͡sɛvɔ] (formerly German Hagen) is a settlement in the administrative district of Gmina Dębno, within Myślibórz County, West Pomeranian Voivodeship, in north-western Poland. It lies approximately 16 km (10 mi) north of Dębno, 11 km (7 mi) south-west of Myślibórz, and 62 km (39 mi) south of the regional capital Szczecin.

For the history of the region, see History of Pomerania.

The settlement has a population of 18.
