= Ciemna Dąbrowa =

- Village
- Location within Poland
- Coordinates: 53°29′N 21°2′E
- Country: Poland
- Voivodeship: Warmian-Masurian
- County: Szczytno
- Gmina: Wielbark

Ciemna Dąbrowa [ˈt͡ɕɛmna dɔmˈbrɔva] (German: Finsterdamerau) is a village in the administrative district of Gmina Wielbark, within Szczytno County, Warmian-Masurian Voivodeship, in northern Poland.
