= Liszki, Warmian-Masurian Voivodeship =

Liszki
- Village
- Location within Poland
- Coordinates: 53°59′18″N 19°34′50″E
- Country: Poland
- Voivodeship: Warmian-Masurian
- County: Elbląg
- Gmina: Rychliki
- Population: 30

Liszki [ˈliʂki] is a village in the administrative district of Gmina Rychliki, within Elbląg County, Warmian-Masurian Voivodeship, in northern Poland.
