= Jagdstaffel 25 =

Jasta 25
- Active: 1916–1918
- Country: German Empire
- Branch: Luftstreitkräfte
- Type: Fighter squadron
- Engagements: World War I • Macedonian front

Royal Prussian Jagdstaffel 25, commonly abbreviated as Jasta 25, was a "hunting group" (fighter squadron) of the Luftstreitkräfte, the air arm of the Imperial German Army during World War I. The squadron would score 54 aerial victories during the War – 46 enemy aircraft and eight opposing observation balloons. It would suffer two pilots killed in action, one pilot killed in a flying accident, and two others injured in mishaps.

== History ==
Jasta 25 was founded on 28 November 1916, and mobilized on 1 December. It began operations in Macedonia, using Halberstadt D.IIs. It scored its first success on 10 December 1916, and took its first casualty on 18 February 1917. It continued operations until the end of the war brought about the dissolution of the Luftstreitkräfte.

== Commanding officers (Staffelführer) ==
1. Friedrich-Karl Burckhardt: 2 December 1916 – 1 February 1918
2. August Rose: 1 February 1918 – 11 November 1918

== Duty stations ==
1. Prilep: 28 November 1916 – 13 March 1917
2. Kanatlarci: 13 March 1917 – 1 June 1918
3. Kalkova: 1 June 1918 – 11 November 1918

== Notable personnel ==
A quartet of decorated flying aces served with the unit. They were:

- Gerhard Fieseler, winner of the Military Merit Cross and Iron Cross
- Reinhard Treptow, Iron Cross
- Otto Brauneck, Iron Cross
- Friedrich-Karl Burckhardt, Iron Cross

== Aircraft and operations ==
- Halberstadt D.II
- Albatros D.III
- Roland D.IIa
