= Wysoka, West Pomeranian Voivodeship =

Wysoka
- Village
- Location within Poland
- Coordinates: 52°44′30″N 14°36′34″E
- Country: Poland
- Voivodeship: West Pomeranian
- County: Myślibórz
- Gmina: Boleszkowice
- Elevation: 58 m (190 ft)
- Population: 297

Wysoka [vɨˈsɔka] (German: Wittstock) is a village in the administrative district of Gmina Boleszkowice, within Myślibórz County, West Pomeranian Voivodeship, in north-western Poland, close to the German border. It lies approximately 5 km (3 mi) north-east of Boleszkowice, 28 km (17 mi) south-west of Myślibórz, and 75 km (47 mi) south of the regional capital Szczecin.

The village has a population of 297.
