= Kaleńsko =

- Village
- Location within Poland
- Coordinates: 52°38′14″N 14°32′43″E
- Country: Poland
- Voivodeship: West Pomeranian
- County: Myślibórz
- Gmina: Boleszkowice
- Population: 46

Kaleńsko [kaˈlɛɲskɔ] (German: Kalenzig) is a village in the administrative district of Gmina Boleszkowice, and is located within Myślibórz County, West Pomeranian Voivodeship, in north-western Poland, close to the German border. It lies approximately 9 km (6 mi) south of Boleszkowice, 40 km (25 mi) south-west of Myślibórz, and 87 km (54 mi) south of the regional capital Szczecin.

The village has a population of 46.
