= Lesiny Małe =

- Village
- Location within Poland
- Coordinates: 53°24′N 21°8′E
- Country: Poland
- Voivodeship: Warmian-Masurian
- County: Szczytno
- Gmina: Wielbark

Lesiny Małe [lɛˈɕinɨ ˈmawɛ] (German: Klein Leschienen) is a village in the administrative district of Gmina Wielbark, within Szczytno County, Warmian-Masurian Voivodeship, in northern Poland.
