= Dziśnity, Elbląg County =

Dziśnity
- Village
- Location within Poland
- Coordinates: 53°56′58″N 19°34′23″E
- Country: Poland
- Voivodeship: Warmian-Masurian
- County: Elbląg
- Gmina: Rychliki
- Population: 70

Dziśnity [d͡ʑiɕˈnitɨ] is a village in the administrative district of Gmina Rychliki, within Elbląg County, Warmian-Masurian Voivodeship, in northern Poland.
