= Wopity =

- Village
- Location within Poland
- Coordinates: 53°57′29″N 19°29′27″E
- Country: Poland
- Voivodeship: Warmian-Masurian
- County: Elbląg
- Gmina: Rychliki
- Population: 30

Wopity [vɔˈpitɨ] is a village in the administrative district of Gmina Rychliki, within Elbląg County, Warmian-Masurian Voivodeship, in northern Poland.
