= Nowojowiec =

- Village
- Location within Poland
- Coordinates: 53°26′N 21°1′E
- Country: Poland
- Voivodeship: Warmian-Masurian
- County: Szczytno
- Gmina: Wielbark

Nowojowiec [nɔvɔˈjɔvjɛt͡s] (German: Nowojowitz, 1934-45: Neuenwalde) is a village in the administrative district of Gmina Wielbark, within Szczytno County, Warmian-Masurian Voivodeship, in northern Poland.
