= Kucbork =

- Village
- Location within Poland
- Coordinates: 53°26′N 20°55′E
- Country: Poland
- Voivodeship: Warmian-Masurian
- County: Szczytno
- Gmina: Wielbark
- Population: 280

Kucbork [ˈkut͡sbɔrk] (German: Kutzburg) is a village in the administrative district of Gmina Wielbark, within Szczytno County, Warmian-Masurian Voivodeship, in northern Poland.

The village has a population of 280.
