= Świdy, Warmian-Masurian Voivodeship =

Świdy
- Settlement
- Location within Poland
- Coordinates: 53°57′51″N 19°22′53″E
- Country: Poland
- Voivodeship: Warmian-Masurian
- County: Elbląg
- Gmina: Rychliki

Świdy [ˈɕfidɨ] is a settlement in the administrative district of Gmina Rychliki, within Elbląg County, Warmian-Masurian Voivodeship, in northern Poland.
