= Kipary =

- Village
- Location within Poland
- Coordinates: 53°22′N 21°4′E
- Country: Poland
- Voivodeship: Warmian-Masurian
- County: Szczytno
- Gmina: Wielbark

Kipary [kiˈparɨ] (German: Kiparen, 1938-45: Wacholderau) is a village in the administrative district of Gmina Wielbark, within Szczytno County, Warmian-Masurian Voivodeship, in northern Poland.
