= Zieleniec Mały =

- Village
- Location within Poland
- Coordinates: 53°26′59″N 21°5′27″E
- Country: Poland
- Voivodeship: Warmian-Masurian
- County: Szczytno
- Gmina: Wielbark
- Population: 30

Zieleniec Mały [ʑɛˈlɛɲɛt͡s ˈmawɨ] (German: Klein Radzienen; 1938-1945: Klein Hügelwalde) is a village in the administrative district of Gmina Wielbark, within Szczytno County, Warmian-Masurian Voivodeship, in northern Poland.

The village has a population of 30.
