= Oborzany =

- Village
- Location within Poland
- Coordinates: 52°44′17″N 14°39′57″E
- Country: Poland
- Voivodeship: West Pomeranian
- County: Myślibórz
- Gmina: Dębno
- Elevation: 38 m (125 ft)
- Population: 518

Oborzany [ɔbɔˈʐanɨ] (formerly German Nabern) is a village in the administrative district of Gmina Dębno, within Myślibórz County, West Pomeranian Voivodeship, in north-western Poland. It lies approximately 3 km (2 mi) west of Dębno, 26 km (16 mi) south-west of Myślibórz, and 76 km (47 mi) south of the regional capital Szczecin.

For the history of the region, see History of Pomerania.

The village has a population of 518.
