= Powodowo, Warmian-Masurian Voivodeship =

Powodowo
- Village
- Location within Poland
- Coordinates: 54°0′5″N 19°27′43″E
- Country: Poland
- Voivodeship: Warmian-Masurian
- County: Elbląg
- Gmina: Rychliki
- Population: 200

Powodowo [pɔvɔˈdɔvɔ] is a village in the administrative district of Gmina Rychliki, within Elbląg County, Warmian-Masurian Voivodeship, in northern Poland.
