= Zieleniec, Warmian-Masurian Voivodeship =

Zieleniec
- Village
- Location within Poland
- Coordinates: 53°26′N 21°7′E
- Country: Poland
- Voivodeship: Warmian-Masurian
- County: Szczytno
- Gmina: Wielbark

Zieleniec [ʑɛˈlɛɲɛt͡s] is a village in the administrative district of Gmina Wielbark, within Szczytno County, Warmian-Masurian Voivodeship, in northern Poland.
