= Barnówko-Mostno-Buszewo oil field =

Oil field in Poland

- Location within Poland
- Country: Poland
- Region: West Pomeranian Voivodeship
- Location: Gmina Dębno
- Offshore/onshore: Onshore
- Coordinates: 52°46′12″N 14°47′09″E
- Operator: PGNiG

Field history
- Discovery: 1993
- Start of production: 1994

Production
- Estimated oil in place: 12 million tonnes (~ 10×10^{6} m^{3} or 90 million bbl)
- Estimated gas in place: 9.9×10^{9} m^{3} 350×10^{9} cu ft

Barnówko-Mostno-Buszewo oil field is a Polish oil field that was discovered in 1993. It is one of the biggest on-shore oil fields in Poland. It began production in 1994 and produces oil. Its oil proven reserves are about 90 million barrels (14×10^{6} m^{3}) and natural gas proven reserves are around 350 billion cubic feet (9.9 billion m^{3}).
