= Marwica, Warmian-Masurian Voivodeship =

Marwica
- Village
- Location within Poland
- Coordinates: 54°1′32″N 19°32′38″E
- Country: Poland
- Voivodeship: Warmian-Masurian
- County: Elbląg
- Gmina: Rychliki
- Population: 240

Marwica [marˈvit͡sa] is a village in the administrative district of Gmina Rychliki, within Elbląg County, Warmian-Masurian Voivodeship, in northern Poland.
