= Gmina Wielbark =

Gmina Wielbark Wielbark Commune
- Gmina
- Flag Coat of arms
- Interactive map of Gmina Wielbark
- Coordinates (Wielbark): 53°23′52″N 20°56′46″E
- Country: Poland
- Voivodeship: Warmian-Masurian
- County: Szczytno
- Seat: Wielbark

Area
  - Total: 347.89 km^{2} (134.32 sq mi)

Population (2006)
  - Total: 6,257
  - Density: 17.99/km^{2} (46.58/sq mi)
- Website: https://wielbark.com.pl/

Gmina Wielbark is an urban-rural gmina (administrative district) in Szczytno County, Warmian-Masurian Voivodeship, in northern Poland. Its seat is the village of Wielbark, which lies approximately 19 kilometres (12 mi) south of Szczytno and 52 km (32 mi) south-east of the regional capital Olsztyn.

The gmina covers an area of 347.89 square kilometres (134.3 sq mi), and as of 2006 its total population is 6,257.

== Villages ==
Gmina Wielbark contains the villages and settlements of Baranowo, Borki Wielbarskie, Ciemna Dąbrowa, Dąbrowa, Głuch, Jakubowy Borek, Jankowo, Jesionowiec, Kipary, Kołodziejowy Grąd, Kucbork, Łatana Mała, Łatana Wielka, Lejkowo, Lesiny Małe, Lesiny Wielkie, Łysak, Maliniak, Nowojowiec, Olędry, Ostrowy, Piwnice Wielkie, Przeździęk Mały, Przeździęk Wielki, Róklas, Sędrowo, Stachy, Szymanki, Wesołówko, Wesołowo, Wielbark, Wyżegi, Zabiele, Zapadki, Zieleniec and Zieleniec Mały.

== Neighbouring gminas ==
Gmina Wielbark is bordered by the gminas of Chorzele, Czarnia, Janowo, Jedwabno, Rozogi and Szczytno.
