= Antoni Dobrowolski =

Polish educator and Holocaust survivor (1904–2012)

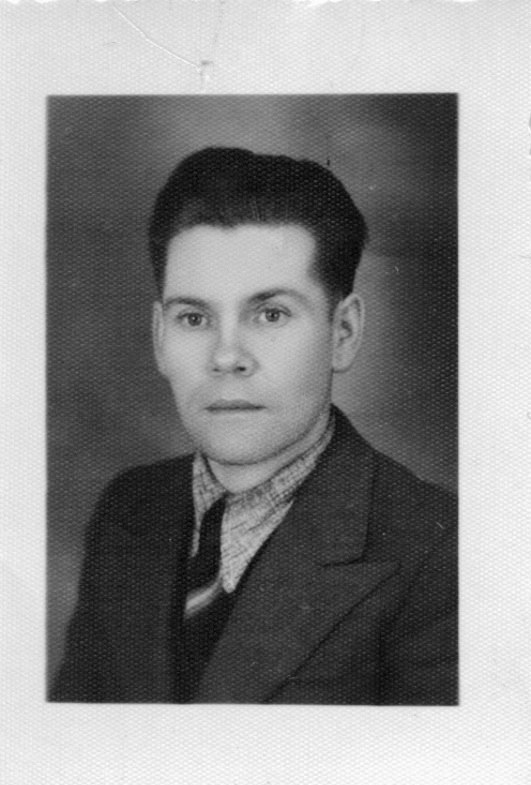
- An early photo of Dobrowolski
- Born: 8 October 1904; Wolbórz, Congress Poland, Russian Empire
- Died: 21 October 2012 (aged 108); Dębno, Poland
- Occupations: Educator; teacher

Antoni Dobrowolski (8 October 1904 – 21 October 2012) was a Polish educator, teacher and Holocaust survivor. At the time of his death in 2012, Dobrowolski was the oldest known survivor of the Auschwitz concentration camp.

Dobrowolski was born in Wolbórz, present-day Poland, on 8 October 1904.

Nazi German authorities limited the education of ethnic Polish children to only four years during the occupation of Poland in order to undermine Polish culture. Despite the ban, Dobrowolski joined the Secret Teaching Organization to provide underground education in occupied Poland, according to Auschwitz historian Adam Cyra. Dobrowolski was discovered and arrested in June 1942 by the Gestapo. He was sent to the Auschwitz concentration camp, where he was assigned the prisoner number 38081. Dobrowolski later recalled that "Auschwitz was worse than Dante's hell." He was transferred to the Gross-Rosen concentration camp and Sachsenhausen concentration camp, remaining a prisoner until his release in 1945.

He moved to Dębno, Poland, following the end of World War II following his liberation. He worked as an elementary school teacher, before becoming the director of a high school.

Dorbrowolski died on 21 October 2012, in Dębno, Poland, at the age of 108. He was the oldest known survivor of Auschwitz at the time.

== See also ==
- Nazi crimes against ethnic Poles
