= Rejsyty =

- Village
- Location within Poland
- Coordinates: 53°57′27″N 19°30′2″E
- Country: Poland
- Voivodeship: Warmian-Masurian
- County: Elbląg
- Gmina: Rychliki
- Population: 293

Rejsyty [rɛi̯ˈsɨtɨ] is a village in the administrative district of Gmina Rychliki, within Elbląg County, Warmian-Masurian Voivodeship, in northern Poland.
