= Marwica Wielka =

- Village
- Location within Poland
- Coordinates: 54°0′26″N 19°32′38″E
- Country: Poland
- Voivodeship: Warmian-Masurian
- County: Elbląg
- Gmina: Rychliki

Marwica Wielka [marˈvit͡sa ˈvjɛlka] is a village in the administrative district of Gmina Rychliki, within Elbląg County, Warmian-Masurian Voivodeship, in northern Poland.
