= Rychliki =

- Village
- Location within Poland
- Coordinates: 53°59′6″N 19°31′41″E
- Country: Poland
- Voivodeship: Warmian-Masurian
- County: Elbląg
- Gmina: Rychliki
- Population: 805

Rychliki [rɨˈxliki] is a village in Elbląg County, Warmian-Masurian Voivodeship, in northern Poland. It is the seat of the gmina (administrative district) called Gmina Rychliki.
