= Gmina Boleszkowice =

Gmina Boleszkowice Boleszkowice Commune
- Gmina
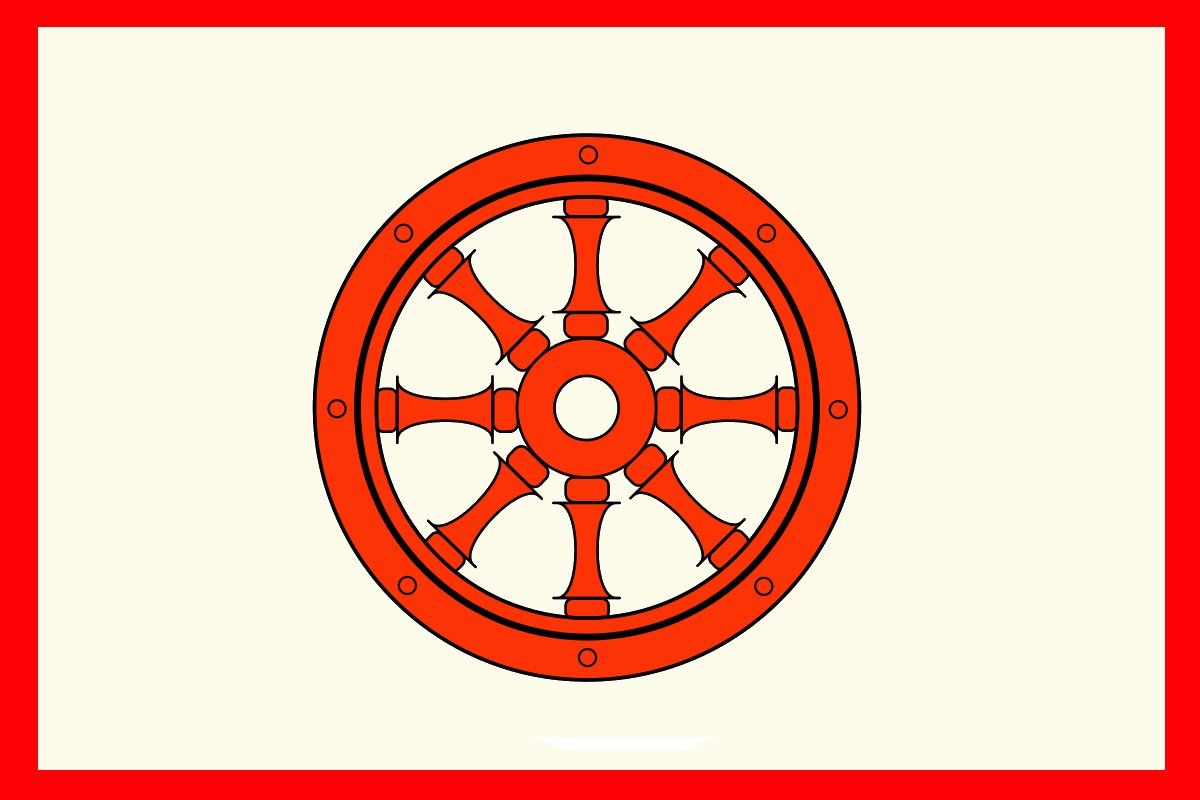
- Flag Coat of arms
- Interactive map of Gmina Boleszkowice
- Coordinates (Boleszkowice): 52°43′N 14°34′E
- Country: Poland
- Voivodeship: West Pomeranian
- County: Myślibórz
- Seat: Boleszkowice

Area
  - Total: 129.92 km^{2} (50.16 sq mi)

Population (2006)
  - Total: 2,899
  - Density: 22.31/km^{2} (57.79/sq mi)
- Website: http://www.boleszkowice.pl/

Gmina Boleszkowice is a rural gmina (administrative district) in Myślibórz County, West Pomeranian Voivodeship, in north-western Poland, on the German border. Its seat is the village of Boleszkowice, which lies approximately 32 kilometres (20 mi) south-west of Myślibórz and 78 km (48 mi) south of the regional capital Szczecin.

The gmina had a population of 2,899 as of 2006, spread over an area of 129.92 square kilometres (50.2 sq mi).

As of 2016, the population is 2,902.

The gmina contains part of the protected area called Ujście Warty Landscape Park.

== Villages ==
Gmina Boleszkowice contains the villages and settlements of Boleszkowice, Chlewice, Chwarszczany, Gudzisz, Kaleńsko, Namyślin, Porzecze, Reczyce, Wielopole, Wierutno, Wysoka and Wyszyna.

== Neighbouring gminas ==
Gmina Boleszkowice is bordered by the town of Kostrzyn nad Odrą and the gminas of Dębno and Mieszkowice. It also borders Germany.
