= Dymnik, Warmian-Masurian Voivodeship =

Dymnik
- Village
- Location within Poland
- Coordinates: 53°58′35″N 19°28′58″E
- Country: Poland
- Voivodeship: Warmian-Masurian
- County: Elbląg
- Gmina: Rychliki
- Elevation: 20 m (66 ft)
- Population: 115

Dymnik [ˈdɨmnik] is a village in the administrative district of Gmina Rychliki, within Elbląg County, Warmian-Masurian Voivodeship, in northern Poland.
