= Budki, Warmian-Masurian Voivodeship =

Budki
- Village
- Location within Poland
- Coordinates: 54°00′30″N 19°34′50″E
- Country: Poland
- Voivodeship: Warmian-Masurian
- County: Elbląg
- Gmina: Rychliki

Budki (Polish pronunciation: [ˈbutki]) is a village in the administrative district of Gmina Rychliki, within Elbląg County, Warmian-Masurian Voivodeship, in northern Poland.
