= Gudzisz =

- Village
- Location within Poland
- Coordinates: 52°40′40″N 14°36′59″E
- Country: Poland
- Voivodeship: West Pomeranian
- County: Myślibórz
- Gmina: Boleszkowice
- Elevation: 48 m (157 ft)
- Population: 277

Gudzisz [ˈɡud͡ʑiʂ] (German: Kutzdorf) is a village in the administrative district of Gmina Boleszkowice, within Myślibórz County, West Pomeranian Voivodeship, in north-western Poland, close to the German border. It lies approximately 6 km (4 mi) south-east of Boleszkowice, 33 km (21 mi) south-west of Myślibórz, and 83 km (52 mi) south of the regional capital Szczecin.

The village has a population of 277.
