= Jelonki, Warmian-Masurian Voivodeship =

Jelonki
- Village
- Location within Poland
- Coordinates: 54°1′55″N 19°33′28″E
- Country: Poland
- Voivodeship: Warmian-Masurian
- County: Elbląg
- Gmina: Rychliki
- Population: 693

Jelonki [jɛˈlɔnki] is a village in the administrative district of Gmina Rychliki, within Elbląg County, Warmian-Masurian Voivodeship, in northern Poland.
