= Wesołowo, Szczytno County =

Wesołowo
- Village
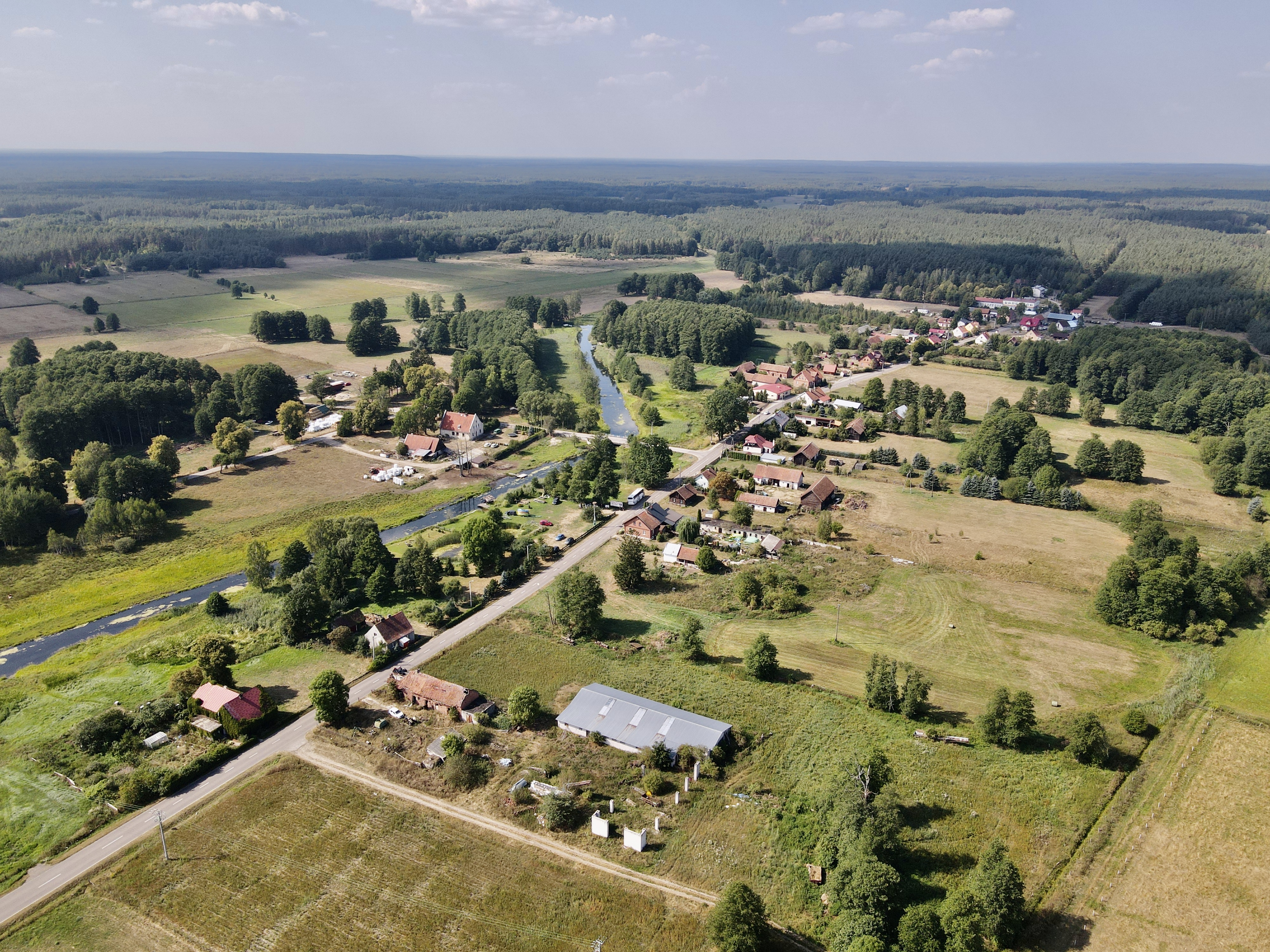

- Location within Poland
- Coordinates: 53°26′25″N 20°51′23″E
- Country: Poland
- Voivodeship: Warmian-Masurian
- County: Szczytno
- Gmina: Wielbark
- Time zone: UTC+1 (CET)
  - Summer (DST): UTC+2 (CEST)
- Vehicle registration: NSZ

Wesołowo [vɛsɔˈwɔvɔ] is a village in the administrative district of Gmina Wielbark, within Szczytno County, Warmian-Masurian Voivodeship, in northern Poland. It is located in the historic region of Masuria.
