= Grądowy Młyn =

- Settlement
- Location within Poland
- Coordinates: 54°0′36″N 19°28′31″E
- Country: Poland
- Voivodeship: Warmian-Masurian
- County: Elbląg
- Gmina: Rychliki
- Population: 2

Grądowy Młyn [ɡrɔnˈdɔvɨ ˈmwɨn] is a settlement in the administrative district of Gmina Rychliki, within Elbląg County, Warmian-Masurian Voivodeship, in northern Poland.
