= Gmina Dębno, West Pomeranian Voivodeship =

Gmina Dębno Dębno Commune
- Gmina
- Flag Coat of arms
- Interactive map of Gmina Dębno
- Coordinates (Dębno): 52°44′N 14°42′E
- Country: Poland
- Voivodeship: West Pomeranian
- County: Myślibórz
- Seat: Dębno

Area
  - Total: 318.78 km^{2} (123.08 sq mi)

Population (2006)
  - Total: 20,805
  - Density: 65.264/km^{2} (169.03/sq mi)
  - Urban: 13,903
  - Rural: 6,902
- Website: http://www.debno.com.pl/

Gmina Dębno is an urban-rural gmina (administrative district) in Myślibórz County, West Pomeranian Voivodeship, in north-western Poland. Its seat is the town of Dębno, which lies approximately 25 kilometres (16 mi) south-west of Myślibórz and 77 km (48 mi) south of the regional capital Szczecin.

The gmina covers an area of 318.78 square kilometres (123.1 sq mi), and as of 2006 its total population is 20,805 (out of which the population of Dębno amounts to 13,903, and the population of the rural part of the gmina is 6,902). The Barnówko-Mostno-Buszewo oil field is located in the gmina.

== Villages ==
Apart from the town of Dębno, Gmina Dębno contains the villages and settlements of Barnówko, Bogusław, Borne, Borówno, Choszczówko, Cychry, Dargomyśl, Dolsk, Dyszno, Grzybno, Grzymiradz, Hajnówka, Juncewo, Klępin, Krężelin, Krześnica, Łazy, Młyniska, Mostno, Oborzany, Ostrowiec, Piołunek, Przylaszczka, Radzicz, Różańsko, Sarbinowo, Smolnica, Suchlica, Sulisław, Turze, Warnice and Więcław.

== Neighbouring gminas ==
Gmina Dębno is bordered by the town of Kostrzyn nad Odrą and the gminas of Boleszkowice, Lubiszyn, Mieszkowice, Myślibórz and Trzcińsko-Zdrój.
