= Zabiele, Warmian-Masurian Voivodeship =

Zabiele
- Village
- Location within Poland
- Coordinates: 53°27′N 21°2′E
- Country: Poland
- Voivodeship: Warmian-Masurian
- County: Szczytno
- Gmina: Wielbark

Zabiele [zaˈbjɛlɛ] is a village in the administrative district of Gmina Wielbark, within Szczytno County, Warmian-Masurian Voivodeship, in northern Poland.
