= Gmina Rychliki =

Gmina Rychliki Rychliki Commune
- Gmina
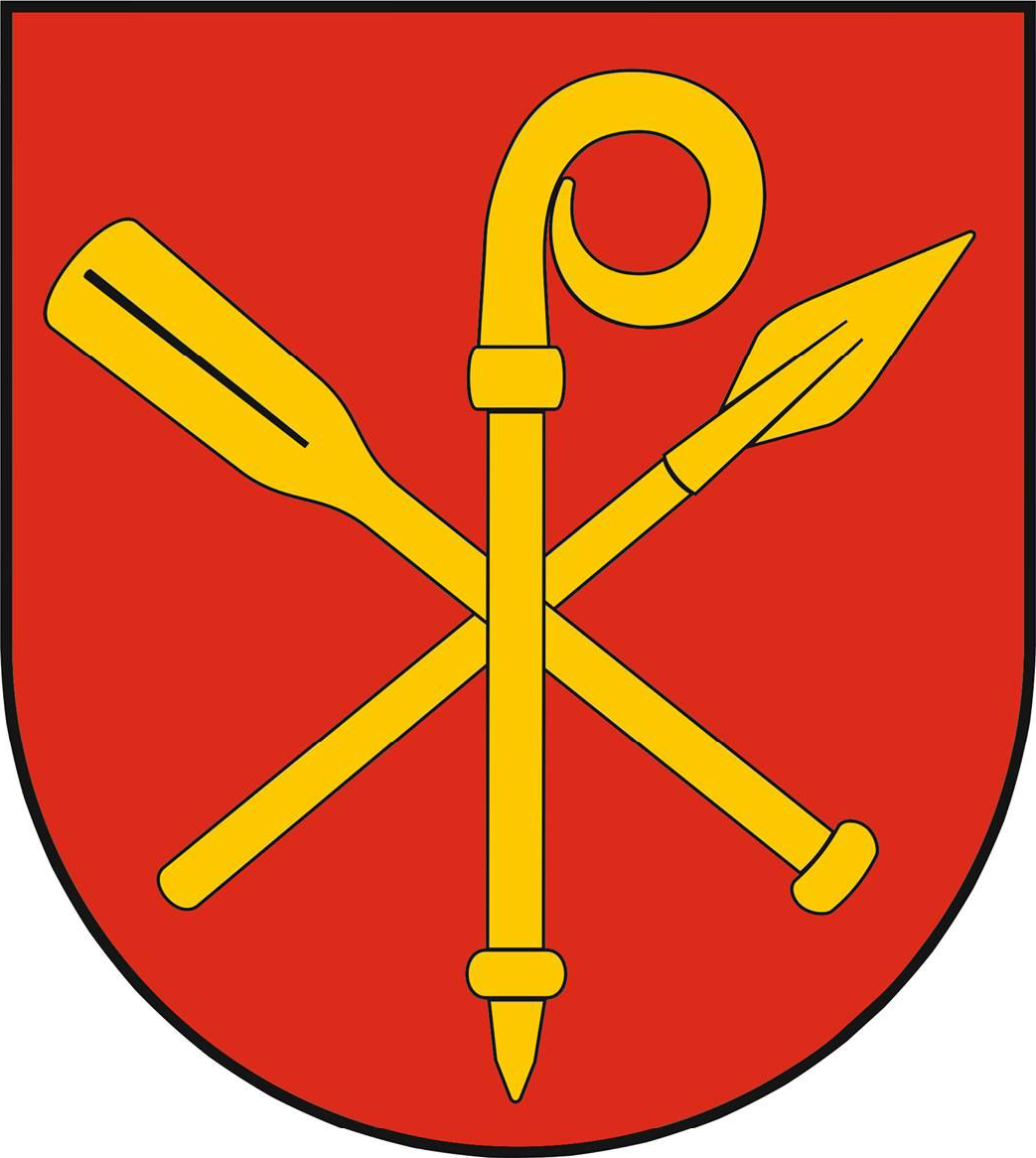
- Coat of arms
- Interactive map of Gmina Rychliki
- Coordinates (Rychliki): 53°59′6″N 19°31′41″E
- Country: Poland
- Voivodeship: Warmian-Masurian
- County: Elbląg County
- Seat: Rychliki

Area
  - Total: 131.66 km^{2} (50.83 sq mi)

Population (2006)
  - Total: 4,087
  - Density: 31.04/km^{2} (80.40/sq mi)
- Time zone: UTC+1 (CET)
  - Summer (DST): UTC+2 (CEST)
- Vehicle registration: NEB
- Website: http://rychliki.org/

Gmina Rychliki is a rural gmina (administrative district) in Elbląg County, Warmian-Masurian Voivodeship, in northern Poland. Its seat is the village of Rychliki, which lies approximately 15 kilometres (9 mi) south-east of Elbląg and 68 km (42 mi) west of the regional capital Olsztyn.

The gmina covers an area of 131.66 square kilometres (50.8 sq mi), and as of 2006 its total population is 4,087.

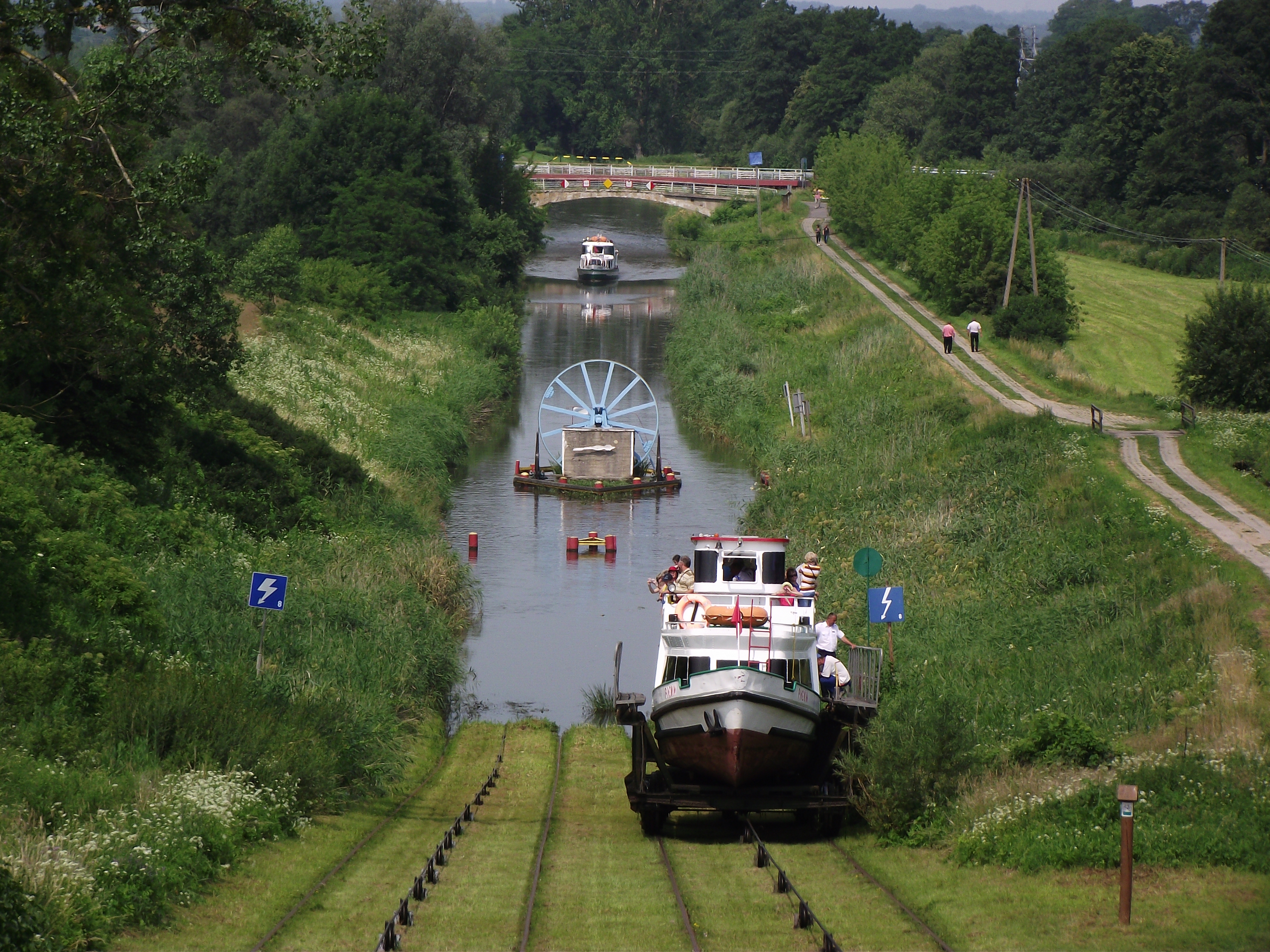
Boat lift of the Elbląg Canal in Buczyniec

== Villages ==
Gmina Rychliki contains the villages and settlements of Barzyna, Buczyniec, Budki, Dymnik, Dziśnity, Gołutowo, Grądowy Młyn, Jankowo, Jelonki, Kiersity, Krupin, Kwietniewo, Lepno, Liszki, Marwica, Marwica Wielka, Mokajmy, Powodowo, Protowo, Rejsyty, Rychliki, Śliwice, Sójki, Świdy, Święty Gaj, Topolno Wielkie, Wopity and Wysoka.

== Neighbouring gminas ==
Gmina Rychliki is bordered by the gminas of Dzierzgoń, Elbląg, Małdyty, Markusy, Pasłęk and Stary Dzierzgoń.
