= Borki Wielbarskie =

- Village
- Location within Poland
- Coordinates: 53°23′58″N 21°01′36″E
- Country: Poland
- Voivodeship: Warmian-Masurian
- County: Szczytno
- Gmina: Wielbark
- Population (approx.): 70

Borki Wielbarskie [ˈbɔrki vjɛlˈbarskʲɛ] (German: Borken bei Willenberg) is a village in the administrative district of Gmina Wielbark, within Szczytno County, Warmian-Masurian Voivodeship, in northern Poland. The village has an approximate population of 70.
