= Wyżegi =

- Village
- Location within Poland
- Coordinates: 53°19′N 20°53′E
- Country: Poland
- Voivodeship: Warmian-Masurian
- County: Szczytno
- Gmina: Wielbark

Wyżegi [vɨˈʐɛɡi] (German: Wyseggen, 1938–45: Grünlanden) is a village in the administrative district of Gmina Wielbark, within Szczytno County, Warmian-Masurian Voivodeship, in northern Poland.
