= Krupin, Elbląg County =

Krupin
- Village
- Location within Poland
- Coordinates: 53°56′53″N 19°26′43″E
- Country: Poland
- Voivodeship: Warmian-Masurian
- County: Elbląg
- Gmina: Rychliki

Krupin [ˈkrupin] is a village that is located in the administrative district of Gmina Rychliki, within Elbląg County, Warmian-Masurian Voivodeship, in northern Poland.
