= Reczyce, West Pomeranian Voivodeship =

Reczyce
- Village
- Location within Poland
- Coordinates: 52°40′40″N 14°35′44″E
- Country: Poland
- Voivodeship: West Pomeranian
- County: Myślibórz
- Gmina: Boleszkowice

Reczyce [rɛˈt͡ʂɨt͡sɛ] (German: Kutzdorfer Eisenhammer) is a village in the administrative district of Gmina Boleszkowice, within Myślibórz County, West Pomeranian Voivodeship, in north-western Poland, close to the German border.
