= Olędry =

- Village
- Location within Poland
- Coordinates: 53°22′44″N 21°4′40″E
- Country: Poland
- Voivodeship: Warmian-Masurian
- County: Szczytno
- Gmina: Wielbark

Olędry [ɔˈlɛndrɨ] (German: Wagenfeld) is a village in the administrative district of Gmina Wielbark, within Szczytno County, Warmian-Masurian Voivodeship, in northern Poland.
