= Cychry, West Pomeranian Voivodeship =

Cychry
- Village
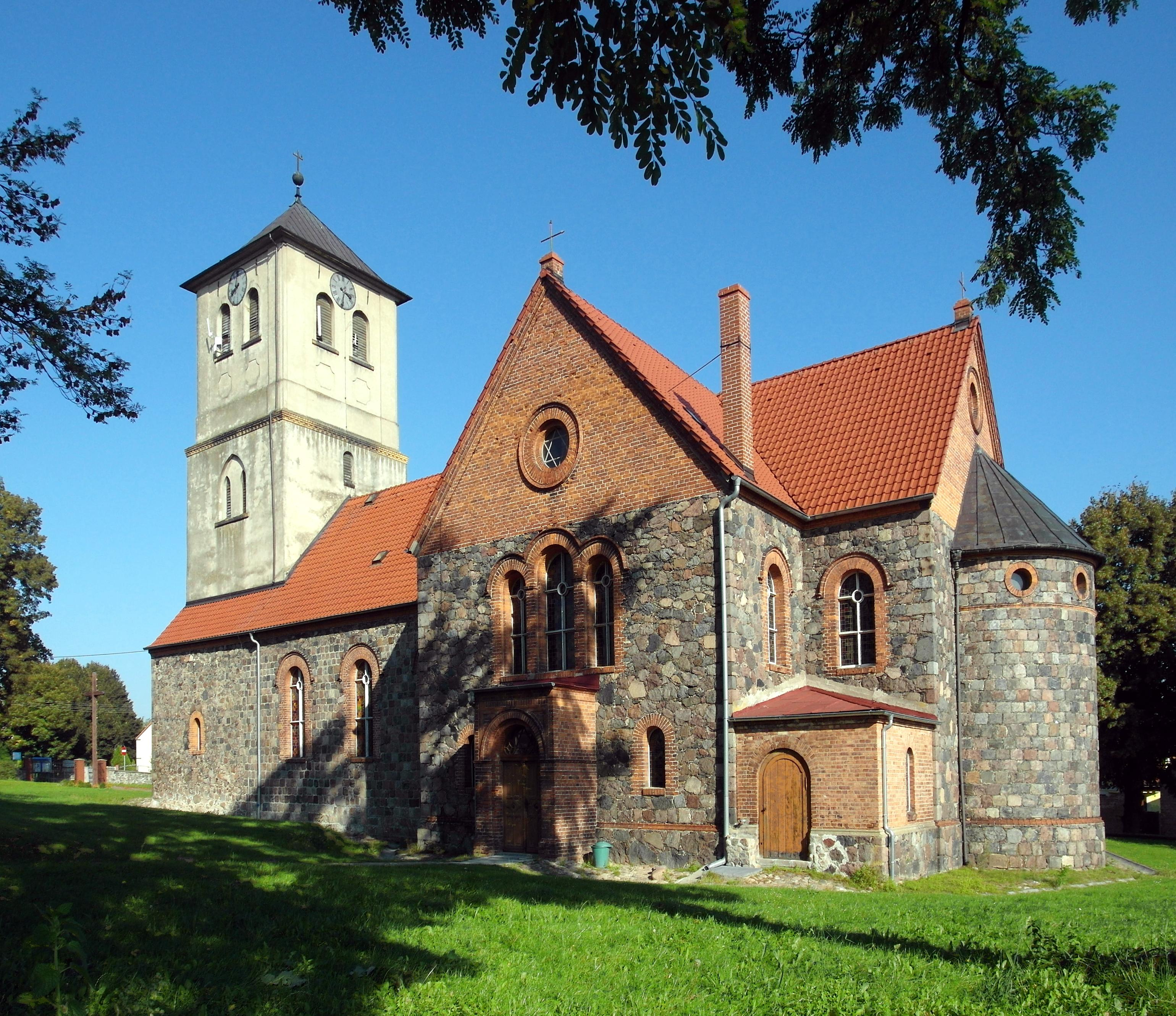
- Saint Stanislaus church in Cychry

- Location within Poland
- Coordinates: 52°41′0″N 14°42′0″E
- Country: Poland
- Voivodeship: West Pomeranian
- County: Myślibórz
- Gmina: Dębno
- Elevation: 40 m (130 ft)

Population
  - Total: 991
- Time zone: UTC+1 (CET)
  - Summer (DST): UTC+2 (CEST)
- Vehicle registration: ZMY

Cychry [ˈt͡sɨxrɨ] (German: Zicher) is a village in the administrative district of Gmina Dębno, within Myślibórz County, West Pomeranian Voivodeship, in western Poland. It lies approximately 6 km (4 mi) south of Dębno, 30 km (19 mi) south of Myślibórz, and 82 km (51 mi) south of the regional capital Szczecin.

The village has a population of 991.

During World War II, the German administration operated two forced labour subcamps of the Stalag III-C prisoner-of-war camp in the village.
