= Stachy, Poland =

Stachy
- Village
- Location within Poland
- Coordinates: 53°25′N 21°0′E
- Country: Poland
- Voivodeship: Warmian-Masurian
- County: Szczytno
- Gmina: Wielbark

Stachy [ˈstaxɨ] (German: Waldpusch) is a village in the administrative district of Gmina Wielbark, within Szczytno County, Warmian-Masurian Voivodeship, in northern Poland.
