= Sójki, Warmian-Masurian Voivodeship =

Sójki
- Village
- Location within Poland
- Coordinates: 53°56′19″N 19°24′46″E
- Country: Poland
- Voivodeship: Warmian-Masurian
- County: Elbląg
- Gmina: Rychliki

Sójki [ˈsui̯ki] is a village in the administrative district of Gmina Rychliki, within Elbląg County, Warmian-Masurian Voivodeship, in northern Poland.
