= Dąbrowa, Gmina Wielbark =

Dąbrowa
- Village
- Location within Poland
- Coordinates: 53°21′10″N 20°48′44″E
- Country: Poland
- Voivodeship: Warmian-Masurian
- County: Szczytno
- Gmina: Wielbark

Dąbrowa [dɔmˈbrɔva] is a village in the administrative district of Gmina Wielbark, within Szczytno County, Warmian-Masurian Voivodeship, in northern Poland.
