= Buczyniec =

- Village
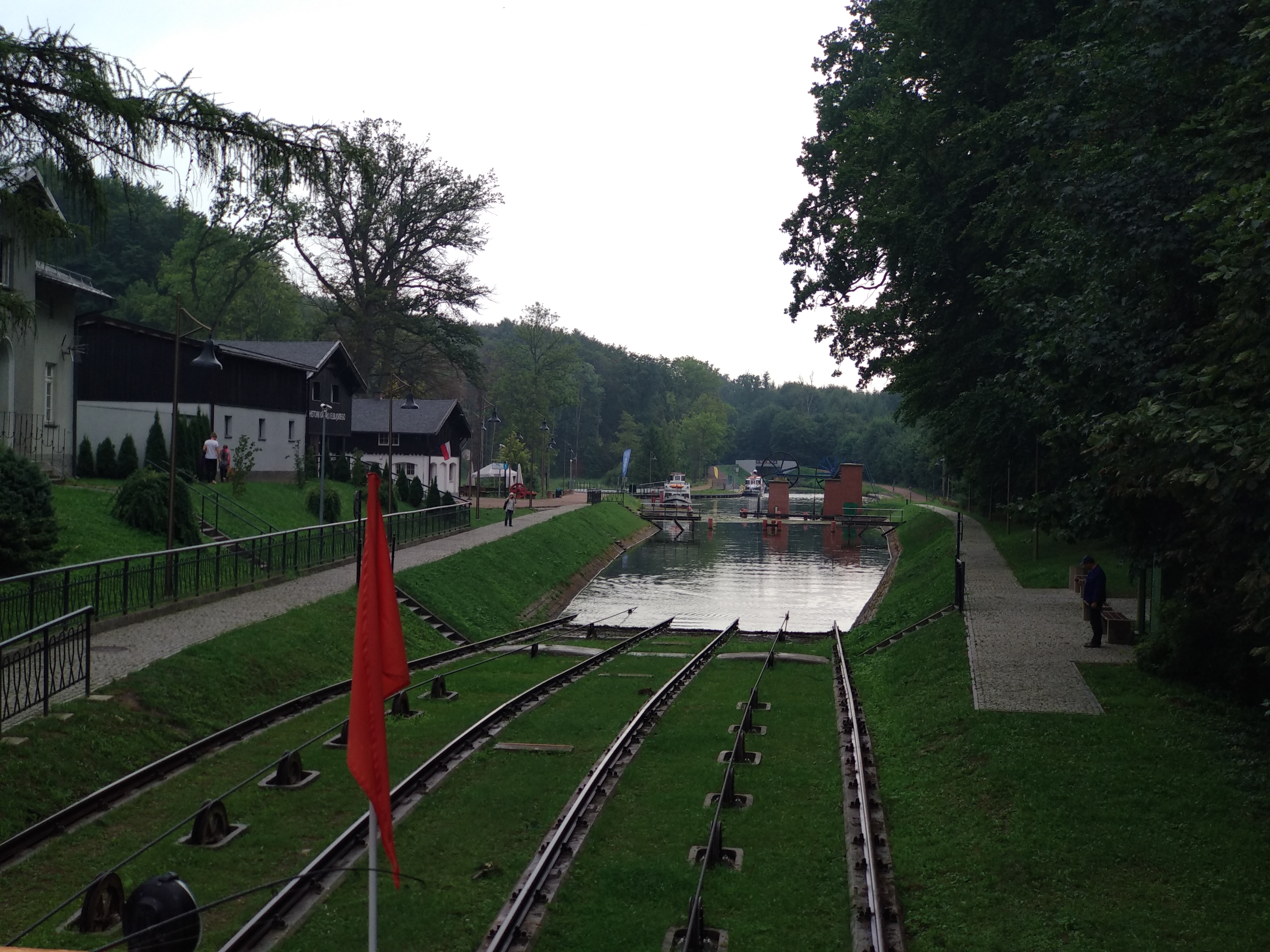
- The inclined plane in the Elbląg Canal which goes through the village.

- Location within Poland
- Coordinates: 53°58′11″N 19°35′5″E
- Country: Poland
- Voivodeship: Warmian-Masurian
- County: Elbląg
- Gmina: Rychliki
- Population: 90

Buczyniec [buˈt͡ʂɨɲɛt͡s] is a village in the administrative district of Gmina Rychliki, within Elbląg County, Warmian-Masurian Voivodeship, in northern Poland.
