= Zapadki =

- Village
- Location within Poland
- Coordinates: 53°22′N 21°8′E
- Country: Poland
- Voivodeship: Warmian-Masurian
- County: Szczytno
- Gmina: Wielbark

Zapadki [zaˈpatki] (German: Schrötersau) is a village in the administrative district of Gmina Wielbark, within Szczytno County, Warmian-Masurian Voivodeship, in northern Poland.
