= Sędrowo =

- Village
- Location within Poland
- Coordinates: 53°22′N 21°0′E
- Country: Poland
- Voivodeship: Warmian-Masurian
- County: Szczytno
- Gmina: Wielbark

Sędrowo [sɛnˈdrɔvɔ] (German: Sendrowen, 1938-45: Treudorf) is a village in the administrative district of Gmina Wielbark, within Szczytno County, Warmian-Masurian Voivodeship, in northern Poland.

== History ==
Sędrowo was founded by Albert, Duke of Prussia, in 1556 when an estate was granted to Martin Follert von Schlangenberg for services rendered to the Duke.
