= Namyślin =

- Village
- Location within Poland
- Coordinates: 52°40′22″N 14°32′25″E
- Country: Poland
- Voivodeship: West Pomeranian
- County: Myślibórz
- Gmina: Boleszkowice
- Elevation: 17 m (56 ft)
- Population: 298

Namyślin [naˈmɨɕlin] (German: Neumühl) is a village in the administrative district of Gmina Boleszkowice, within Myślibórz County, West Pomeranian Voivodeship, in north-western Poland, close to the German border. It lies approximately 6 km (4 mi) south of Boleszkowice, 37 km (23 mi) south-west of Myślibórz, and 83 km (52 mi) south of the regional capital Szczecin.

The village has a population of 298.

== Notable residents ==
- Georg von Bismarck (1891–1942), Wehrmacht general
