= Lysak (surname) =

Lysak is a surname. Notable people include:

- Anhelina Lysak (born 1998), Ukrainian-Polish wrestler
- Brett Lysak (born 1980), Canadian ice hockey player
- John Lysak (1914–2020), American canoeist
- Steven Lysak (1912–2002), American canoeist
