= Wysoka, Elbląg County =

Wysoka
- Village
- Location within Poland
- Coordinates: 54°1′N 19°30′E
- Country: Poland
- Voivodeship: Warmian-Masurian
- County: Elbląg
- Gmina: Rychliki

Wysoka [vɨˈsɔka] is a village in the administrative district of Gmina Rychliki, within Elbląg County, Warmian-Masurian Voivodeship, in northern Poland.
