= Przeździęk Mały =

- Village
- Location within Poland
- Coordinates: 53°22′N 20°48′E
- Country: Poland
- Voivodeship: Warmian-Masurian
- County: Szczytno
- Gmina: Wielbark

Przeździęk Mały (Polish pronunciation: [ˈpʂɛʑdʑɛŋk ˈmawɨ]; German: Klein Przesdenk) is a village in the administrative district of Gmina Wielbark, within Szczytno County, Warmian-Masurian Voivodeship, in northern Poland.
