= Jankowo, Elbląg County =

Jankowo
- Village
- Location within Poland
- Coordinates: 53°57′N 19°24′E
- Country: Poland
- Voivodeship: Warmian-Masurian
- County: Elbląg
- Gmina: Rychliki
- Population: 150

Jankowo [janˈkɔvɔ] is a village in the administrative district of Gmina Rychliki, within Elbląg County and Warmian-Masurian Voivodeship, in northern Poland.
