= Przeździęk Wielki =

- Village
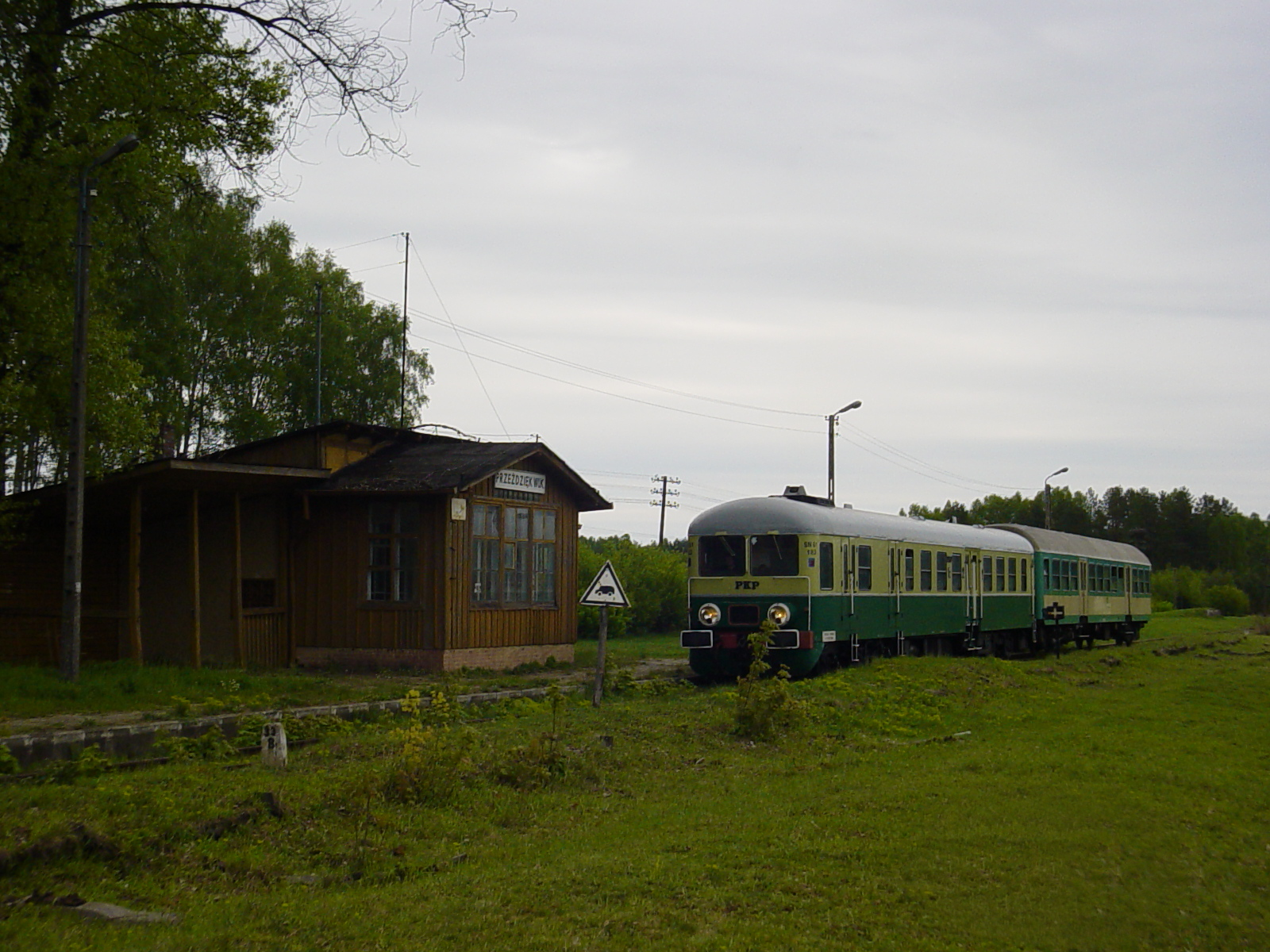
- Train stop in Przeździęk Wielki (2003)

- Location within Poland
- Coordinates: 53°22′N 20°52′E
- Country: Poland
- Voivodeship: Warmian-Masurian
- County: Szczytno
- Gmina: Wielbark

Przeździęk Wielki (Polish pronunciation: [ˈpʂɛʑdʑɛŋk ˈfjɛlkʲi]; German: Groß Przesdzienk) is a village in the administrative district of Gmina Wielbark, within Szczytno County, Warmian-Masurian Voivodeship, in northern Poland.

On the outskirts of the village there is a former Evangelical cemetery with a section from World War I, in which six soldiers of the Russian army are buried. Another war cemetery is located behind the railway station, in the forest, and contains graves from World War I with twenty-four soldiers of the Russian army and four soldiers of the German army.

The village was founded in 1685. A brick school was built in the village in 1902.
