= Śliwice, Warmian-Masurian Voivodeship =

Śliwice
- Village
- Location within Poland
- Coordinates: 53°59′59″N 19°35′33″E
- Country: Poland
- Voivodeship: Warmian-Masurian
- County: Elbląg
- Gmina: Rychliki

Śliwice [ɕliˈvit͡sɛ] is a village in the administrative district of Gmina Rychliki, within Elbląg County, Warmian-Masurian Voivodeship, in northern Poland.
