= Łysak, Warmian-Masurian Voivodeship =

Łysak
- Village
- Location within Poland
- Coordinates: 53°25′52″N 21°03′32″E
- Country: Poland
- Voivodeship: Warmian-Masurian
- County: Szczytno
- Gmina: Wielbark

Łysak [ˈwɨsak] (German: Lysack) is a village in the administrative district of Gmina Wielbark, within Szczytno County, Warmian-Masurian Voivodeship, in northern Poland.
