= Piwnice Wielkie =

- Village
- Location within Poland
- Coordinates: 53°21′N 20°55′E
- Country: Poland
- Voivodeship: Warmian-Masurian
- County: Szczytno
- Gmina: Wielbark

Piwnice Wielkie [pivˈnit͡sɛ ˈvjɛlkʲɛ] (German: Groß Piwnitz) is a village in the administrative district of Gmina Wielbark, within Szczytno County, Warmian-Masurian Voivodeship, in northern Poland.
