= Barzyna, Warmian-Masurian Voivodeship =

Barzyna
- Village
- Location within Poland
- Coordinates: 53°59′N 19°34′E
- Country: Poland
- Voivodeship: Warmian-Masurian
- County: Elbląg
- Gmina: Rychliki

Barzyna [baˈʐɨna] is a village in the administrative district of Gmina Rychliki, within Elbląg County, Warmian-Masurian Voivodeship, in northern Poland.
