= Łatana Wielka =

- Village
- Location within Poland
- Coordinates: 53°23′N 21°5′E
- Country: Poland
- Voivodeship: Warmian-Masurian
- County: Szczytno
- Gmina: Wielbark

Łatana Wielka [waˈtana ˈvjɛlka] (German: Groß Lattana) is a village in the administrative district of Gmina Wielbark, within Szczytno County, Warmian-Masurian Voivodeship, in northern Poland.
