= Boleszkowice, Myślibórz County =

Boleszkowice
- Village
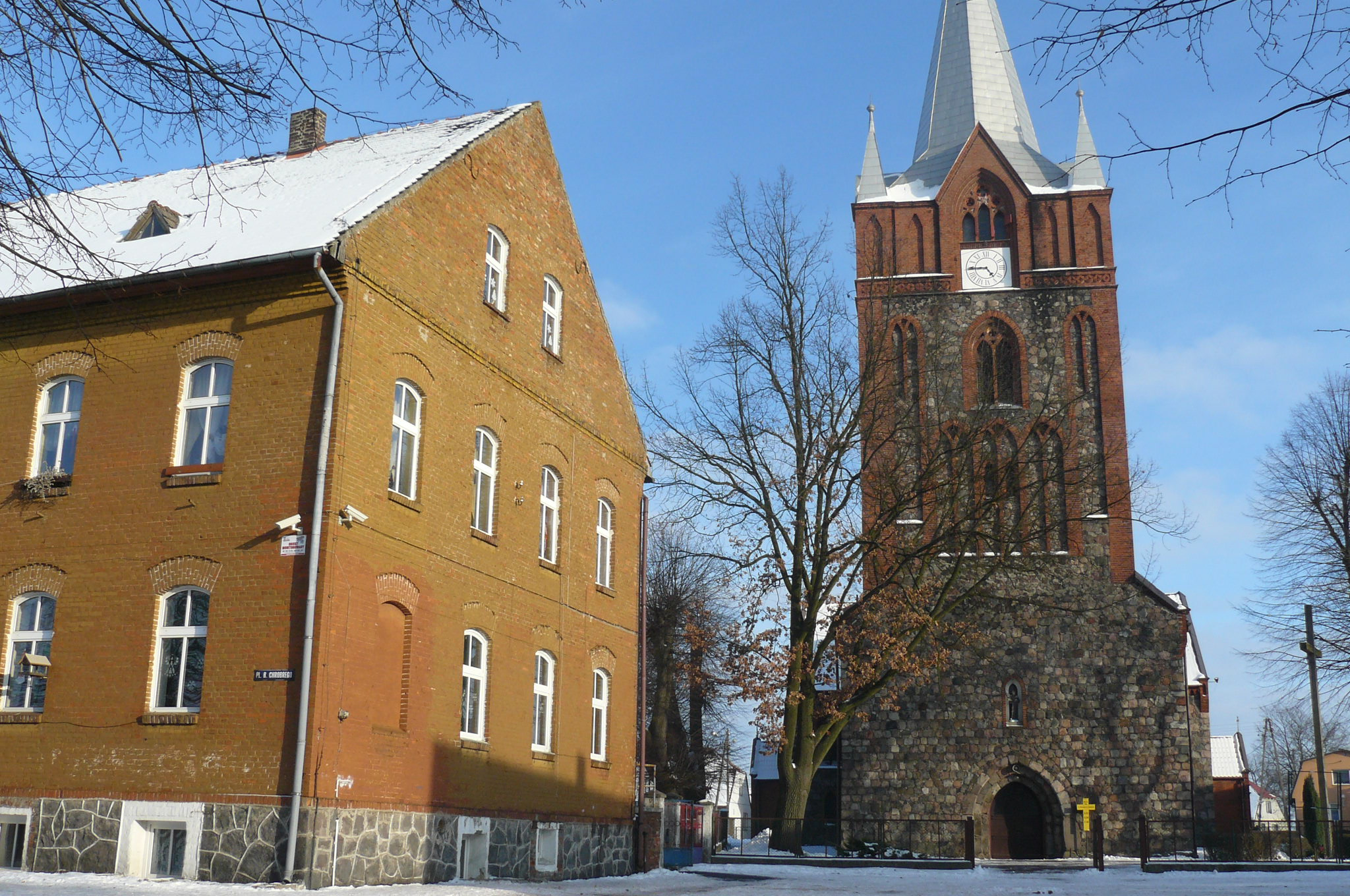
- Church

- Location within Poland
- Coordinates: 52°43′N 14°34′E
- Country: Poland
- Voivodeship: West Pomeranian
- County: Myślibórz
- Gmina: Boleszkowice
- Elevation: 43 m (141 ft)
- Population: 1,316

Boleszkowice [bɔlɛʂkɔˈvit͡sɛ] (German: Fürstenfelde) is a village in Myślibórz County, West Pomeranian Voivodeship, in north-western Poland, close to the German border. It is the seat of the gmina (administrative district) called Gmina Boleszkowice. It lies approximately 32 km (20 mi) south-west of Myślibórz and 78 km (48 mi) south of the regional capital Szczecin.

The village has a population of 1,316.
