= Dębno =

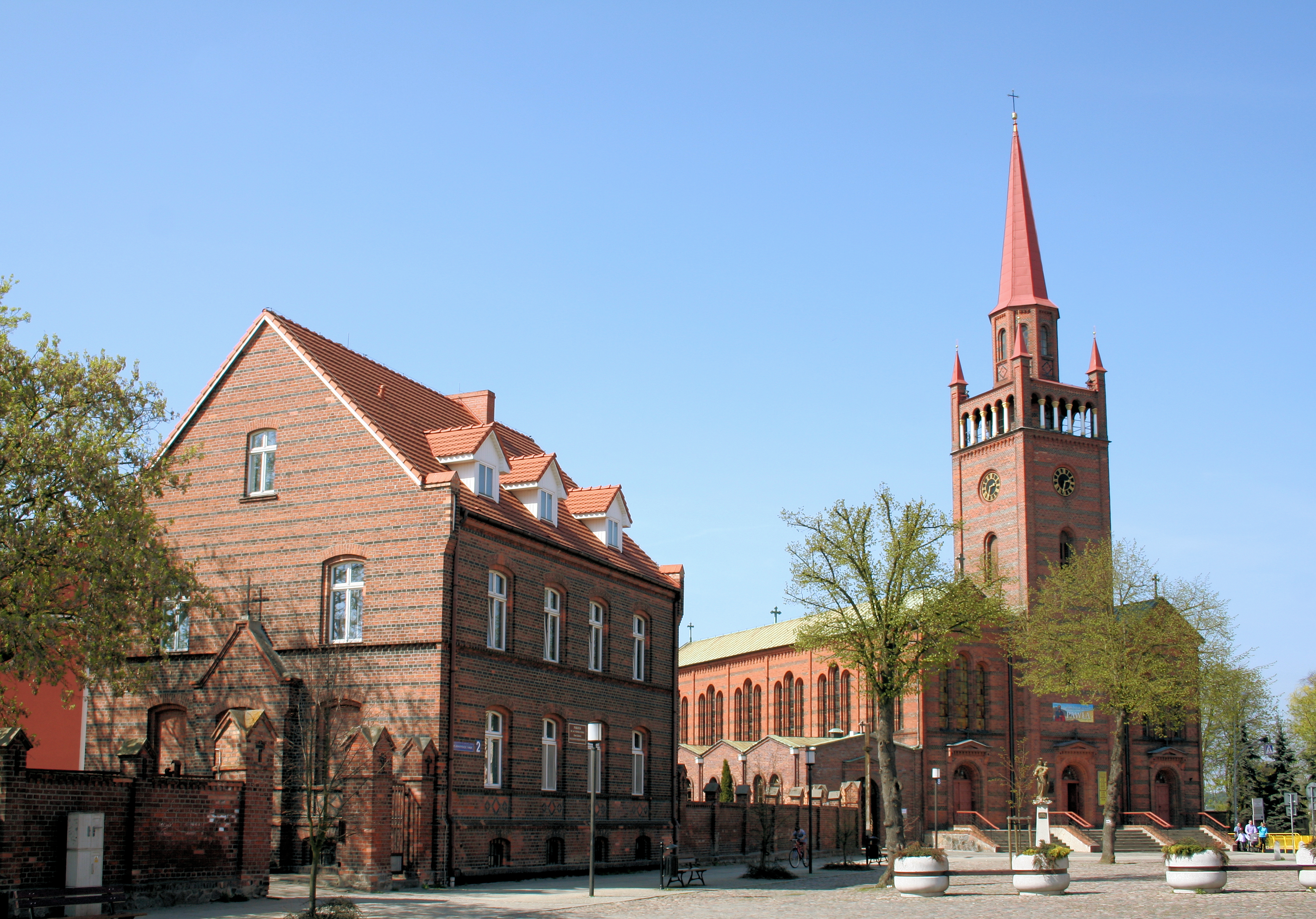
- Dębno

- Flag Coat of arms

- Location within Poland
- Coordinates: 52°44′N 14°42′E
- Country: Poland
- Voivodeship: West Pomeranian
- County: Myślibórz
- Gmina: Dębno
- Town rights: 1731

Government
  - Mayor: Wojciech Czepułkowski

Area
  - Total: 19.51 km^{2} (7.53 sq mi)
- Elevation: 40 m (130 ft)

Population (2024)
  - Total: 12,010
  - Density: 615/km^{2} (1,590/sq mi)
- Time zone: UTC+1 (CET)
  - Summer (DST): UTC+2 (CEST)
- Postal code: 74-400
- Area code: +48 95
- Vehicle registration: ZMY
- Website: http://www.debno.pl/

Dębno [ˈdɛmbnɔ] (German: Neudamm) is a town in Myślibórz County, West Pomeranian Voivodeship in western Poland. It is the seat of Gmina Dębno. As of December 2021, the town has a population of 13,443.

Despite its location in the West Pomeranian Voivodeship, Dębno is part of the historic Lubusz Land.

Dębno is known for hosting the oldest marathon in Poland (since 1969), one of the five marathons included in the Crown of Polish Marathons, along with marathons in Kraków, Poznań, Warsaw and Wrocław.

The Dębno oil field is located near the town.

== History ==
After the Migration Period, the area was populated by Polish tribes since the 6th century. In the 10th century it became part of the emerging Polish state under its first historic ruler Mieszko I. In 1232 Dębno was granted by Duke Władysław Odonic of the Piast dynasty to the Knights Templar. Later, it was invaded by Saxons immediately after the invasion and annexation of the Catholic Duchy of Kopanica, a Polish fief. The castle of Dębno belonged to the House of Odrowąż. In 1373 the town became part of the Lands of the Bohemian Crown (or Czech Lands), ruled by the Luxembourg dynasty. In 1402, the Luxembourgs reached an agreement with Poland in Kraków. Poland was to buy and re-incorporate the town and the surrounding region, but eventually the Luxembourgs sold it to the Teutonic Order, which remained in power until 1454.

During World War II, the German administration operated a subcamp of the Sachsenhausen concentration camp in the town.

== List of Mayors ==
No.	Name	Term of office		
No.	Name	Took office	Left office	Time in office
1.	Roman Stryjewski	12 June 1990	21 October 1993	3 years, 4 months and 9 days
2.	Piotr Wojewoda	22 October 1993	17 November 1993	26 days
3.	Danuta Leśniak-Chanecka	18 November 1993	28 April 1994	5 months and 10 days
4.	Janusz Kotas	17 July 1994	2 October 1995	1 year, 2 months and 15 days
5.	Andrzej Brzozowski	2 October 1995	21 November 1995	1 month and 19 days
6.	Ryszard Święcicki	21 November 1995	18 November 2002	6 years, 11 months and 28 days
7.	Piotr Ryszard Downar	19 November 2002	22 November 2018	16 years and 3 days
8.	Grzegorz Kulbicki	22 November 2018	7 May 2024	5 years, 5 months and 15 days
9.	Wojciech Czepułkowski	7 May 2024	Incumbent	2 years, 4 months and 13 days

== Notable residents ==
- Franz Alexander von Kleist (1769–1797), poet
- Franz Hilgendorf (1839–1904), zoologist and paleontologist
- Friedrich W. K. Müller (1863–1930), German scholar of oriental cultures and languages
- Arthur Hübner (1885–1937) a German philologist, researched German literature from the Middle Ages
- Antoni Dobrowolski (1904–2012) a Polish educator and the oldest known survivor of Auschwitz
- Joanna Szarawaga (born 1994) a Polish handballer for GTPR Gdynia and the Polish national team

== International relations ==
Dębno signed partnership agreements with:

- Strausberg, Germany (1978)
- Renkum, Netherlands (1990)
- Tczew, Poland (2000)
- Terezín, Czech Republic (2003)
- Nowy Tomyśl, Poland (2010)
- Grodzisk Wielkopolski, Poland (2022)
- Postomino, Poland (2022)

== See also ==
- Coat of arms of Dębno
