= Klicko =

- Village
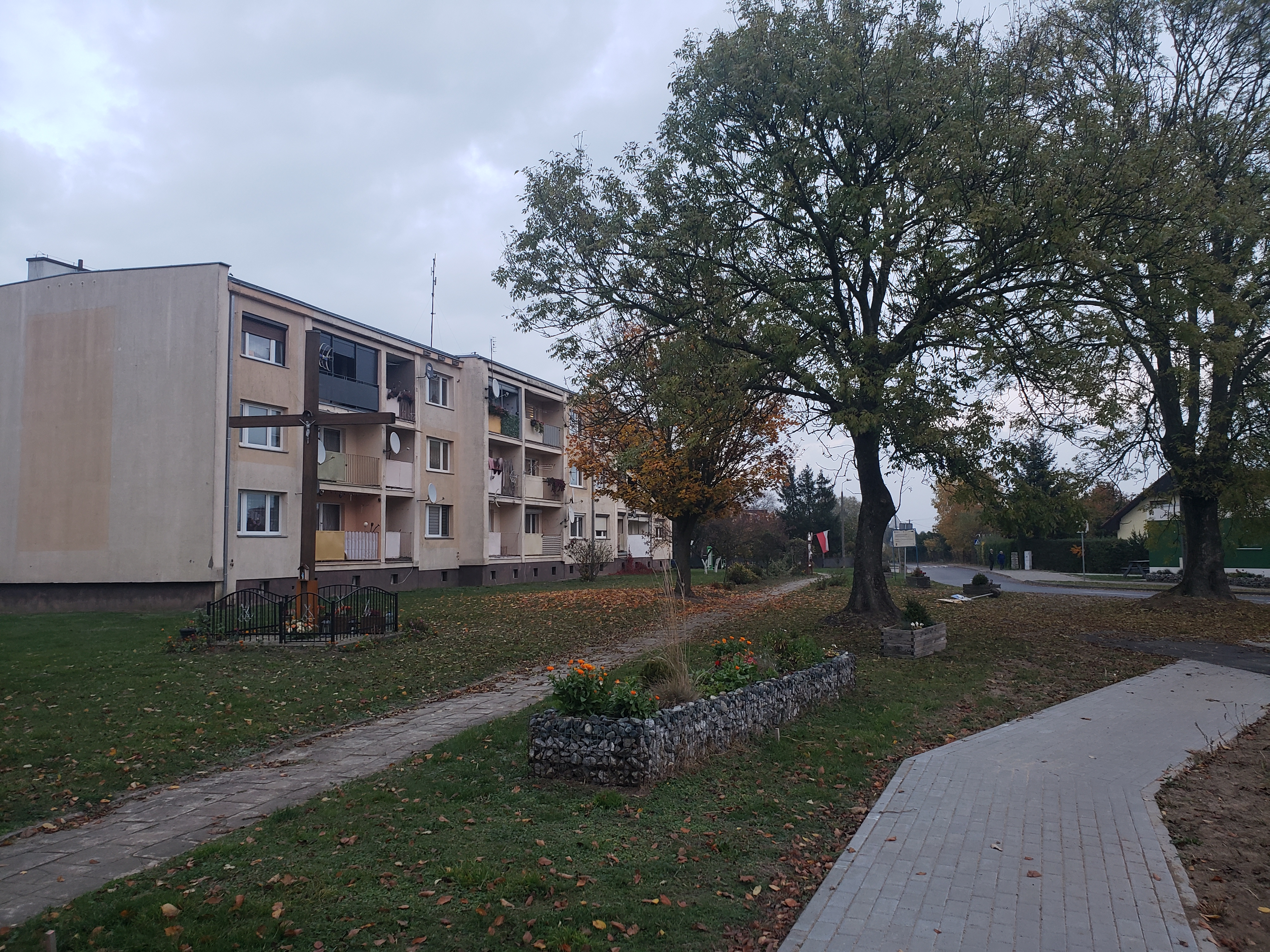
- Entry road into the village

- Location within Poland
- Coordinates: 52°55′N 14°54′E
- Country: Poland
- Voivodeship: West Pomeranian
- County: Myślibórz
- Gmina: Myślibórz

Government
  - Sołtys: Marcelina Dolacińska
- Population (2021): 302
- Postal code: 74-300
- Vehicle registration: ZMY

Klicko [ˈklit͡skɔ] (German: Schlegelsburg) is a village in the Gmina Myślibórz, within Myślibórz County, West Pomeranian Voivodeship, in north-western Poland. It lies between the city of Myślibórz and the village of Renice. Within its administrative boundaries also lies the abandoned settlement Turzyniec.

== Geography ==
It lies approximately 3 km (2 mi) south-east of Myślibórz and 60 km (37 mi) south of the regional capital Szczecin. It borders Myślibórz to the west, Myśliborzyce to the south-west, Ławy to the south-east, Renice to the east, and Dąbrowa to the north. The closest settlements within these village boundaries are Myślibórz, Mirawno/Myśliborzyce, Pluty, Renice (interrupted by the abandoned settlement of Turzyniec), and Podłążek respectively.

Turzyniec, an abandoned settlement lies within the administrative boundaries of the village, the only other settlement to do so.

Klicko lies east of the Jezioro Renickie (German: Rehnitzer Klietz See) ribbon lake, across which Renice is located.

== History ==
The Schlegelsburg estate had an area of 3.8 ha (9 acres) between the years 1850 and 1860. It has historically always been a part of the city/municipality of Soldin/Myślibórz.

Turzyniec has been a part of Klicko since 1999.

A pedestrian and bicycle path was constructed between Klicko and Myślibórz in 2024.

== Demographics ==
The villages' population is 302 as of the 2021 census. 51.7% (146) of the residents are male and 43.3% (156) are female. Of the residents, 19.9% (60) are under the age of 17 while 20.9% (63) are above the age of 60.

Historical population

Year	Pop.	±%
1840	26	—
1849	24	−7.7%
1852	41	+70.8%

Year	Pop.	±%
1895	74	+80.5%
2011	330	+345.9%
2021	302	−8.5%

Data may be affected by territorial fluctuation.
Sources: 1840, 1849, 1852, 1895, 2011 & 2021

== Politics ==
The current sołtys (village head) of Klicko is Marcelina Dolacińska.

== Notable people ==
- Hans-Joachim Haupt (1876–1942), a German World War II major general, was born in Schlegelsburg (now Klicko)
