= Myśliborskie Lake =

Lake in Myślibórz, Poland

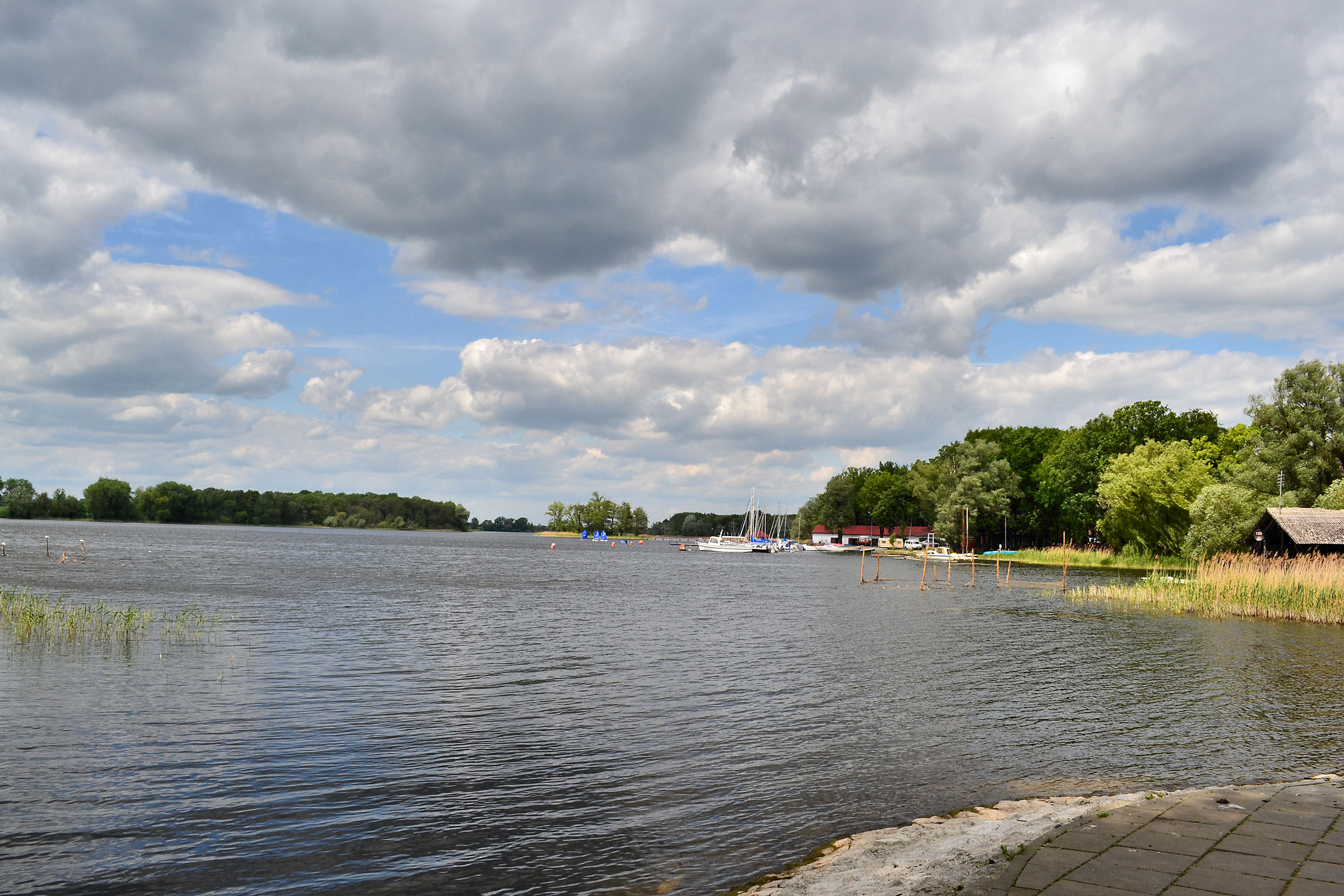
- Interactive map of Myśliborskie Lake
- Location: Myślibórz, Poland
- Coordinates: 52°57′18″N 14°51′42″E
- Max. length: 6.5 km (4.0 mi)
- Max. width: 1.6 km (0.99 mi)
- Surface area: 617.7 ha (1,526 acres)
- Average depth: 8.4 m (28 ft)
- Max. depth: 22.3 m (73 ft)
- Water volume: 51,943,400 m^{3} (1.83436×10^{9} cu ft)
- Shore length^{1}: 21 km (13 mi)
- Islands: 1
- ^{1} Shore length is not a well-defined measure.

Myśliborskie Lake is a large lake in western Poland, located in West Pomeranian Voivodeship, in Myślibórz County, in Gmina Myślibórz, within the administrative boundaries of the town of Myślibórz.

== Location and description ==
Myśliborskie Lake lies in the central part of Myślibórz County within the Myślibórz Lake Land, where it is the largest body of water. The town of Myślibórz extends along its southern shore. The surrounding area consists mainly of meadows and agricultural fields, with a belt of trees and shrubs directly bordering the lake. The lake's outflow is the Myśla river, which carries water southward. Several small streams feed the lake, including Kruszwin Canal from the west, Będziński Canal and Czółnów Canal from the east, and Głęboki Canal from the north. A small island is located in the southern part of the lake.

The lake is suitable for sailing and water tourism. It hosts international regattas, such as the Leonid Teliga Regatta and the Blue Ribbon Regatta of Myśliborskie Lake. In addition to Myślibórz, several villages are situated around the lake, including Czółnów, Dąbrowa, Kruszwin, and Utonie.

== Hydronymy ==
The lake is first mentioned in sources from 1780 as Soldinsche See, followed by Soldiner See (1833), Soldyńskie (1883), Myśliborskie Jezioro (1951), and J. Myśliborze (1964). The current official name, Myśliborskie Jezioro, was established on 4 April 1950.

== Morphometry ==
According to the Inland Fisheries Institute, the lake's surface area is 617.7 hectares. However, A. Choiński, using planimetric measurements on 1:50,000 maps, estimated the area at 595 hectares. The lake's uniform water body has an area of 637 hectares.

The average depth is 8.4 meters, with a maximum depth of 22.3 meters. The lake's volume is 51,943.4 thousand cubic meters. Its maximum length is 6,500 meters, and its width is 1,600 meters. The shoreline length is 21 kilometers.

According to Atlas jezior Polski (ed. J. Jańczak, 1996), the water surface is at 58 meters above sea level, while the digital terrain model from Geoportal indicates 58.2 meters.

The lake lies within the sixth-level catchment area of the "Direct Catchment of Myśliborskie Lake" according to the Hydrographic Division Map of Poland. Its identifier is 191259.

== Management ==
In the water management system, the lake forms a uniform water body with the code PLLW10946. The Regional Water Management Authority in Szczecin administers the lake's waters. It has established a fishing circuit that includes the waters of Myśliborskie Lake, Czółnów Lake, Łubie Lake, Renickie Lake, and Wierzbnickie Lake (Myśliborskie Lake Fishing Circuit on the Myśla River – No. 5). Fishery management is conducted by Grzegorz Siwek Agricultural and Fishery Farm. Between 2010 and 2019, commercial fishing primarily yielded common bream, followed by common roach and northern pike.

The lake also serves recreational purposes. Two bathing sites compliant with the Bathing Water Directive are designated: "Cienista Street Bathing Site in Myślibórz" and "Szarych Szeregów Street Bathing Site in Myślibórz". In 2023, the water quality at bathing sites was rated excellent at both locations.

== Water quality and environmental protection ==
Until the late 1980s, the lake received significant urban pollution, leading to beach closures in 1983 and 1984 due to bacterial contamination. By the late 1980s, wastewater management improved with the construction of a municipal sewage treatment plant. However, in the early 1990s, the use of liquid manure from surrounding farms for agricultural fertilization remained a concern. In 1993, the lake's waters were classified as Class II water quality, with moderate nitrogen and phosphorus levels. Summer chlorophyll concentrations indicated increased primary production, and water transparency was approximately 2 meters.

In 2014, the lake's waters were assessed as having a moderate ecological status, corresponding to Class III quality. The classification was based on the condition of phytoplankton and macrophytes, while phytobenthos was rated as good. The chemical status of waters was deemed good, with no exceedances of tested parameters. In 2021, tests on fish tissues revealed exceedances of PBDE and mercury levels among priority substances in water policy. The fish population, assessed over a decade of fishing, was in good condition.

The lake is part of the nature park named B (Myślibórz). The northern shore borders areas designated as Natura 2000 special protection habitats, part of the Myślibórz Lake Land special area of conservation.
