= Renice, Poland =

Renice
- Village
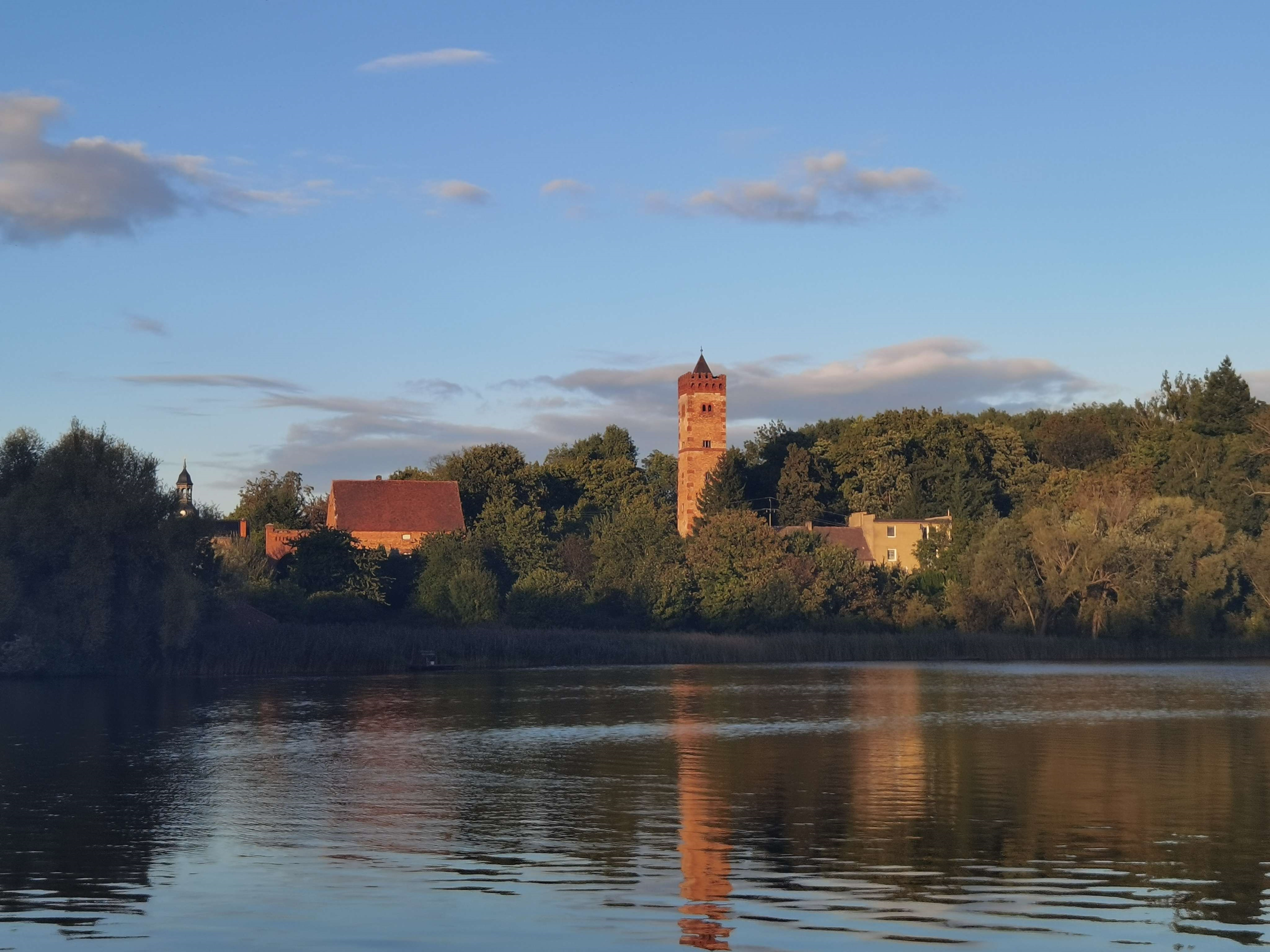
- Renice as seen from the other side of the lake

- Location within Poland
- Coordinates: 52°55′53″N 14°56′29″E
- Country: Poland
- Voivodeship: West Pomeranian
- County: Myślibórz
- Gmina: Myślibórz
- First mentioned: 1238 or 1260

Government
  - Sołtys: Krzysztof Głownia
  - Kultokrat: Lukas Ziolkowski

Population (2025)
  - Total: 332
- Time zone: UTC+1 (CET)
  - Summer (DST): UTC+2 (CEST)
- Postal code: 74-300
- Vehicle registration: ZMY

Renice [rɛˈnit͡sɛ] (German: Rehnitz) is a village in Gmina Myślibórz, within Myślibórz County, West Pomeranian Voivodeship, in north-western Poland.

== Geography ==
Renice lies approximately 6 km (4 mi) east of Myślibórz and 59 km (37 mi) south-east of the regional capital Szczecin. The next settlements are Ławy to the south, Klicko to the west (interrupted by the abandoned settlement of Turzyniec), Podłążek to the north-west, Strzelnik to the north, Giżyn to the east, and Świątki to the south-east.

Renice is an important crossroads in Gmina Myślibórz due to the E65 highway intersecting with the national road DK26 (towards Myślibórz) and the Voivodeship road DW119 (towards Gorzów Wielkopolski) in the northern part of the village. This northern part of Renice lies on the intersection of the DK26 and DW119 and is home to two gas stations as well as the AUTO PORT restaurant and hotel, one of the few places in Poland to house a privately owned crocodile. The infrastructure in this northern part of Renice surrounds the former German farming estate of Louisenhof.

Southwest of Renice proper lies a ribbon lake named Jezioro Renickie (German: Rehnitzer Klietz See). East of Renice lies a large forest called Lasy Sulimierskie (German: Adamsdorfer Forst).

== History ==
Numerous prehistoric finds were made in the area of modern-day Renice, mostly in connection to the Lusatian and Jastorf cultures, but also the Únětice culture. In the 1930s, a German archaeological site, named Rehnitzbruch, uncovered multiple bronze treasures including a bronze statue nicknamed "Egyptian king of Rehnitzbruch" (German: ägyptischer König von Rehnitzbruch) which is thought to have been an ancient Greco-Roman import to the area. Additionally, 1.5 km (1 mi) southwest of Renice proper exists a small gord in which ceramics were found that are attributed to the aforementioned Lusatian and Jastorf cultures as well as the late medieval period.

According to some sources, Renice was first mentioned in 1238, while other sources attribute the first mention to 1260 when it was recorded as Reniz by Barnim I of Pomerania. The village would then be known by various other names such as: Renske/Rentze (1298), Renz (1325), Retz (1334), Rentz (1337/66), Rentz/Rentsze (1479), Rentz/Rentze (1491), Reynitz (1499), Reentz (1572), Reentz /Rentz (1603), Rhenitz (1714/37), Rehnitz (since 1809). The name is of old Slavic origin and likely comes from the word "Renna" which can roughly be translated as '[a village] built upon sandy gravel or scree'. After Polonisation following 1945, the modern name Renice was introduced.

During 1260, in what was possibly the first mention of the village, Renice, then Reniz, was involved in a dedication of 150 Hufen by Barnim I of Pomerania to the monastery in Coswig, Anhalt. By 1337, Rentz was home to both knightly and ecclesiastical holdings, with the first recorded owners of the village being the knightly von Holzbutel family who were first recorded in 1325 under Hermannus whose brother was last mentioned as holding ownership over the village in 1366. They were succeeded by the knightly von Liebenthal (also spelled Lyvendal or Levendal) family that had originated in Lusatia and first came to the region in the 13th century. Hasso von Liebenthal, who was also the Gutsherr of Klein Lindenbusch and Kraazen at the time, was first mentioned to hold these possessions in 1433.

=== Early modern period ===
The church in Rehnitz was rebuilt in 1600 and from at least 1603 onwards, Renice (then-Reentz) belonged to the Protestant parish in Glasow. In 1630, 63 residents of the village died of the plague.

During the start of the 17th century, then-Reentz was under the ownership of Konrad von Liebenthal who sold half of the village to the Hauptmann Alexander Magnus von Burgsdorff on 23 May 1603 for 6,500 Thalers. Burgsdorff quickly lost his holdings however, as on 27 March 1607, Sigismund von Liebenthal, cousin of Konrad, bought Burgsdorff's half of the village, bringing it back into the family. On 1 March 1611, Sigismund bought the other half of the village, which included the knightly seat and its assets, from his cousin Konrad, making him the sole owner of the village. Sigismund was succeeded by his son Joachim von Liebenthal who also served as the Landrat of the Soldin district and was presumably the last owner of the village from the von Liebenthal family as, by 1682, Hans Albrecht von Barfus is mentioned as the village's owner. Indeed, von Barfus had recently become the owner of multiple holdings around Soldin, with him purchasing most of them between the years 1673 and 1677. Ownership of the village then passed to the von Schweinichen family, about which little is known, until Christoph Friedrich I von Bismarck bought it from them in 1701 along with his brother Ludolf and cousin August. Christoph Friedrich I, who was succeeded by his son Ludolf August von Bismarck, became the first Erbherr (allod) of Rhenitz in 1714, with all the owners preceding him only being fiefs.

In a 1718 report, Rhenitz's agricultural lands were described as "middling" and it was noted that its area was divided into three fields: two sandy and one "very swampy". Mentioned inhabitants of the village included 6 cotters, who owned one Hufe each; a tavern-keeper (Krüger), who poured about one barrel of beer every 14 days; and a miller, who owned a windmill and one Mühlenhufe. In 1714, it was also mentioned that a schoolmaster, who did not own any land, lived in the village.

Ownership of Rhenitz fell to the von Hagen family with Tido Christoph von Hagen, Landrat of the Soldin district and Erbherr of Naulin, and his second wife, Eleonore Ernestine von Wedel, purchasing the village around 1732. Tido Christoph's daughter, Christiane Louise, had her second marriage, with Christoph Otto von Loeben, in Rhenitz on 16 August 1729. Tido Christoph was succeeded by his younger son Philipp Sigismund who moved to the Memelland around 1741, leaving only his mother in Rhenitz where she died in 1748. The village was then sold to Johann Dietrich Schmieden on 27 March 1749 for 20,000 Thalers. Although the village was again sold to Friedrich August von Sydow in 1790 for 29,886 Thalers, Johann Dietrich Schmieden's descendens likely kept stake in parts of the village as documents between the miller and the family from 1819 and 1820 indicate. Friedrich August von Sydow, who also owned Schönow, Woltersdorf, and Glasow; united the latter with Rehnitz into the Gütergemeinschaft Rehnitz-Glasow administrative unit that would henceforth be administrated from its centre of power in Rehnitz. This administrative union of villages would persist until 1928. Ludmillus Paul Alexander von Sydow was the last member of the family that would inherit the village union, with him selling it to Karl Wilhelm Phemel in 1837. At this time, Rehnitz-Glasow was among the largest single properties in the Soldin district, being measured at a total of 2,400 Morgen or roughly 6 km^{2} (2.3 sq mi) in 1856.

By 1800, Rehnitz was home to the manor and 19 houses or fireplaces with 149 total inhabitants, thereof: 6 cotters and, depending on the source, either 12 einlieger or häusler; as well as one blacksmith, one windmill, and one forestry.

In 1854, a brickworks (Ziegelei) was first reported to be present in the village. Karl Wilhelm Phemel would significantly develop the estate (Gutshof) in Rehnitz, with him overseeing the construction of the village distillery and various economic as well as residential buildings, including in the Vorwerk Louisenhof. Karl Wilhelm Phemel's wife, Auguste Amalie Peters, would inherit the estate upon her husband's death in 1880. She would hold it until her own passing in 1896, when she was succeeded by the couple's only daughter, Anna Dorothea Luisa, who married Albert Heinrich Conze in the village on 22 June 1863. Karl Wilhelm Phemel's gravestone is still located in the cemetery of Renice to this day.

With the opening of the Pyritz–Küstrin railway in 1882, that connected via Glasow, north of Rehnitz proper and part of the Gütergemeinschaft Rehnitz-Glasow, produce and goods from Rehnitz were now easily and cheaply able to traverse long distances, helping the local economy.

By 1895, Rehnitz was still a part of the Protestant Glasow parish and had a population of 218, split into 50% (109) male and 50% (109) female. The religious affiliation in Rehnitz in 1895 consisted of 217 Protestants and one catholic.

=== Hugo Oppenheim ===
In 1905, the whole Gütergemeinschaft Rehnitz-Glasow, was purchased by the Berliner banker Hugo Otto Joseph Oppenheim and his wife Anna Rosa Oppenheim, who was also his cousin. Originally from the East Prussian city of Königsberg, the family was of Protestant confession and Jewish origin. Oppenheim was primarily known for his ventures in Berlin where he was involved in multiple banks, with the family maintaining a mansion in Berlin-Tiergarten until Hugo's death. The funds for the purchase of Rehnitz-Glasow were acquired through the sale of the Robert Warschauer & Co. bank building in Berlin and it is believed that Oppenheim purchased Rehnitz-Glasow due to its proximity to the Bärfelde, which was owned by Karl Wilhelm von Sydow, a close friend of Oppenheim.

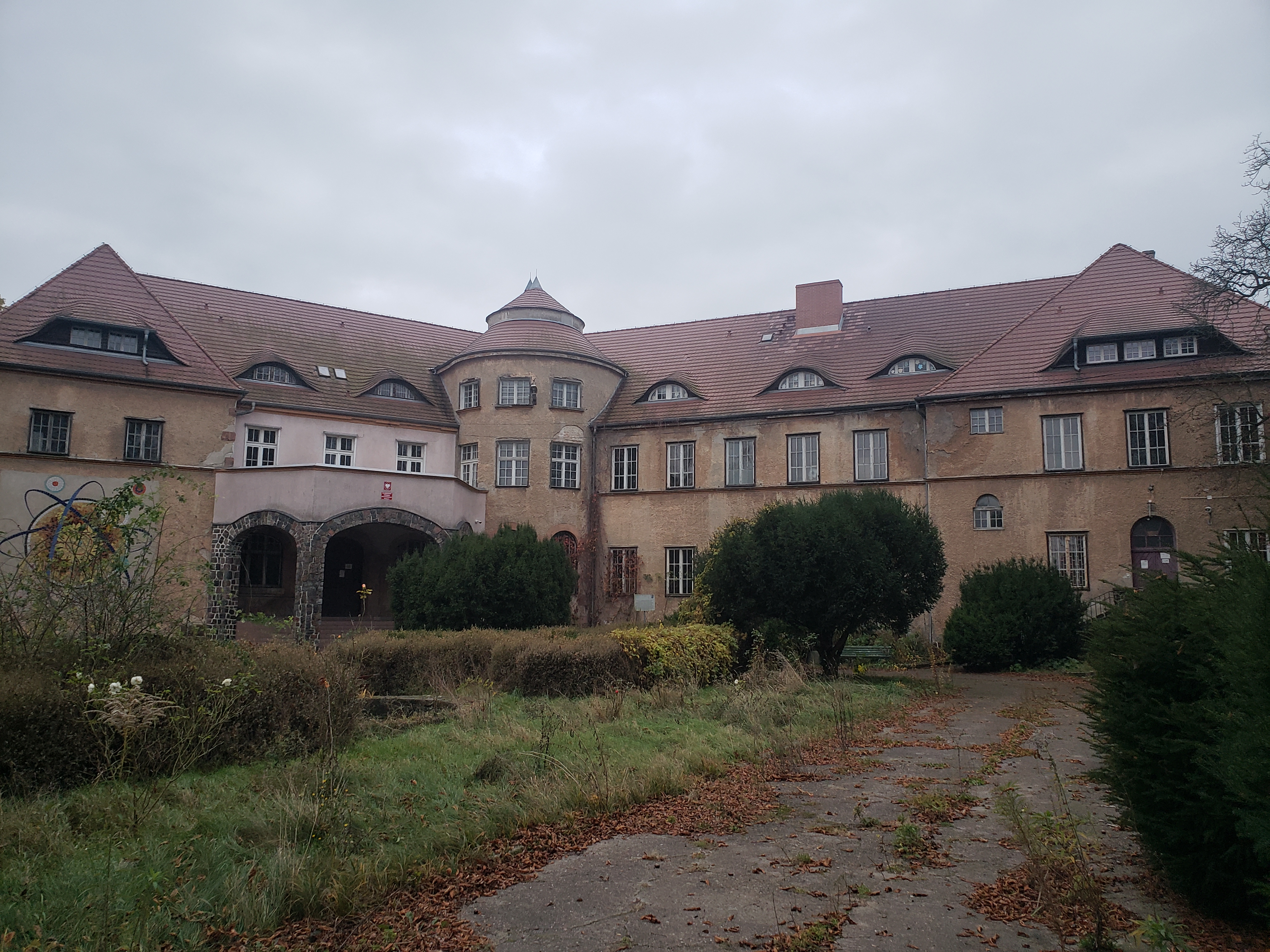
Renice palace, view from the back entrance facing the street

Oppenheim was a significant figure in the history of Rehnitz, and especially its manor house, which he commissioned for expansion almost immediately after his purchase of the estate. The expansion of the manor house into a palace (Schloss) was realized between 1906 and 1908, with the work being completed in 1909 to critical acclaim in architectural magazines. The architect of this expansion, Emanuel von Seidl from Munich, was an acquaintance of Oppenheim and well known for his blending of Historicism and the Jugendstil which is also reflected in the Rehnitz palace.

The Oppenheim family also severely expanded the agricultural estate but took not only profits, but also the welfare of their workers into great consideration. These employees and their families would, besides their regular salary, also receive free housing and welfare in the palace; the latter included the construction of a kindergarten and retirement home as well as the renovation of the village school. Workers also received other bonuses such as schnapps and potatoes. The agricultural estate was also specialized to focus on animal products, with the best animals being presented at shows and competition. Modernization also took place, with the agricultural work becoming party mechanized.

While Hugo was still alive, the Oppenheim family used Rehnitz only as a retreat, primarily for hunting, with the family's main residence remaining the Berlin-Tiergarten mansion. Only after Hugo's death in 1921, did his widowed Anna Rosa Oppenheim wife and their daughter Anna move to Rehnitz while selling the Berlin mansion. Anna Rosa Oppenheim would further sell many parts of the estate, particularly notable is the agricultural estate, which was sold to the Siedlungsgesellschaft "Eigene Scholle" from Frankfurt (Oder). Oppenheim would only keep the palace, park, forest, and lake; but these too, were sold by the inheritors upon her death in 1931.

=== World War II ===
The forest was bought by Richard von Tiedemann, son of Heinrich von Tiedemann-Seeheim, while the palace, park, and lake; were bought by the Bodelschwinghsche Anstalten, with Friedrich von Bodelschwingh aiming to transform the palace into a settlement-school for the Evangelischer Arbeitsdienst where young men from industrialized regions of Germany would have the opportunity to be schooled in agriculture. This aim was never realized however, as the new Nazi government seized the palace for the Reichsarbeitsdienst. The palace and its park were then transferred to the SA on 30 January 1935, which transformed it into a sports school. Later it was again repurposed, becoming a school for civil servants (Gauschule) of the Beamtenbund called Wilhelm-Frick-Schule. In 1941, it became a hospital for reserves; and between 1940 and 1942, it served as a school for deported Germans from Bessarabia, Volhynia, eastern Lesser Poland, and Slovenia. From 1942 onwards, Rehnitz was home to a small Nazi work camp that housed deported Slovenes from Austria, including the writer Andrej Kokot. The palace was also significantly renovated during these times. At some point during Nazi rule, the palace also served as a retreat for the Hitler Youth.

Rehnitz and its palace, which was occupied by Soviet soldiers in 1945, only sustained minor damage from World War II.

=== Since 1945 ===
After the flight and expulsion of Germans from the area, Rehnitz was placed under Polish administration and given its modern name.

Starting October 1949, the palace was became a state-operated educational and preventive institution for troubled youth. While the focus of the institution changed over time, it remained in operation until 2021, since which the palace has been unused.

Between 1975 and 1998, Renice was part of the Gorzów Voivodeship and since 1998, it has been a part of the West Pomeranian Voivodeship.

== Demographics ==
Historical population
Year	Pop.	±%
1800	149	—
1895	218	+46.3%
1900	291	+33.5%
1933	354	+21.6%
1939	345	−2.5%
2011	382	+10.7%
2021	346	−9.4%
2025	332	−4.0%
Data may be affected by territorial fluctuation. Sources: 1895, 1900, 1933 & 1939, 2011 & 2021, 2025

As of the 2021 census, Renice had a population of 346, thereof 177 male and 169 female.

Age distribution
Age	Nr.	%
0–9	38	11%
10–19	60	17%
20–29	29	8%
30–39	56	16%
40–49	40	12%
50–59	47	14%
60–69	37	11%
70–79	27	8%
80+	12	3%
Total	346	100%

== Politics ==
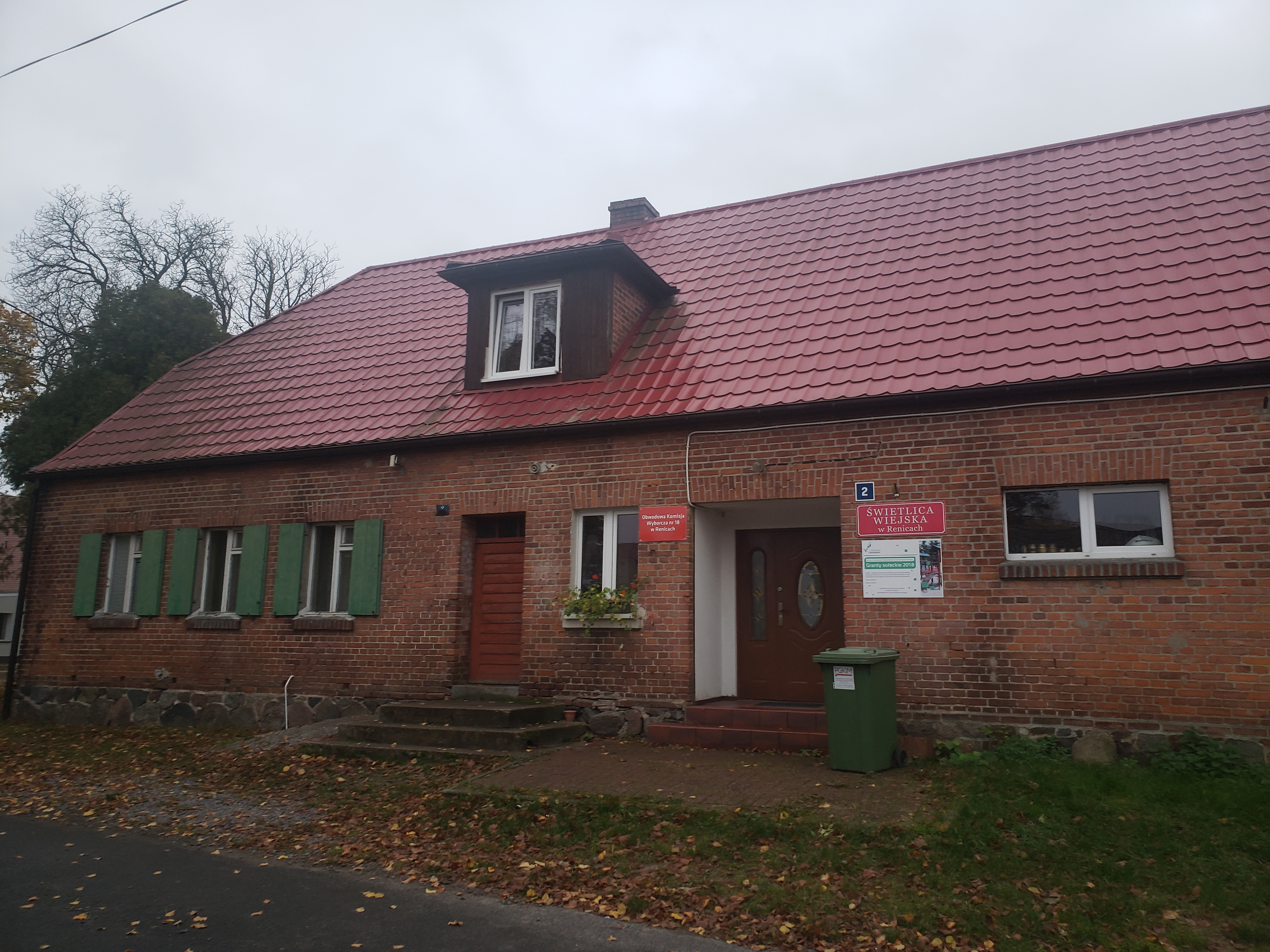
Community center and polling station

Renice is home to a community center which also acts as the local polling station during elections. It covers the polling district number 18 in Gmina Myślibórz.

=== Local government ===
The current sołtys (village head) of Renice is Krzysztof Głownia, who has been incumbent since his first election in 2007. He was preceded by Julia Chudzik who was in office from 2002 to 2007.

=== National election results ===
The last national elections in Poland were the 2023 Polish parliamentary election and the 2025 Polish presidential election; in these, Renice (polling district 18) voted as follows:

2023 Polish parliamentary election
Party	Votes	%
Law and Justice	64	37.65
Civic Coalition	43	25.29
New Left	28	16.47
Third Way (PSL–PL2050)	22	12.94
Confederation Liberty and Independence	8	4.71
Nonpartisan Local Government Activists	2	1.18
There is One Poland	2	1.18
Prosperity and Peace Movement	1	0.59
Total	170	100.0
Valid votes	170	4.12
Invalid/blank votes	7	3.95
Total votes	177	100.0
Turnout	177	70.80
Eligible voters	250	

2025 Polish presidential election
Candidate	Party	1st round		2nd round	
Candidate	Party	Votes	%	Votes	%
Karol Nawrocki	Independent (PiS)	42	27.81	85	54.84
Rafał Trzaskowski	Civic Coalition (PO)	34	22.52	70	45.16
Sławomir Mentzen	Confederation Liberty and Independence (NN)	26	17.22		
Grzegorz Braun	Confederation of the Polish Crown	21	13.91		
Szymon Hołownia	Third Way (Poland 2050)	10	6.62		
Magdalena Biejat	Independent (The Left)	6	3.97		
Joanna Senyszyn	Independent (SLD)	6	3.97		
Marek Jakubiak	Free Republicans	3	1.99		
Adrian Zandberg	Partia Razem	2	1.32		
Krzysztof Stanowski	Independent	1	0.66		
Total		151	100.0	155	100.0
Valid votes		151	99.34	155	100.0
Invalid/blank votes		1	0.66	0	0.00
Total votes		152	100.0	155	100.0
Turnout		152	60.56	155	62.75
Eligible voters		251		247	

== Culture ==
=== Sights ===
==== Palace ====
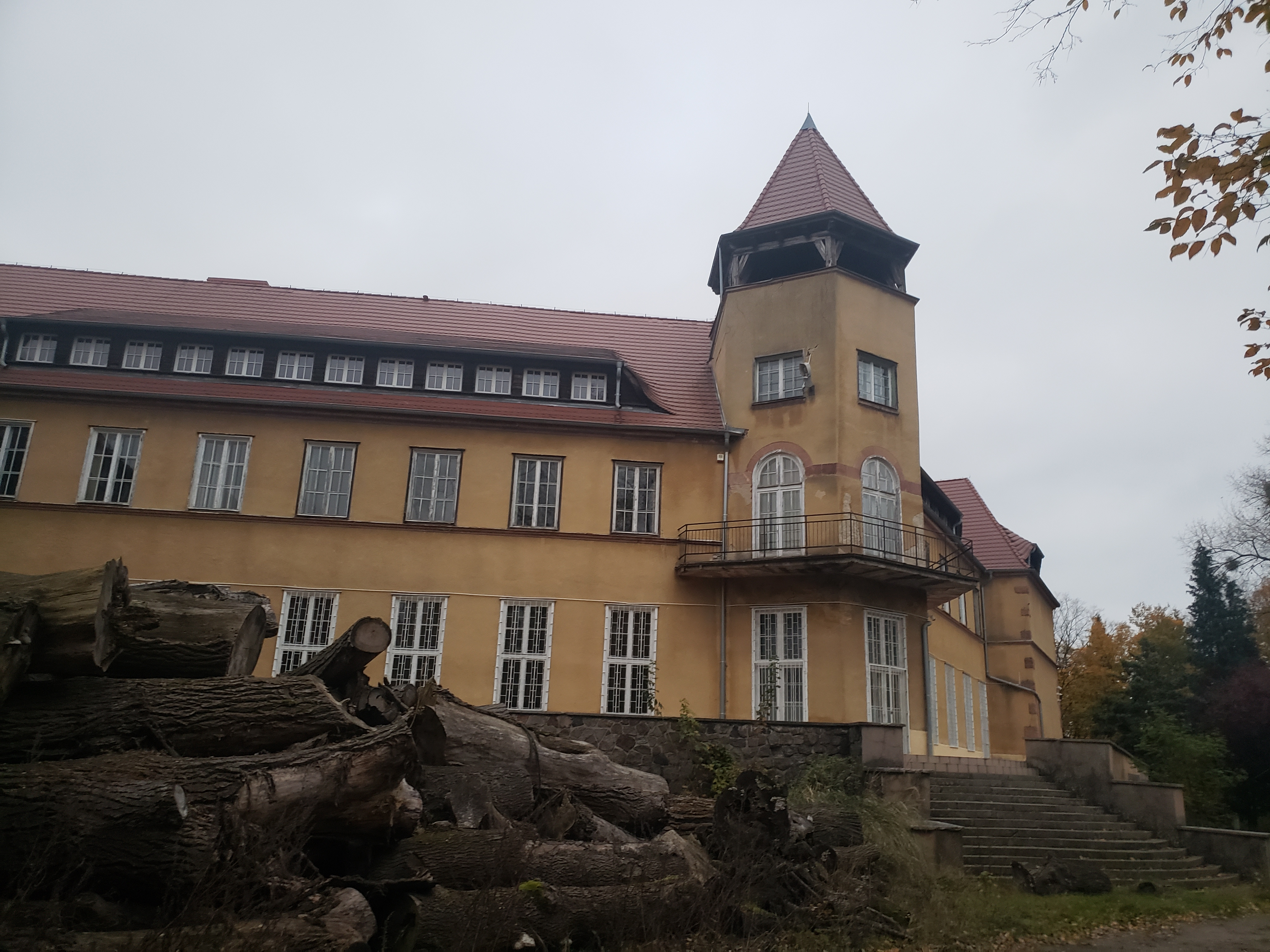
Front entrance of the palace, facing the estate park

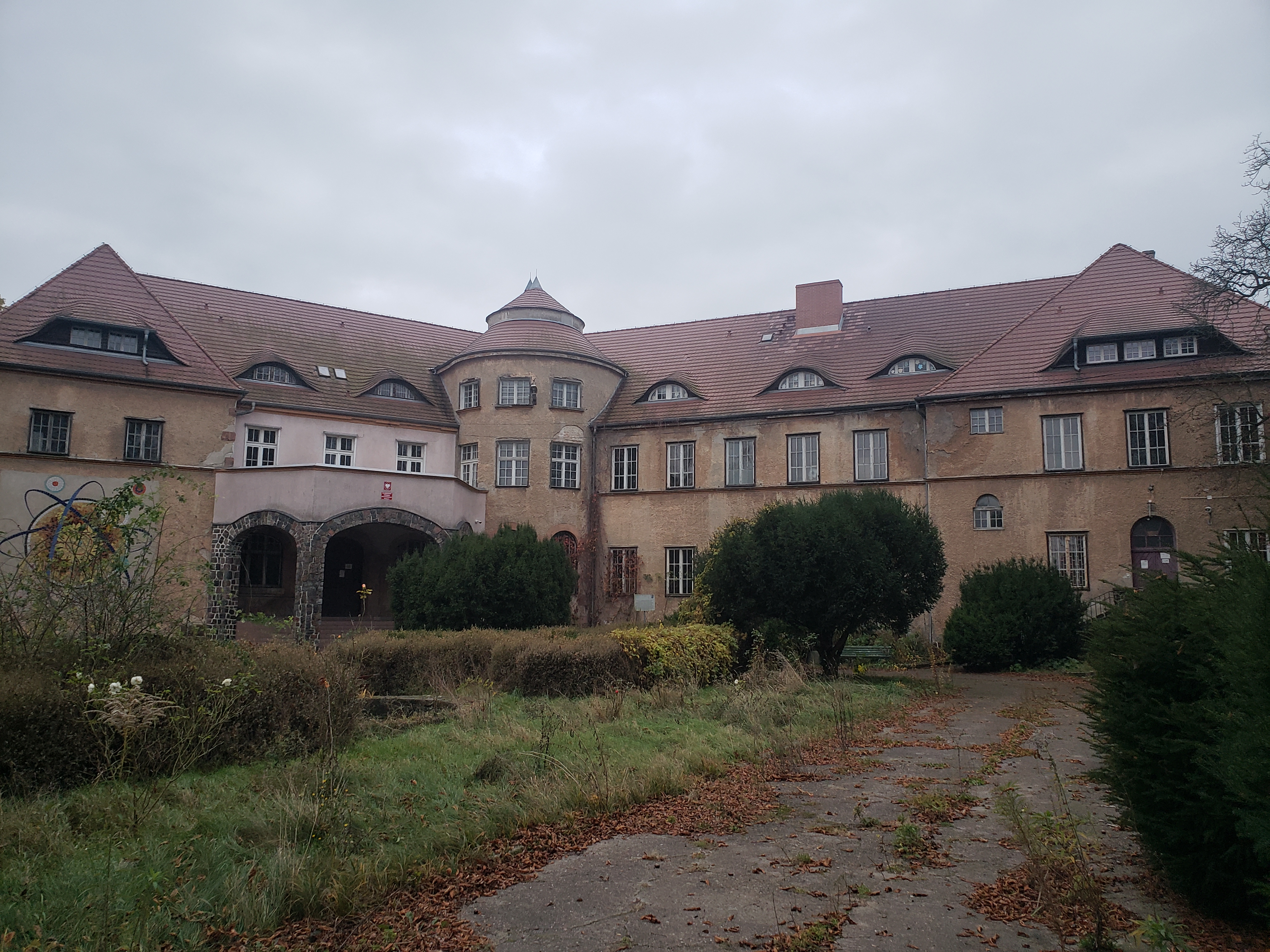
Back entrance of the palace, facing the street and village core

While Renice was likely already home to a manor house (Herrenhaus) during the Middle Ages, the first official mention of such a building was made in 1603. The latest iteration of the manor house before Hugo Oppenheim's massive expansion of the complex was likely constructed by Karl Wilhelm Phemel and lastet until the start of Oppenheim's renovations in 1905. The Oppenheim family commissioned for expansion of the manor house into a palace (Schloss) almost immediately after their purchase of the estate in 1905. These renovations were realized between 1906 and 1908, with the work being completed in 1909 to critical acclaim in architectural magazines. The architect of this expansion, Emanuel von Seidl from Munich, was an acquaintance of Oppenheim and well known for his blending of Historicism and the Jugendstil which is also reflected in the Rehnitz palace.

First used as a vacation and then primary residence of the Oppenheim family, the palace saw various uses over time, especially during the Nazi period, where it served as the location of various educational facilities as well as a hospital and part of a work camp. After World War II and upon falling under Polish administration, the palace became a correctional facility for troubled youths and, at some point, also orphans. It maintained this use case until 2021, since when the palace has been unused.

==== Water tower ====
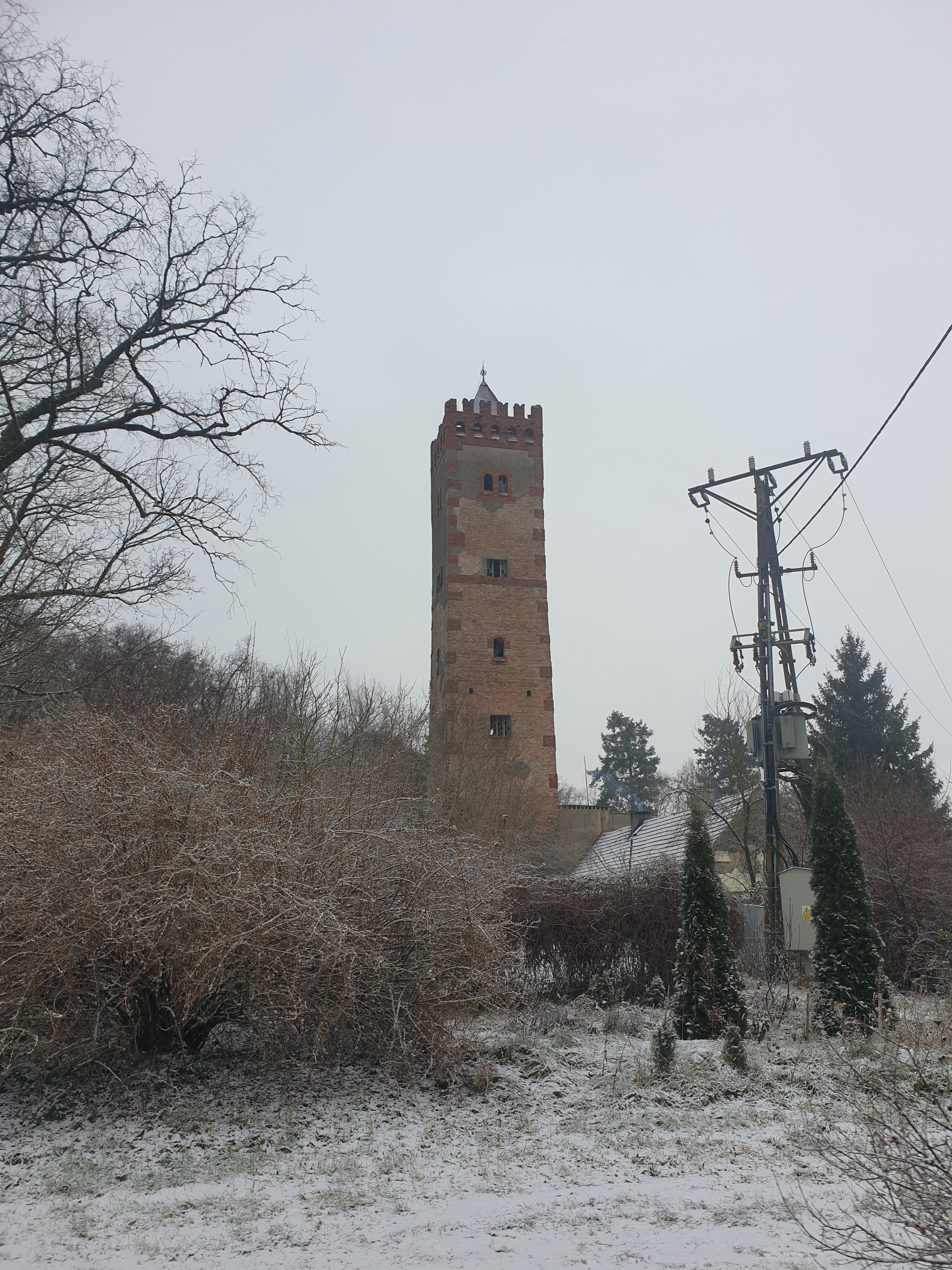
The water tower in winter

The Renice water tower was constructed in the early 20th century and originally connected to a water pump with filters in the estate park of the village. Originally connected to a stable which burnt down in 1957, the square stone and brick tower is six stories high, reached via a wooden staircase inside, with the top two stories being occupied by the water tank and a viewing deck respectively. It was severely renovated in the 1930s and remained in use until January 2003, when Renice was connected to the municipal water supply. It has since been unused.

==== Church ====
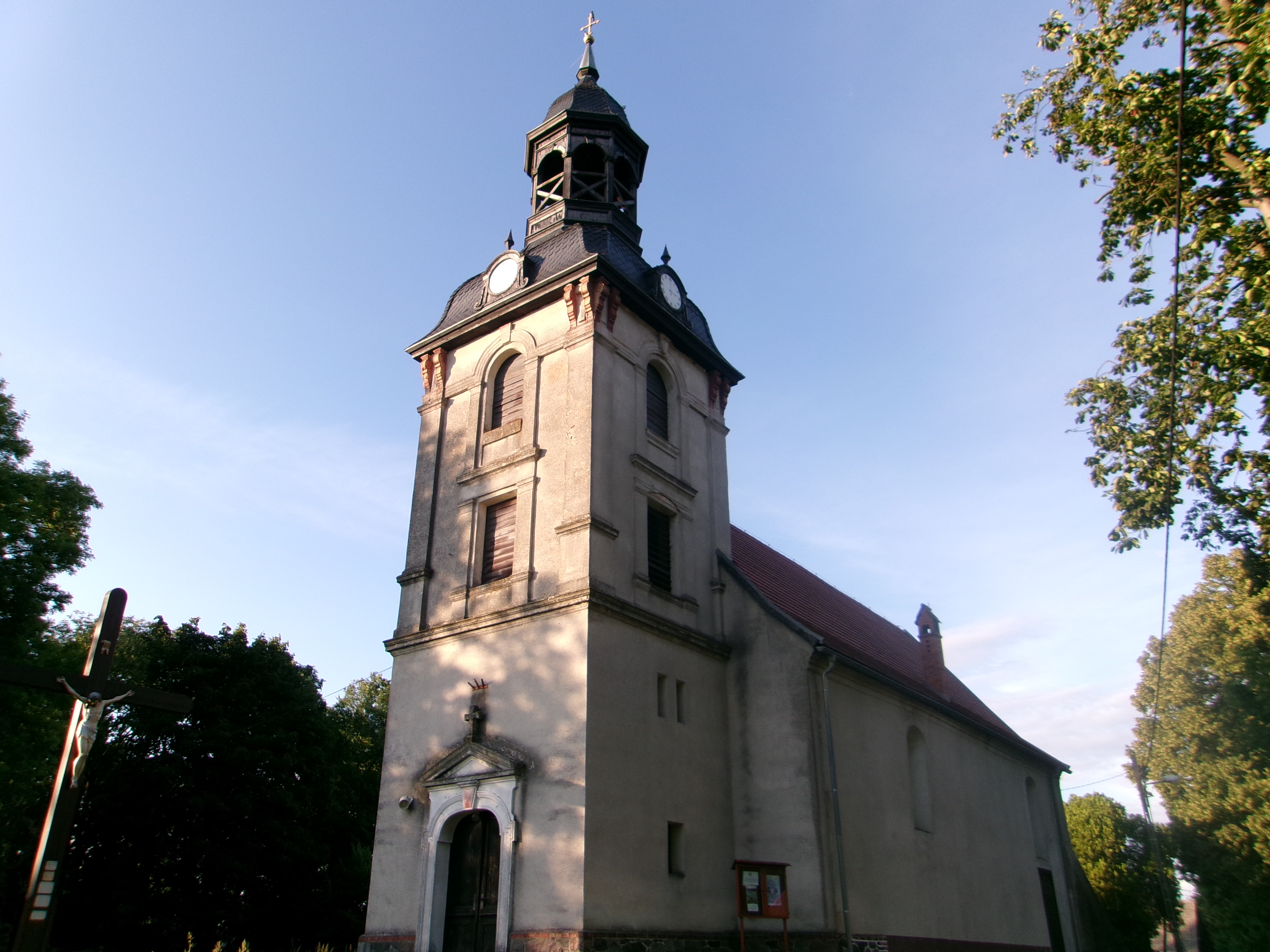
Village church

A church had existed in Renice since at least 1337. The modern village church dates back to 1600 when it replaced the old church that was presumably destroyed. Built in the mannerist style, the church likely incorporated parts of its predecessor which had stood at the same location atop a slight elevation in the historic village core. The church tower was severely reconstructed in the 1780s and the church bells were installed in 1782 and 1784 respectively. Further renovations on the church took place in the 1880s and during the Oppenheim period.

After World War II, the church was changed from a Protestant into a Roman Catholic one, being integrated into a Catholic parish on 15 September 1946. Initially dedicated to Saint Barbara, the church's patronage was changed to Our Lady of the Rosary in 1969 and later again to Nativity of Mary.

The church is surrounded by a, now mostly empty, cemetery that used to be planted with trees. Around 30 m to the north-west of the church itself lies the cemetery's chapel which was constructed during the start of the 20th century under the patronage of the Oppenheim family, likely also utilizing the palace's architect Emanuel von Seidl. A mosaic mural of Jesus above the chapel's entrance dates back to the chapel's construction.

== Gallery ==
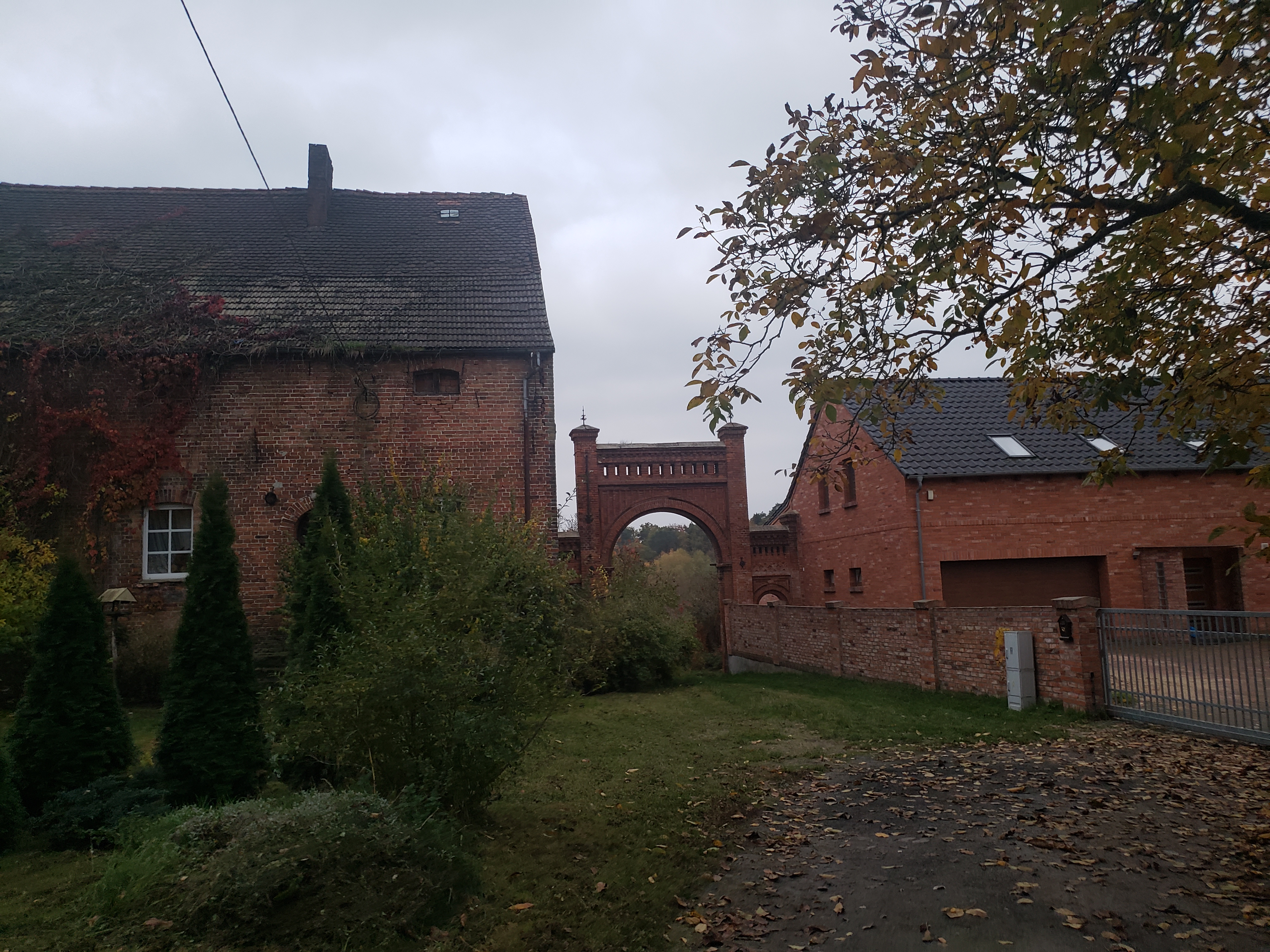
Old town gate towards the lake

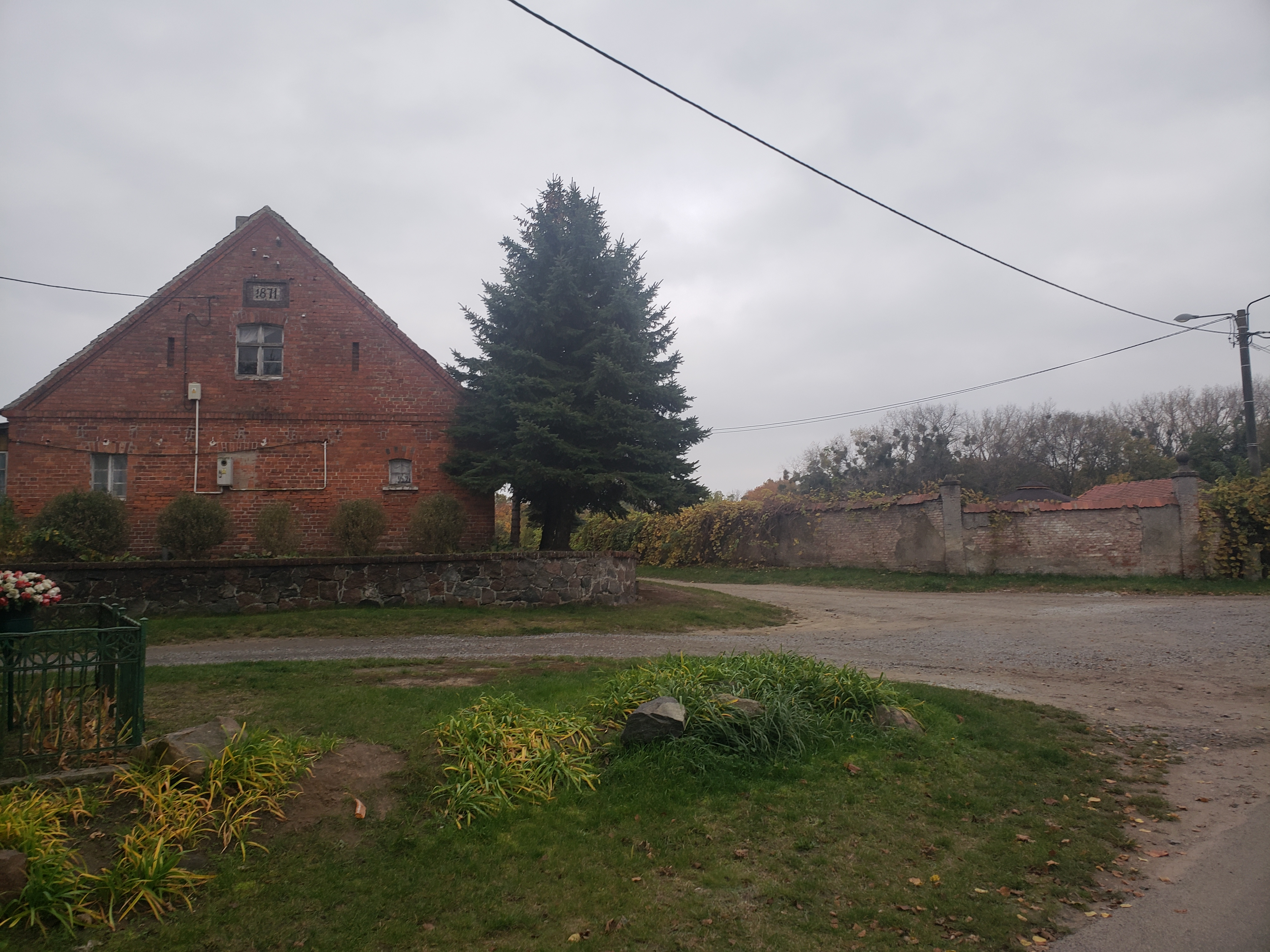
Entry road into the village of Renice proper

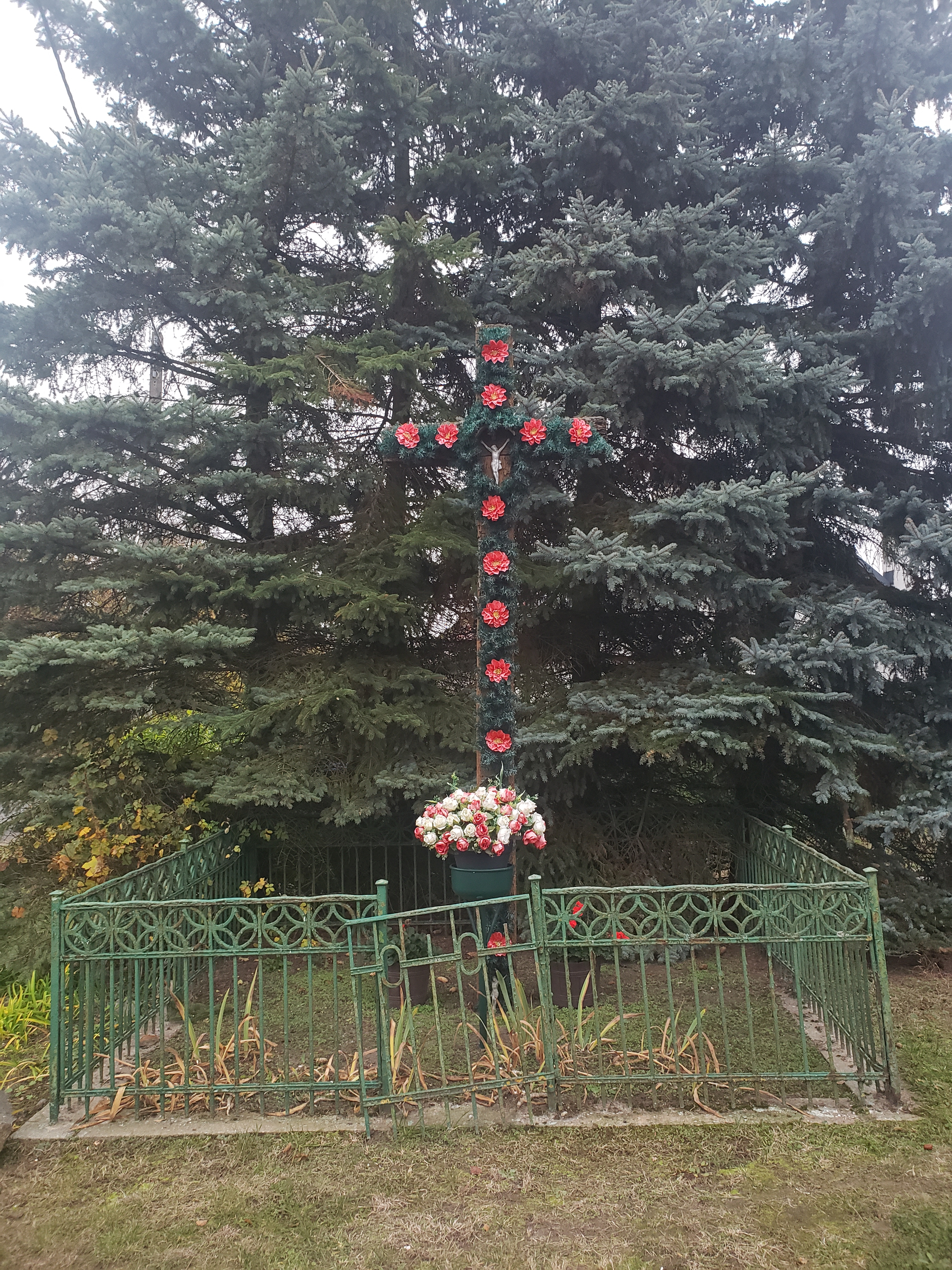
Cross at the entry road into Renice proper

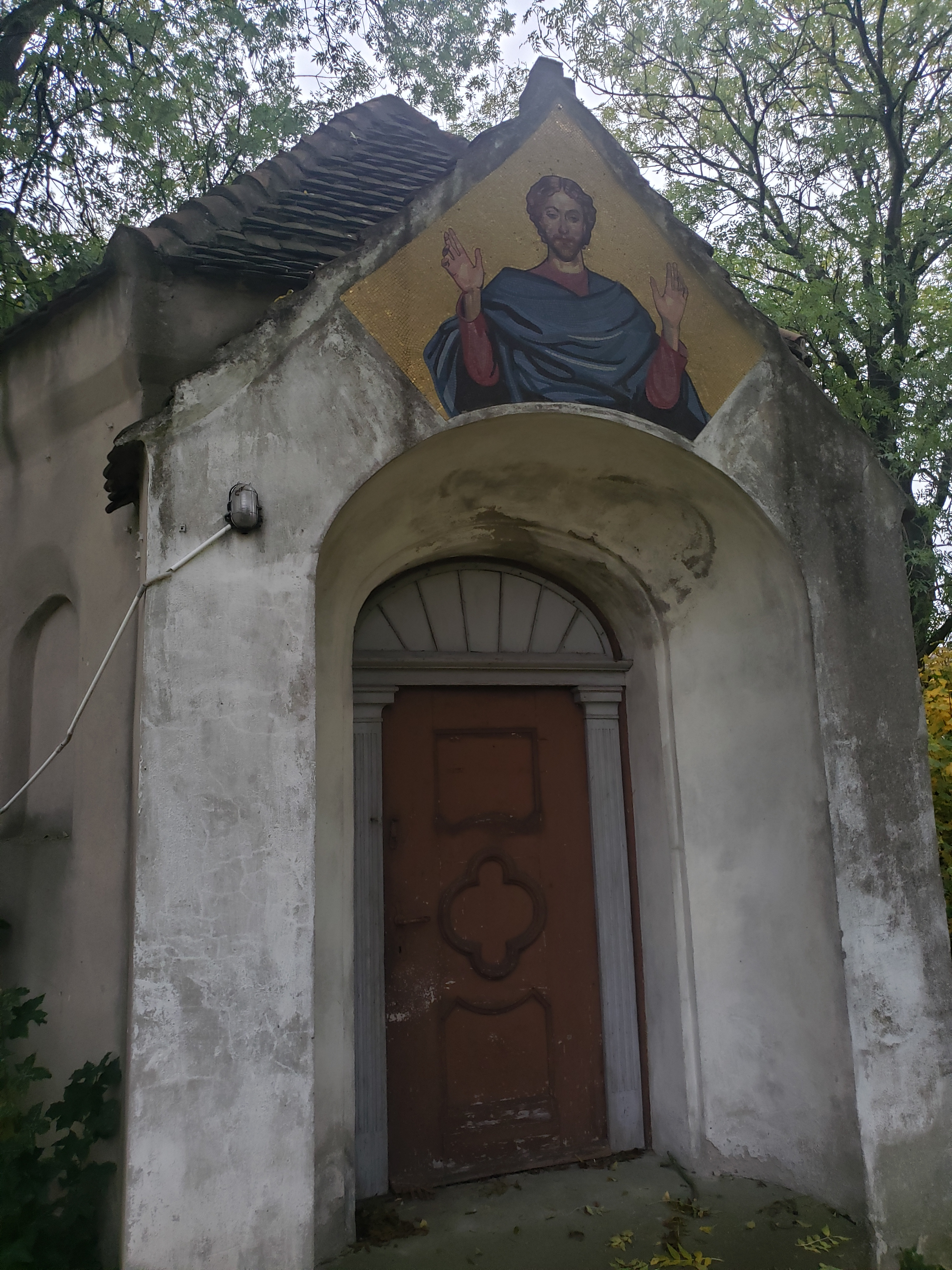
Chapel on the church grounds with mural

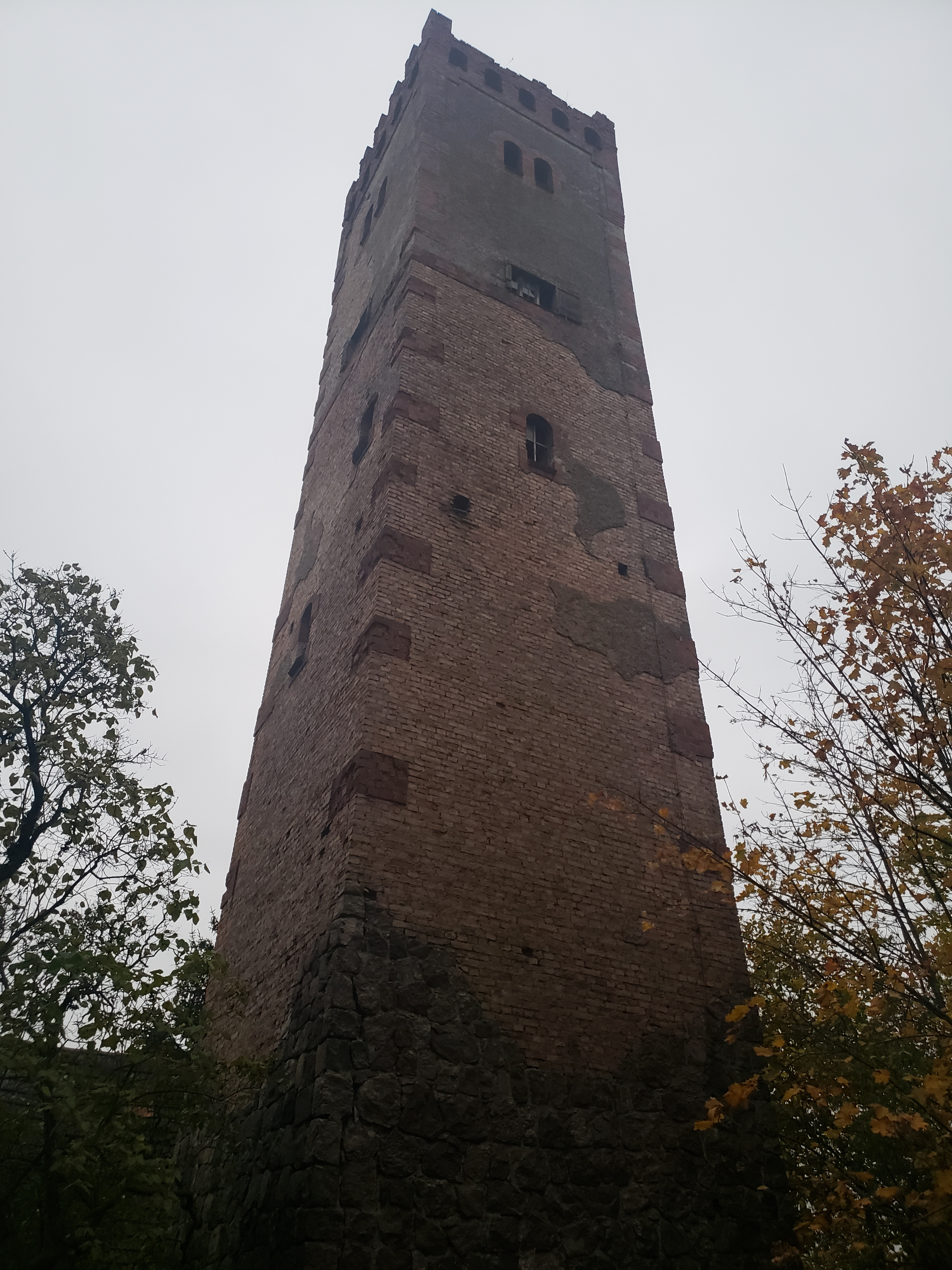
Water tower

== Notable people ==
- Hugo Oppenheim (1848–1921), lived in Rehnitz (now Renice) and owned the estate and palace from 1909 until his death

== Bibliography ==
- Skaziński, Błażej (2022). Rehnitz/Renice (Schlösser und Gärten der Neumark). hendrik Bäßler verlag · berlin. ISBN 978-3-945880-95-1
