= Dąbrowa (Rościn) =

- Settlement
- Location within Poland
- Coordinates: 52°52′14″N 14°49′08″E
- Country: Poland
- Voivodeship: West Pomeranian
- County: Myślibórz
- Gmina: Myślibórz

Dąbrowa [dɔmˈbrɔva] is a settlement in the administrative district of Gmina Myślibórz, within Myślibórz County, West Pomeranian Voivodeship, in north-western Poland. It is part of the sołectwo of Rościn.
