= Kolonia Myśliborzyce =

- Village
- Location within Poland
- Coordinates: 52°53′19″N 14°53′50″E
- Country: Poland
- Voivodeship: West Pomeranian
- County: Myślibórz
- Gmina: Myślibórz

Kolonia Myśliborzyce [kɔˈlɔɲa mɨɕlibɔˈʐɨt͡sɛ] is a village in the administrative district of Gmina Myślibórz, within Myślibórz County, West Pomeranian Voivodeship, in north-western Poland.
