= Krusze, West Pomeranian Voivodeship =

Krusze
- Village
- Location within Poland
- Coordinates: 53°00′56″N 14°44′42″E
- Country: Poland
- Voivodeship: West Pomeranian
- County: Myślibórz
- Gmina: Myślibórz

Krusze [ˈkruʂɛ] is a village in the administrative district of Gmina Myślibórz, within Myślibórz County, West Pomeranian Voivodeship, in north-western Poland.
