= Golenice =

- Village
- Location within Poland
- Coordinates: 52°56′N 14°47′E
- Country: Poland
- Voivodeship: West Pomeranian
- County: Myślibórz
- Gmina: Myślibórz
- Population: 1,000

Golenice [ɡɔlɛˈnit͡sɛ] (German: Schildberg) is a village in the administrative district of Gmina Myślibórz, within Myślibórz County, West Pomeranian Voivodeship, in north-western Poland. It lies approximately 6 km (4 mi) west of Myślibórz and 56 km (35 mi) south of the regional capital Szczecin.

For the history of the region, see the History of Pomerania.

The village has a population of 1,000.
