= Zgoda, West Pomeranian Voivodeship =

Zgoda
- Village
- Location within Poland
- Coordinates: 52°55′32″N 14°49′13″E
- Country: Poland
- Voivodeship: West Pomeranian
- County: Myślibórz
- Gmina: Myślibórz

Zgoda [ˈzɡɔda] (German: Louisenthal) is a village in the administrative district of Gmina Myślibórz, within Myślibórz County, West Pomeranian Voivodeship, in north-western Poland.

For the history of the region, see History of Pomerania.
