= Bierzwnik =

Bierzwnik may refer to the following places in West Pomeranian Voivodeship, Poland:

- Bierzwnik, Choszczno County
- Bierzwnik, Myślibórz County
