= Bucznik, West Pomeranian Voivodeship =

Bucznik
- Former settlement
- Location within Poland
- Coordinates: 52°59′18″N 14°49′46″E
- Country: Poland
- Voivodeship: West Pomeranian
- County: Myślibórz
- Gmina: Myślibórz
- Time zone: UTC+01:00 (CET)
  - Summer (DST): UTC+02:00 (CEST)

Bucznik [ˈbut͡ʂnik] (German: Buchheide) is a former settlement in the administrative district of Gmina Myślibórz, within Myślibórz County, West Pomeranian Voivodeship, in north-western Poland.

For the history of the region, see History of Pomerania.
