= Pniów, West Pomeranian Voivodeship =

Pniów
- Village
- Location within Poland
- Coordinates: 52°54′N 14°45′E
- Country: Poland
- Voivodeship: West Pomeranian
- County: Myślibórz
- Gmina: Myślibórz

Pniów [pɲuf] (German: Pinnow) is a village in the administrative district of Gmina Myślibórz, within Myślibórz County, West Pomeranian Voivodeship, in north-western Poland. It lies approximately 9 km (6 mi) south-west of Myślibórz and 59 km (37 mi) south of the regional capital Szczecin.

For the history of the region, see History of Pomerania.
