= Pacynowo =

- Settlement
- Location within Poland
- Coordinates: 52°57′19″N 14°48′14″E
- Country: Poland
- Voivodeship: West Pomeranian
- County: Myślibórz
- Gmina: Myślibórz

Pacynowo [pat͡sɨˈnɔvɔ] (German: Ahrensburg) is a settlement in the administrative district of Gmina Myślibórz, within Myślibórz County, West Pomeranian Voivodeship, in north-western Poland.

For the history of the region, see History of Pomerania.
