= Chłopowo =

Chłopowo may refer to the following places:

- Chłopowo, Choszczno County in West Pomeranian Voivodeship (north-west Poland)
- Chłopowo, Myślibórz County in West Pomeranian Voivodeship (north-west Poland)
- Chłopowo, Szczecinek County in West Pomeranian Voivodeship (north-west Poland)
