= Sadkowo =

Sadkowo may refer to the following places in Poland:

- Sadkowo, Masovian Voivodeship
- Sadkowo, West Pomeranian Voivodeship
- Sądkowo, West Pomeranian Voivodeship
