= Jezierzyce, Myślibórz County =

Jezierzyce
- Village
- Location within Poland
- Coordinates: 52°58′47″N 14°48′24″E
- Country: Poland
- Voivodeship: West Pomeranian
- County: Myślibórz
- Gmina: Myślibórz
- Population: 10

Jezierzyce [jɛʑɛˈʐɨt͡sɛ] (German: Karlshof) is a village in the administrative district of Gmina Myślibórz, within Myślibórz County, West Pomeranian Voivodeship, in north-western Poland. It lies approximately 7 km (4 mi) north-west of Myślibórz and 51 km (32 mi) south of the regional capital Szczecin.

For the history of the region, see History of Pomerania.

The village has a population of 10.
