= Straszyn =

Straszyn may refer to the following places in Poland:

- Straszyn, Pomeranian Voivodeship
- Straszyn, West Pomeranian Voivodeship
