= Podławie =

- Village
- Location within Poland
- Coordinates: 52°53′14″N 14°57′19″E
- Country: Poland
- Voivodeship: West Pomeranian
- County: Myślibórz
- Gmina: Myślibórz

Podławie [pɔdˈwavjɛ] is a village in the administrative district of Gmina Myślibórz, within Myślibórz County, West Pomeranian Voivodeship, in north-western Poland.
