= Chłopówko =

Chłopówko may refer to the following places in West Pomeranian Voivodeship, Poland:

- Chłopówko, Myślibórz County
- Chłopówko, Szczecinek County
