= Otanów =

- Village
- Location within Poland
- Coordinates: 52°59′N 14°52′E
- Country: Poland
- Voivodeship: West Pomeranian
- County: Myślibórz
- Gmina: Myślibórz
- Population: 240

Otanów [ɔˈtanuf] (German: Wuthenow) is a village in the administrative district of Gmina Myślibórz, within Myślibórz County, West Pomeranian Voivodeship, in north-western Poland. It lies approximately 6 km (4 mi) north of Myślibórz and 52 km (32 mi) south of the regional capital Szczecin.

For the history of the region, see History of Pomerania.

The village has a population of 240.
