= Czerników, West Pomeranian Voivodeship =

Czerników
- Village
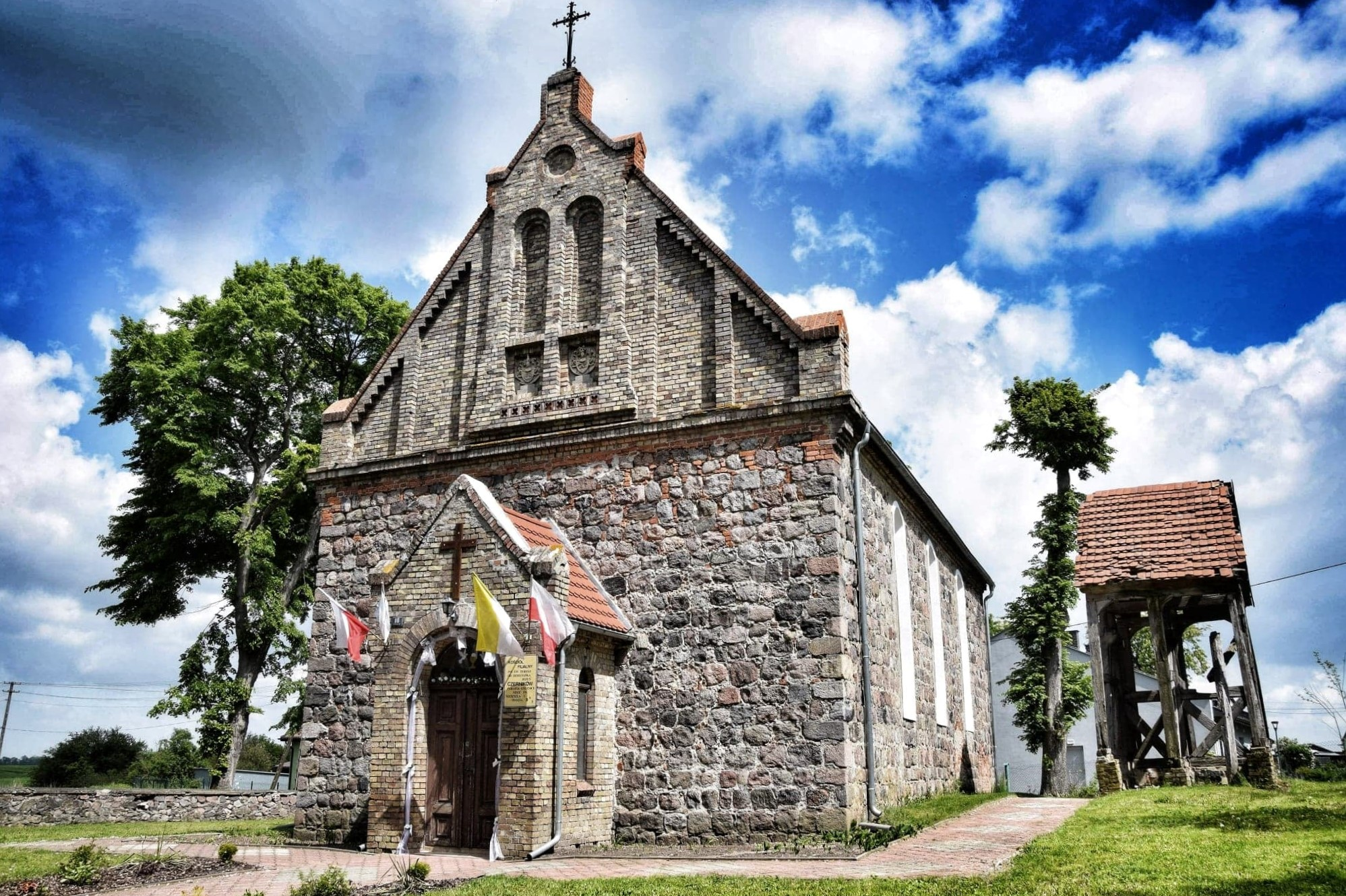
- Saint Thérèse church in Czerników

- Location within Poland
- Coordinates: 52°55′N 14°45′E
- Country: Poland
- Voivodeship: West Pomeranian
- County: Myślibórz
- Gmina: Myślibórz
- Time zone: UTC+1 (CET)
  - Summer (DST): UTC+2 (CEST)
- Vehicle registration: ZMY

Czerników [t͡ʂɛrˈnikuf] is a village in the administrative district of Gmina Myślibórz, within Myślibórz County, West Pomeranian Voivodeship, in north-western Poland. It lies approximately 9 km (6 mi) west of Myślibórz and 57 km (35 mi) south of the regional capital Szczecin.

It is located in the historic region of Pomerania.
