= Nawrocko =

- Village
- Location within Poland
- Coordinates: 52°54′N 14°48′E
- Country: Poland
- Voivodeship: West Pomeranian
- County: Myślibórz
- Gmina: Myślibórz

Nawrocko [naˈvrɔt͡skɔ] (German: Liebenfelde) is a village in the administrative district of Gmina Myślibórz, within Myślibórz County, West Pomeranian Voivodeship, in north-western Poland. It lies approximately 6 km (4 mi) south-west of Myślibórz and 60 km (37 mi) south of the regional capital Szczecin.
