= Czeczewo, West Pomeranian Voivodeship =

Czeczewo
- Village
- Location within Poland
- Coordinates: 53°0′38″N 14°45′19″E
- Country: Poland
- Voivodeship: West Pomeranian
- County: Myślibórz
- Gmina: Myślibórz
- Population: 30

Czeczewo [t͡ʂɛˈt͡ʂɛvɔ] (formerly German Rotharm) is a village in the administrative district of Gmina Myślibórz, within Myślibórz County, West Pomeranian Voivodeship, in north-western Poland. It lies approximately 12 km (7 mi) north-west of Myślibórz and 47 km (29 mi) south of the regional capital Szczecin.

For the history of the region, see History of Pomerania.

The village has a population of 30.
