= Krężel, Myślibórz County =

Krężel
- Settlement
- Location within Poland
- Coordinates: 52°57′57″N 15°02′04″E
- Country: Poland
- Voivodeship: West Pomeranian
- County: Myślibórz
- Gmina: Myślibórz

Krężel [ˈkrɛ̃ʐɛl] (German: Lindehof) is a settlement in the administrative district of Gmina Myślibórz, within Myślibórz County, West Pomeranian Voivodeship, in north-western Poland.

For the history of the region, see History of Pomerania.
