= Sobienice =

- Settlement
- Location within Poland
- Coordinates: 52°55′48″N 14°49′40″E
- Country: Poland
- Voivodeship: West Pomeranian
- County: Myślibórz
- Gmina: Myślibórz

Sobienice [sɔbjɛˈnit͡sɛ] (German: Sophienstein) is a settlement in the administrative district of Gmina Myślibórz, within Myślibórz County, West Pomeranian Voivodeship, in north-western Poland. It lies approximately 3 km (2 mi) west of Myślibórz and 57 km (35 mi) south of the regional capital Szczecin.

For the history of the region, see History of Pomerania.
