= Sicienko, Myślibórz County =

Sicienko
- Settlement
- Location within Poland
- Coordinates: 53°00′46″N 14°52′26″E
- Country: Poland
- Voivodeship: West Pomeranian
- County: Myślibórz
- Gmina: Myślibórz

Sicienko [ɕiˈt͡ɕɛnkɔ] (German: Klein Profitchen) is a settlement in the administrative district of Gmina Myślibórz, within Myślibórz County, West Pomeranian Voivodeship, in northwestern Poland.

For the history of the region, see History of Pomerania.
