= Chełmsko, West Pomeranian Voivodeship =

Chełmsko
- Settlement
- Location within Poland
- Coordinates: 52°58′34″N 15°01′17″E
- Country: Poland
- Voivodeship: West Pomeranian
- County: Myślibórz
- Gmina: Myślibórz

Chełmsko [ˈxɛu̯mskɔ] (German: Gollmütz) is a settlement in the administrative district of Gmina Myślibórz, within Myślibórz County, West Pomeranian Voivodeship, in north-western Poland.

For the history of the region, see History of Pomerania.
