= Jarużyn =

Jarużyn may refer to the following places in Poland:

- Jarużyn, Kuyavian-Pomeranian Voivodeship
- Jarużyn, West Pomeranian Voivodeship
- Jarużyn-Kolonia
