= Listomie =

- Village
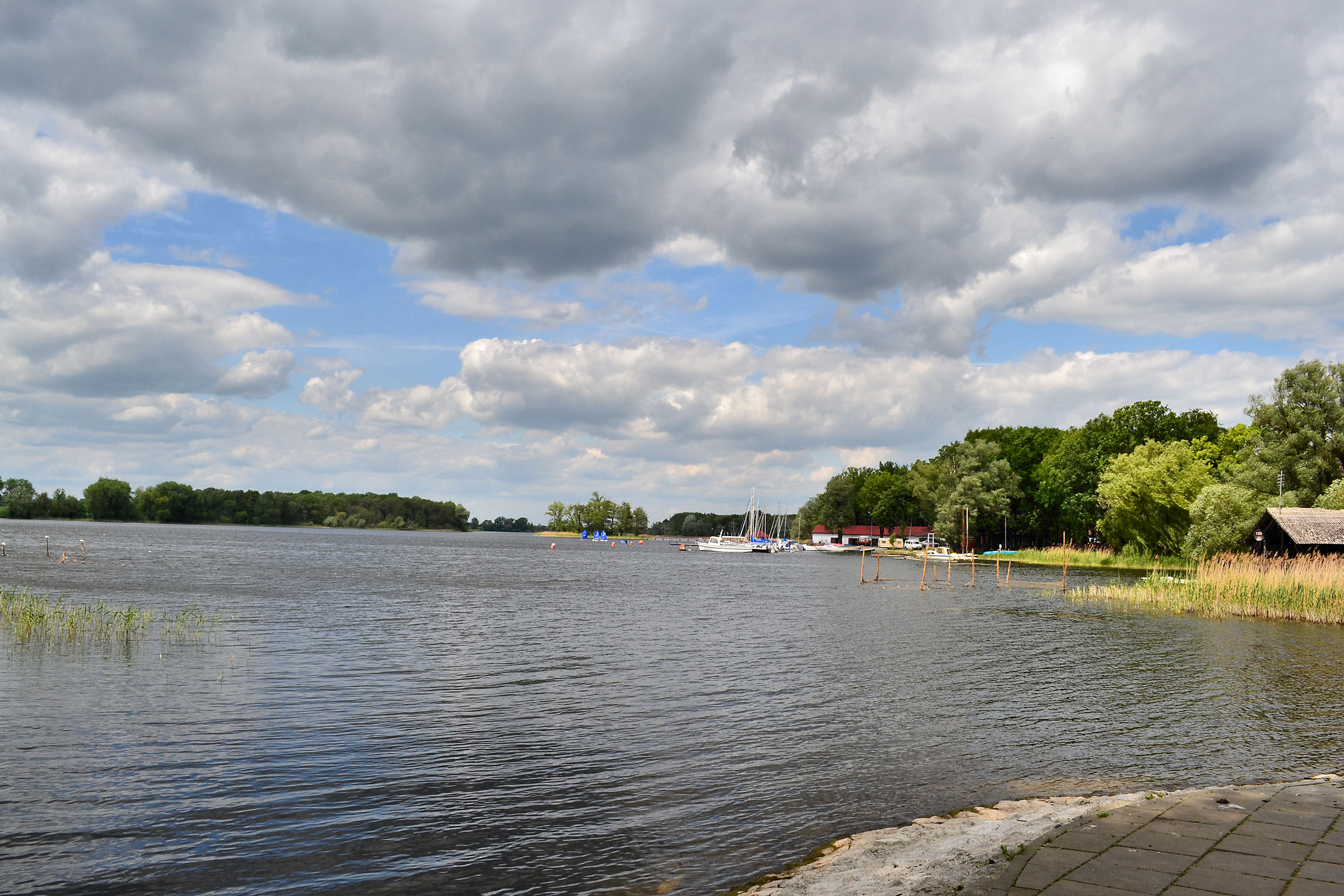

- Location within Poland
- Coordinates: 52°56′26″N 14°49′38″E
- Country: Poland
- Voivodeship: West Pomeranian
- County: Myślibórz
- Gmina: Myślibórz

Listomie [lisˈtɔmjɛ] is a village in the administrative district of Gmina Myślibórz, within Myślibórz County, West Pomeranian Voivodeship, in north-western Poland.
