= Zarzecze, West Pomeranian Voivodeship =

Zarzecze
- Settlement
- Location within Poland
- Coordinates: 52°52′19″N 14°53′25″E
- Country: Poland
- Voivodeship: West Pomeranian
- County: Myślibórz
- Gmina: Myślibórz

Zarzecze [zaˈʐɛt͡ʂɛ] is a settlement in the administrative district of Gmina Myślibórz, within Myślibórz County, West Pomeranian Voivodeship, in north-western Poland.
