= Tarnowo, Myślibórz County =

Tarnowo
- Village
- Location within Poland
- Coordinates: 52°59′34″N 14°49′11″E
- Country: Poland
- Voivodeship: West Pomeranian
- County: Myślibórz
- Gmina: Myślibórz

Tarnowo [tarˈnɔvɔ] (German: Justinenhof) is a village in the administrative district of Gmina Myślibórz, within Myślibórz County, West Pomeranian Voivodeship, in north-western Poland.

For the history of the region, see History of Pomerania.
