= Rów, West Pomeranian Voivodeship =

Rów
- Village
- Location within Poland
- Coordinates: 52°59′N 14°43′E
- Country: Poland
- Voivodeship: West Pomeranian
- County: Myślibórz
- Gmina: Myślibórz

Rów [ruf] (German: Rufen) is a village in the administrative district of Gmina Myślibórz, within Myślibórz County, West Pomeranian Voivodeship, in north-western Poland. It lies approximately 12 km (7 mi) north-west of Myślibórz and 49 km (30 mi) south of the regional capital Szczecin.

For the history of the region, see History of Pomerania.
