= Dalsze =

- Village
- Location within Poland
- Coordinates: 52°52′N 14°51′E
- Country: Poland
- Voivodeship: West Pomeranian
- County: Myślibórz
- Gmina: Myślibórz

Dalsze [ˈdalʂɛ] (German: Woltersdorf) is a village in the administrative district of Gmina Myślibórz, within Myślibórz County, West Pomeranian Voivodeship, in north-western Poland. It lies approximately 8 km (5 mi) south of Myślibórz and 64 km (40 mi) south of the regional capital Szczecin.

For the history of the region, see History of Pomerania.
