= Przymiarki, Gmina Myślibórz =

Przymiarki
- Settlement
- Location within Poland
- Coordinates: 52°58′50″N 14°49′40″E
- Country: Poland
- Voivodeship: West Pomeranian
- County: Myślibórz
- Gmina: Myślibórz

Przymiarki [pʂɨˈmjarki] is a settlement in the administrative district of Gmina Myślibórz, within Myślibórz County, West Pomeranian Voivodeship, in north-western Poland.
