= Derczewo =

- Village
- Location within Poland
- Coordinates: 53°2′N 14°53′E
- Country: Poland
- Voivodeship: West Pomeranian
- County: Myślibórz
- Gmina: Myślibórz

Derczewo [dɛrˈt͡ʂɛvɔ] (German: Dertzow) is a village in the administrative district of Gmina Myślibórz, within Myślibórz County, West Pomeranian Voivodeship, in north-western Poland. It lies approximately 12 km (7 mi) north of Myślibórz and 47 km (29 mi) south-east of the regional capital Szczecin.

For the history of the region, see History of Pomerania.
