= Niesłusz =

- Settlement
- Location within Poland
- Coordinates: 53°00′55″N 14°44′15″E
- Country: Poland
- Voivodeship: West Pomeranian
- County: Myślibórz
- Gmina: Myślibórz

Niesłusz [ˈɲɛswuʂ] is a settlement in the administrative district of Gmina Myślibórz, within Myślibórz County, West Pomeranian Voivodeship, in north-western Poland.
