= Golzow (disambiguation) =

Golzow is a municipality in the district of Märkish-Oderland, Brandenburg, Germany

Golzow may also refer to:

- Golzow, Potsdam-Mittelmark, a municipality in the district of Potsdam-Mittelmark, Brandenburg
- Golzow (Chorin), a village in the municipality of Chorin, Barnim district, Brandenburg
- Amt Golzow, a collective municipality in the district of Märkish-Oderland, Brandenburg
- Golczew, village in Myślibórz County, West Pomeranian Voivodeship, in north-western Poland
