= Wydmuchy =

- Settlement
- Location within Poland
- Coordinates: 52°57′14″N 14°56′04″E
- Country: Poland
- Voivodeship: West Pomeranian
- County: Myślibórz
- Gmina: Myślibórz

Wydmuchy [vɨdˈmuxɨ] is a settlement in the administrative district of Gmina Myślibórz, within Myślibórz County, West Pomeranian Voivodeship, in north-western Poland.
