= Sulimierz =

Sulimierz may refer to the following places in Poland:

- Sulimierz, Lower Silesian Voivodeship (south-west Poland, formerly known as Neudorf-Sulau in German)
- Sulimierz, West Pomeranian Voivodeship (north-west Poland, formerly known as Adamsdorf in German)
