= Wierzbówek =

- Village
- Location within Poland
- Coordinates: 52°53′53″N 14°52′44″E
- Country: Poland
- Voivodeship: West Pomeranian
- County: Myślibórz
- Gmina: Myślibórz
- Population: 458
- Website: http://wierzbówek.pl

Wierzbówek [vjɛʐˈbuvɛk] is a village in the administrative district of Gmina Myślibórz, within Myślibórz County, West Pomeranian Voivodeship, in north-western Poland.

The village has a population of 458.
