= Sitno, Gmina Myślibórz =

Sitno
- Village
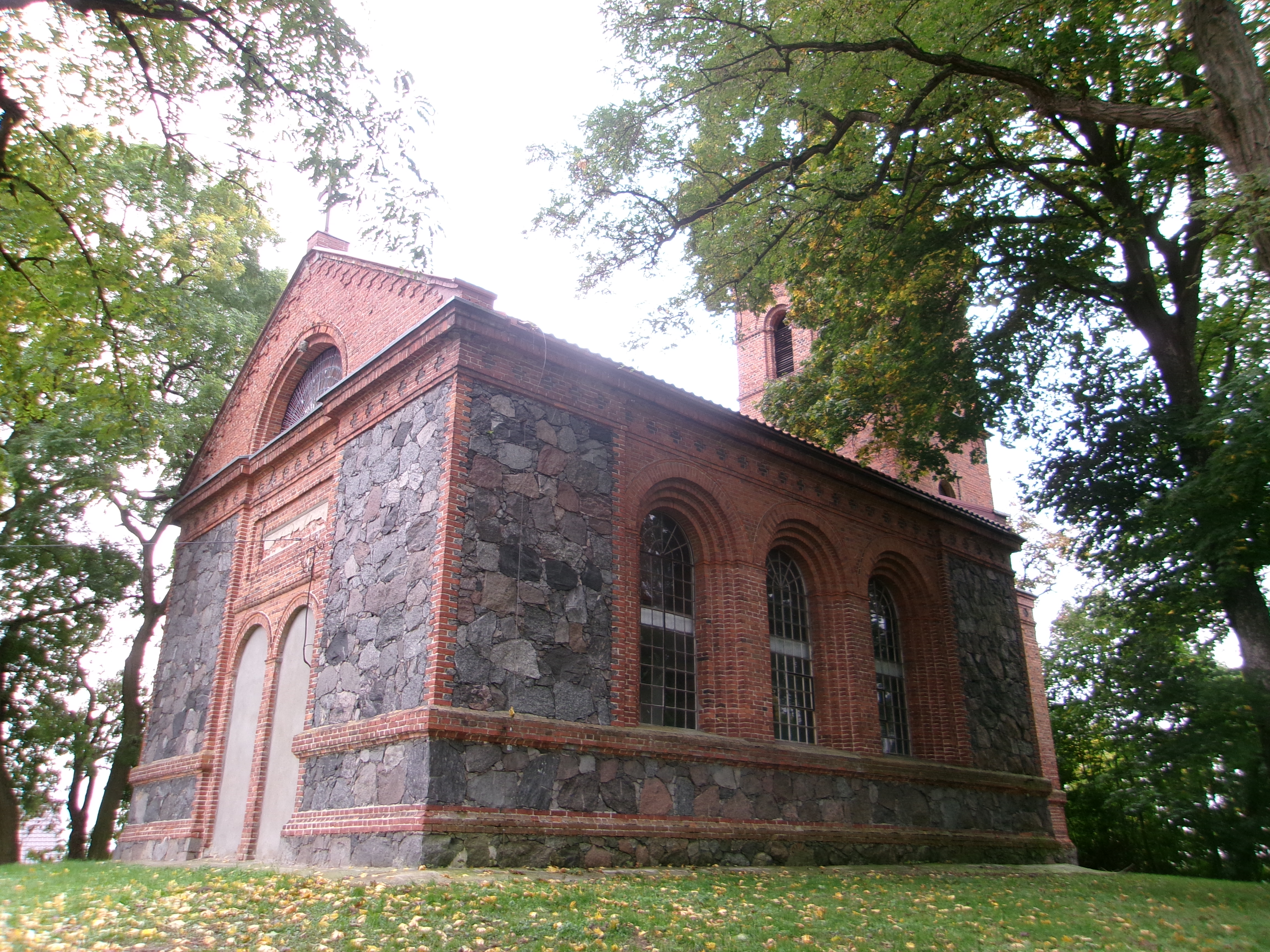
- Saint Andrew Bobola church in Sitno

- Location within Poland
- Coordinates: 53°01′56″N 14°51′01″E
- Country: Poland
- Voivodeship: West Pomeranian
- County: Myślibórz
- Gmina: Myślibórz
- Time zone: UTC+1 (CET)
  - Summer (DST): UTC+2 (CEST)
- Vehicle registration: ZMY

Sitno [ˈɕitnɔ] (German: Hohenziethen) is a village in the administrative district of Gmina Myślibórz, within Myślibórz County, West Pomeranian Voivodeship, in north-western Poland.
