= Dzieżgów =

- Village
- Location within Poland
- Coordinates: 52°58′40″N 14°58′39″E
- Country: Poland
- Voivodeship: West Pomeranian
- County: Myślibórz
- Gmina: Myślibórz

Dzieżgów [ˈd͡ʑɛʐɡuf] is a village in the administrative district of Gmina Myślibórz, within Myślibórz County, West Pomeranian Voivodeship, in north-western Poland. It lies approximately 9 km (6 mi) north-east of Myślibórz and 56 km (35 mi) south-east of the regional capital Szczecin.
