= Odolanów, West Pomeranian Voivodeship =

Odolanów
- Settlement
- Location within Poland
- Coordinates: 52°58′13″N 15°02′36″E
- Country: Poland
- Voivodeship: West Pomeranian
- County: Myślibórz
- Gmina: Myślibórz
- Time zone: UTC+1 (CET)
  - Summer (DST): UTC+2 (CEST)
- Vehicle registration: ZMY

Odolanów [ɔdɔˈlanuf] (German: Adamsdorfer Feld) is a settlement in the administrative district of Gmina Myślibórz, within Myślibórz County, West Pomeranian Voivodeship, in north-western Poland.
