= Zgnilec, West Pomeranian Voivodeship =

Zgnilec
- Settlement
- Location within Poland
- Coordinates: 52°57′57″N 14°58′02″E
- Country: Poland
- Voivodeship: West Pomeranian
- County: Myślibórz
- Gmina: Myślibórz

Zgnilec [ˈzɡnilɛt͡s] is a settlement in the administrative district of Gmina Myślibórz, within Myślibórz County, West Pomeranian Voivodeship, in north-western Poland.
