= Wierzbnica =

Wierzbnica may refer to the following places in Poland

- Wierzbnica, Lubusz Voivodeship
- Wierzbnica, West Pomeranian Voivodeship
