= Iłowo, West Pomeranian Voivodeship =

Iłowo
- Settlement
- Location within Poland
- Coordinates: 52°54′17″N 14°47′08″E
- Country: Poland
- Voivodeship: West Pomeranian
- County: Myślibórz
- Gmina: Myślibórz

Iłowo [iˈwɔvɔ] (German: Ihlowshof) is a settlement in the administrative district of Gmina Myślibórz, within Myślibórz County, West Pomeranian Voivodeship, in north-western Poland.

For the history of the region, see History of Pomerania.
