= Dąbrowa, Gmina Myślibórz =

Dąbrowa
- Village
- Location within Poland
- Coordinates: 52°57′N 14°52′E
- Country: Poland
- Voivodeship: West Pomeranian
- County: Myślibórz
- Gmina: Myślibórz

Dąbrowa [dɔmˈbrɔva] (German: Eichwerder) is a village in the administrative district of Gmina Myślibórz, within Myślibórz County, West Pomeranian Voivodeship, in north-western Poland. It lies approximately 2 km (1 mi) north of Myślibórz and 56 km (35 mi) south of the regional capital Szczecin.

For the history of the region, see History of Pomerania.
