= Kruszwin =

- Village
- Location within Poland
- Coordinates: 52°57′N 14°50′E
- Country: Poland
- Voivodeship: West Pomeranian
- County: Myślibórz
- Gmina: Myślibórz

Kruszwin [ˈkruʂfin] (German: Simonsdorf) is a village in the administrative district of Gmina Myślibórz, within Myślibórz County, West Pomeranian Voivodeship, in north-western Poland. It lies approximately 3 km (2 mi) north-west of Myślibórz and 55 km (34 mi) south of the regional capital Szczecin.

For the history of the region, see History of Pomerania.
