= Myśliborzyce, West Pomeranian Voivodeship =

Myśliborzyce
- Village
- Location within Poland
- Coordinates: 52°54′N 14°52′E
- Country: Poland
- Voivodeship: West Pomeranian
- County: Myślibórz
- Gmina: Myślibórz

Myśliborzyce [mɨɕlibɔˈʐɨt͡sɛ] (German: Mietzelfelde) is a village in the administrative district of Gmina Myślibórz, within Myślibórz County, West Pomeranian Voivodeship, in north-western Poland. It lies approximately 4 km (2 mi) south of Myślibórz and 61 km (38 mi) south of the regional capital Szczecin.

For the history of the region, see History of Pomerania.
