= Straszyn, West Pomeranian Voivodeship =

Straszyn
- Settlement
- Location within Poland
- Coordinates: 52°57′23″N 14°48′38″E
- Country: Poland
- Voivodeship: West Pomeranian
- County: Myślibórz
- Gmina: Myślibórz

Straszyn [ˈstraʂɨn] is a settlement in the administrative district of Gmina Myślibórz, within Myślibórz County, West Pomeranian Voivodeship, in north-western Poland.
