= Rościn, Myślibórz County =

Rościn
- Village
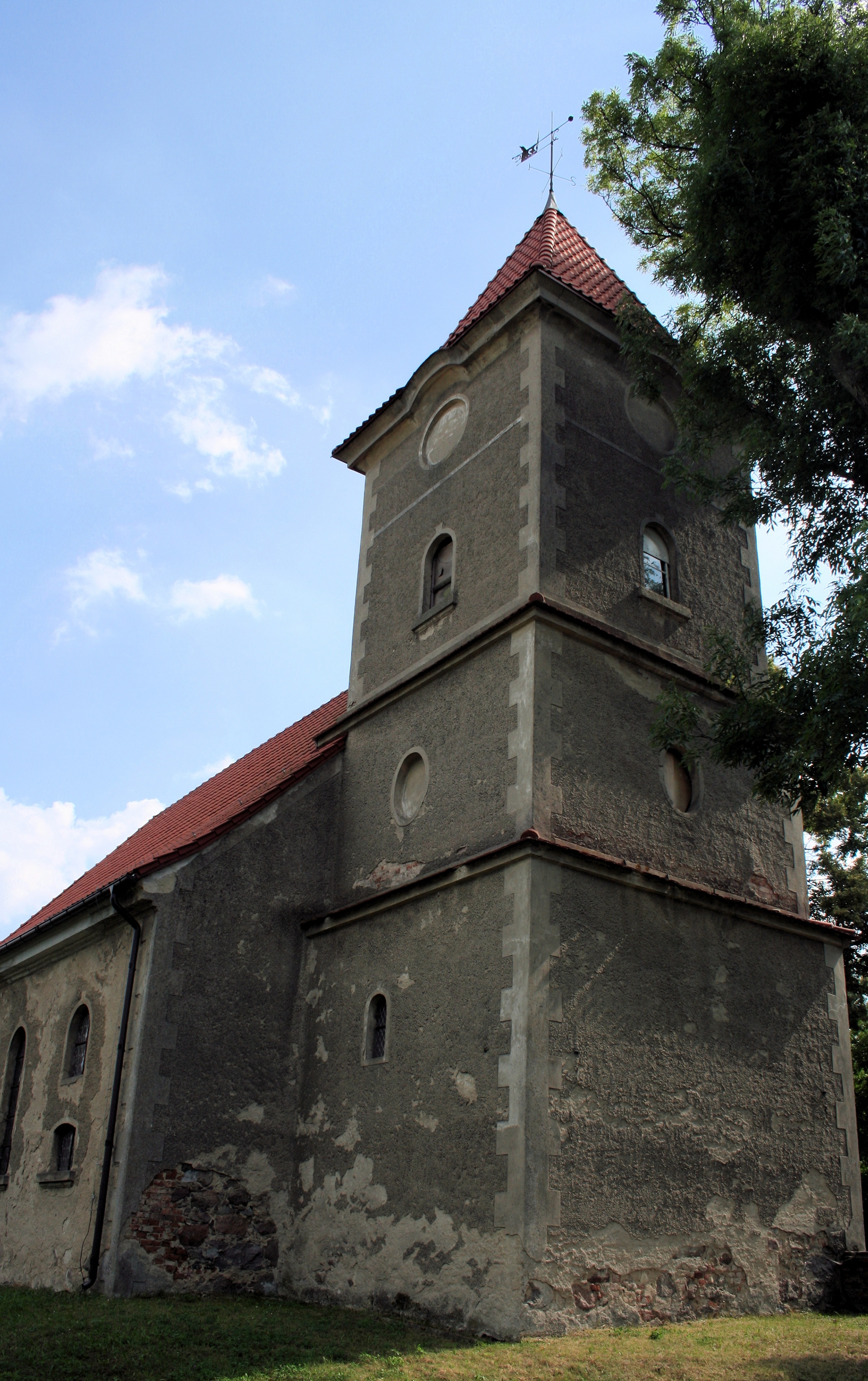
- Saint Roch church in Rościn

- Location within Poland
- Coordinates: 52°53′N 14°48′E
- Country: Poland
- Voivodeship: West Pomeranian
- County: Myślibórz
- Gmina: Myślibórz
- Time zone: UTC+1 (CET)
  - Summer (DST): UTC+2 (CEST)
- Vehicle registration: ZMY

Rościn [ˈrɔɕt͡ɕin] is a village in the administrative district of Gmina Myślibórz, within Myślibórz County, West Pomeranian Voivodeship, in north-western Poland. It lies approximately 8 km (5 mi) south-west of Myślibórz and 61 km (38 mi) south of the regional capital Szczecin.
