= Wierzbnica, West Pomeranian Voivodeship =

Wierzbnica
- Village
- Location within Poland
- Coordinates: 52°54′41″N 14°51′19″E
- Country: Poland
- Voivodeship: West Pomeranian
- County: Myślibórz
- Gmina: Myślibórz

Wierzbnica [vjɛʐbˈnit͡sa] is a village in the administrative district of Gmina Myślibórz, within Myślibórz County, West Pomeranian Voivodeship, in north-western Poland.
