= Głazów, West Pomeranian Voivodeship =

Głazów
- Village
- Location within Poland
- Coordinates: 52°57′N 14°58′E
- Country: Poland
- Voivodeship: West Pomeranian
- County: Myślibórz
- Gmina: Myślibórz

Głazów [ˈɡwazuf] (German: Glasow) is a village in the administrative district of Gmina Myślibórz, within Myślibórz County, West Pomeranian Voivodeship, in north-western Poland. It lies approximately 7 km (4 mi) east of Myślibórz and 58 km (36 mi) south-east of the regional capital Szczecin.

For the history of the region, see History of Pomerania.
