= Chłopowo, Myślibórz County =

Chłopowo
- Village
- Location within Poland
- Coordinates: 52°53′N 14°43′E
- Country: Poland
- Voivodeship: West Pomeranian
- County: Myślibórz
- Gmina: Myślibórz
- Population (approx.): 300

Chłopowo [xwɔˈpɔvɔ] (German: Herrendorf) is a village in the administrative district of Gmina Myślibórz, within Myślibórz County, West Pomeranian Voivodeship, in north-western Poland. It lies approximately 12 km (7 mi) south-west of Myślibórz and 60 km (37 mi) south of the regional capital Szczecin.

For the history of the region, see History of Pomerania.

The village has an approximate population of 300.
