= Pluty, West Pomeranian Voivodeship =

Pluty
- Settlement
- Location within Poland
- Coordinates: 52°54′25″N 14°55′39″E
- Country: Poland
- Voivodeship: West Pomeranian
- County: Myślibórz
- Gmina: Myślibórz

Pluty [ˈplutɨ] is a settlement in the administrative district of Gmina Myślibórz, within Myślibórz County, West Pomeranian Voivodeship, in north-western Poland.
