= Bierzwnik, Myślibórz County =

Bierzwnik
- Former settlement
- Location within Poland
- Coordinates: 53°02′01″N 14°54′16″E
- Country: Poland
- Voivodeship: West Pomeranian
- County: Myślibórz
- Gmina: Myślibórz

Bierzwnik [ˈbjɛʐvnik] (German: Jägerswalde) is a former settlement in the administrative district of Gmina Myślibórz, within Myślibórz County, West Pomeranian Voivodeship, in north-western Poland.

For the history of the region, see History of Pomerania.
