= Chłopówko, Myślibórz County =

Chłopówko
- Settlement
- Location within Poland
- Coordinates: 52°52′51″N 14°44′27″E
- Country: Poland
- Voivodeship: West Pomeranian
- County: Myślibórz
- Gmina: Myślibórz

Chłopówko [xwɔˈpufkɔ] is a settlement in the administrative district of Gmina Myślibórz, which is within Myślibórz County, West Pomeranian Voivodeship, in north-western Poland.
