= Golczew =

- Village
- Location within Poland
- Coordinates (Golczew): 52°57′22″N 14°45′25″E
- Country: Poland
- Voivodeship: West Pomeranian
- County: Myślibórz
- Gmina: Myślibórz
- Time zone: UTC+01:00 (CET)
  - Summer (DST): UTC+02:00 (CEST)

Golczew [ˈɡɔlt͡ʂɛf] is a village in the administrative district of Gmina Myślibórz, within Myślibórz County, West Pomeranian Voivodeship, in north-western Poland.
