= Sulimierz, West Pomeranian Voivodeship =

Sulimierz
- Village
- Location within Poland
- Coordinates: 52°58′3″N 15°0′44″E
- Country: Poland
- Voivodeship: West Pomeranian
- County: Myślibórz
- Gmina: Myślibórz
- Population: 740

Sulimierz [suˈlimjɛʂ] (formerly German Adamsdorf) is a village in the administrative district of Gmina Myślibórz, within Myślibórz County, West Pomeranian Voivodeship, in north-western Poland. It lies approximately 11 km (7 mi) east of Myślibórz and 58 km (36 mi) south-east of the regional capital Szczecin.

For the history of the region, see History of Pomerania.

The village has a population of 740.
