= Ławy, West Pomeranian Voivodeship =

Ławy
- Village
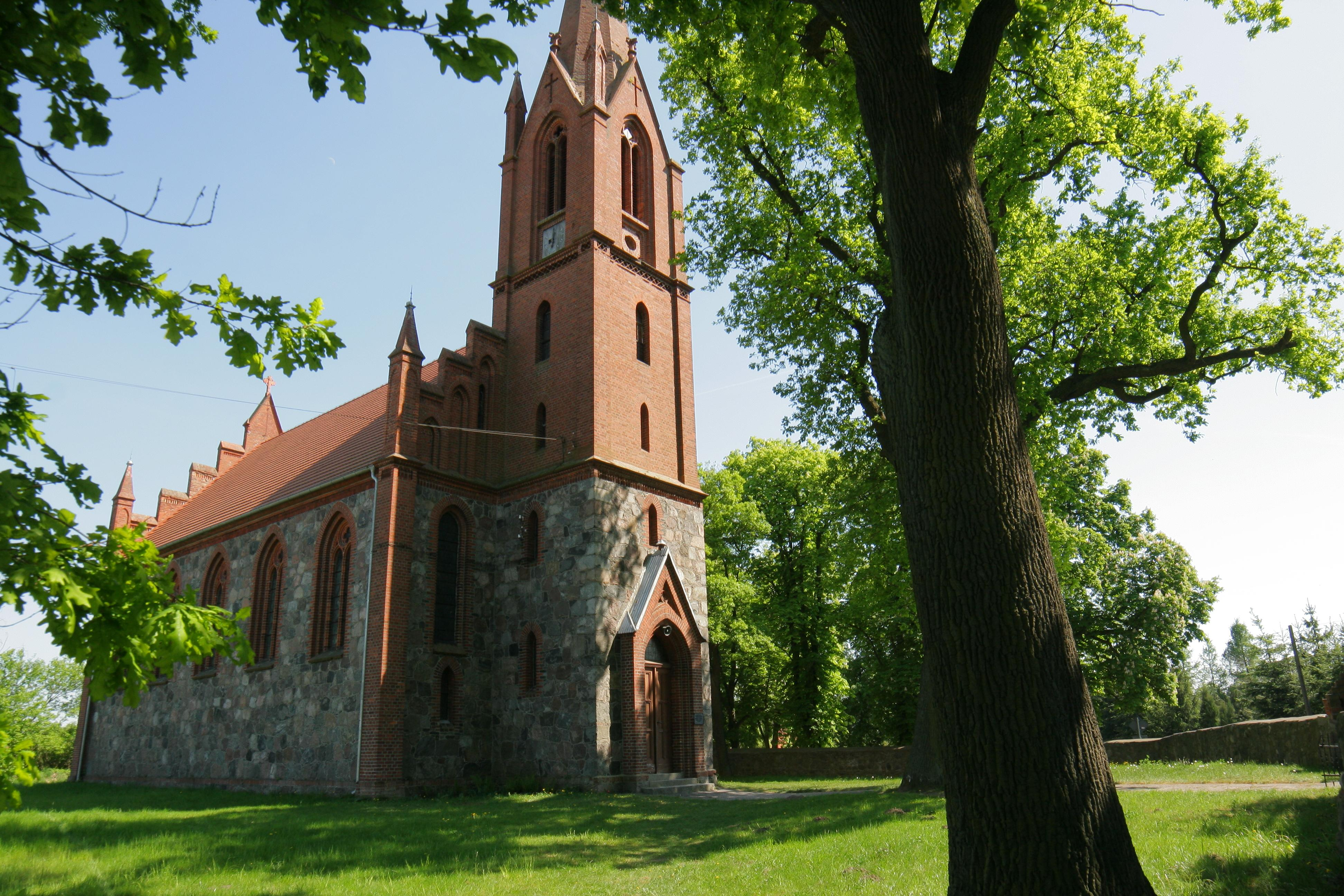
- Village church

- Location within Poland
- Coordinates: 52°54′N 14°57′E
- Country: Poland
- Voivodeship: West Pomeranian
- County: Myślibórz
- Gmina: Myślibórz
- Population: 513

Ławy [ˈwavɨ] (German: Brügge) is a village in the administrative district of Gmina Myślibórz, within Myślibórz County, West Pomeranian Voivodeship, in north-western Poland. It lies approximately 7 km (4 mi) south-east of Myślibórz and 63 km (39 mi) south-east of the regional capital Szczecin.

The village has a population of 513.
