= Gmina Myślibórz =

Gmina Myślibórz Myślibórz Commune
- Gmina
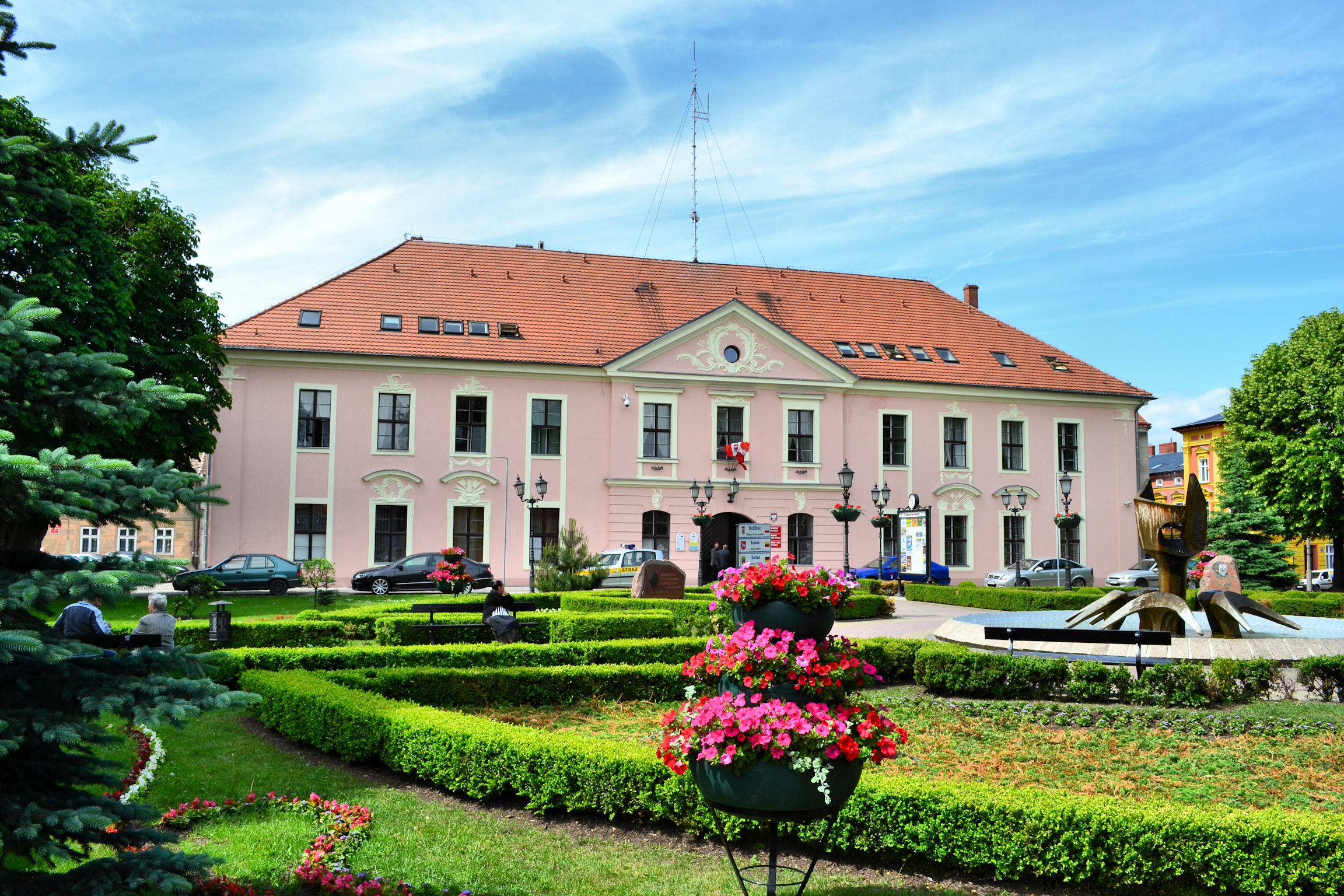
- Town Hall in Myślibórz, seat of the gmina office

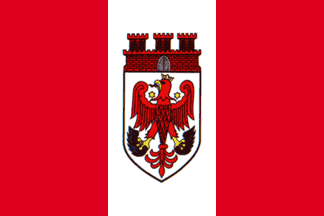
- Flag Coat of arms
- Interactive map of Gmina Myślibórz
- Coordinates (Myślibórz): 52°56′N 14°52′E
- Country: Poland
- Voivodeship: West Pomeranian
- County: Myślibórz
- Seat: Myślibórz

Area
  - Total: 328.33 km^{2} (126.77 sq mi)

Population (2006)
  - Total: 20,898
  - Density: 63.649/km^{2} (164.85/sq mi)
  - Urban: 11,867
  - Rural: 9,031
- Time zone: UTC+1 (CET)
  - Summer (DST): UTC+2 (CEST)
- Vehicle registration: ZMY
- Website: http://www.mysliborz.pl/

Gmina Myślibórz is an urban-rural gmina (administrative district) in Myślibórz County, West Pomeranian Voivodeship, in north-western Poland. Its seat is the town of Myślibórz, which lies approximately 57 kilometres (35 mi) south of the regional capital Szczecin.

The gmina covers an area of 328.33 square kilometres (126.8 sq mi), and as of 2006 its total population is 20,898 (out of which the population of Myślibórz amounts to 11,867, and the population of the rural part of the gmina is 9,031).

== Villages ==
Apart from the town of Myślibórz, Gmina Myślibórz contains the villages and settlements of Bierzwnik, Bucznik, Chełmsko, Chłopówko, Chłopowo, Czeczewo, Czerników, Czółnów, Czyżykowo, Dąbrowa (village), Dąbrowa (settlement in the sołectwo of Rościn), Dalsze, Derczewo, Dzieżgów, Głazów, Golczew, Golenice, Golenicki Młyn, Gryżyno, Grządziele, Iłowo, Janno, Jarużyn, Jezierzyce, Jeziorzyce, Kierzków, Klicko, Kolonia Myśliborzyce, Kostno, Krężel, Krusze, Kruszwin, Ławy, Lichoca, Lipie, Listomie, Mączlino, Mirawno, Myśliborzyce, Nawojczyn, Nawrocko, Niesłusz, Odolanów, Osmolino, Otanów, Pacynowo, Płośno, Pluty, Pniów, Podławie, Podłążek, Prądnik, Przymiarki, Pszczelnik, Renice, Rokicienko, Rościn, Rościnko, Rów, Sądkowo, Sicienko, Sitno, Sobienice, Straszyn, Strzelnik, Sulimierz, Szypuły, Tarnowo, Tchórzynek, Turzyniec, Utonie, Wierzbnica, Wierzbówek, Wrzelewo, Wydmuchy, Zarzecze, Zgnilec and Zgoda.

== Neighbouring gminas ==
Gmina Myślibórz is bordered by the gminas of Banie, Barlinek, Dębno, Kozielice, Lipiany, Lubiszyn, Nowogródek Pomorski, Pyrzyce and Trzcińsko-Zdrój.
