= Lipin =

Lipin may refer to:

- Lipin, Lower Silesian Voivodeship (south-west Poland)
- Lipin, West Pomeranian Voivodeship (north-west Poland)
- Lipin, former German name of Lipiny, Chodzież County, Greater Poland Voivodeship, Poland
- Lipin, a type of Phosphatidate phosphatase
- Lipin (surname)
