= Lawin =

Lawin may refer to:

- Ławin, settlement in the administrative district of Gmina Nowogródek Pomorski
- Lawin, Perak, settlement in Hulu Perak District, Perak, Malaysia
