= Karsko, Myślibórz County =

Karsko
- Village
- Location within Poland
- Coordinates: 52°54′32″N 15°6′44″E
- Country: Poland
- Voivodeship: West Pomeranian
- County: Myślibórz
- Gmina: Nowogródek Pomorski
- Population: 1,200

Karsko [ˈkarskɔ] (German: Karzig) is a village in the administrative district of Gmina Nowogródek Pomorski, within Myślibórz County, West Pomeranian Voivodeship, in north-western Poland. It lies approximately 6 km (4 mi) east of Nowogródek Pomorski, 17 km (11 mi) east of Myślibórz, and 67 km (42 mi) south-east of the regional capital Szczecin.

For the history of the region, see History of Pomerania.

The village has a population of 1,200.
