= Somin =

- Village
- Location within Poland
- Coordinates: 52°52′27″N 15°0′35″E
- Country: Poland
- Voivodeship: West Pomeranian
- County: Myślibórz
- Gmina: Nowogródek Pomorski
- Population: 20

Somin [ˈsɔmin] (German: Sommin) is a village in the administrative district of Gmina Nowogródek Pomorski, within Myślibórz County, West Pomeranian Voivodeship, in north-western Poland. It lies approximately 5 km (3 mi) south of Nowogródek Pomorski, 12 km (7 mi) south-east of Myślibórz, and 67 km (42 mi) south-east of the regional capital Szczecin.

For the history of the region, see History of Pomerania.

The village has a population of 20.
