= Battle of Hagelberg =

1813 battle during the War of the Sixth Coalition

- Part of the German campaign of the Sixth Coalition
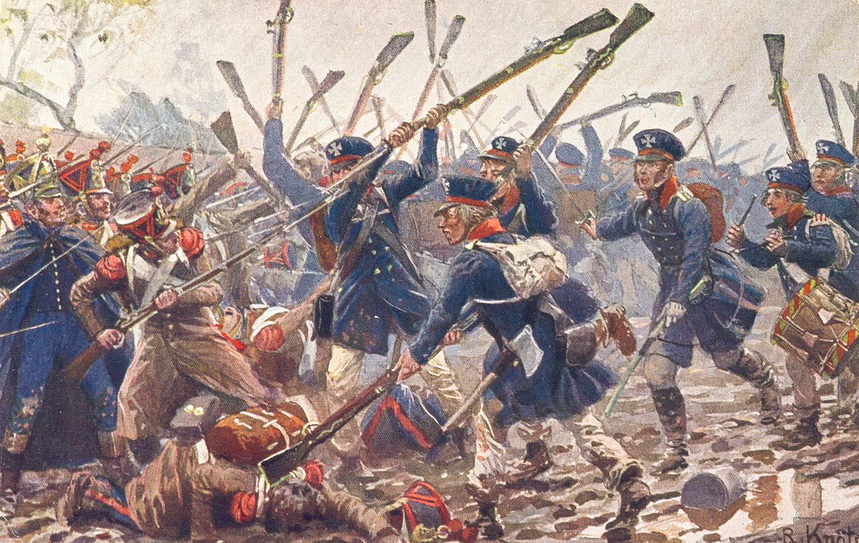
- Prussian Landwehr at Hagelberg by Richard Knötel
Date	27 August 1813
Location	Hagelberg 52°08′N 12°32′E
Result	Coalition victory

Belligerents
Prussia; Russia	France; Saxony; Westphalia

Commanders and leaders
Karl Friedrich von Hirschfeld; Alexander Chernyshyov	Jean-Baptiste Girard (WIA) (POW)

Strength
11,310; 11 guns	8,900; 23 guns

Casualties and losses
1,759	6,000; 8 guns

The 'Battle of Hagelberg (also: Battle of Lübnitz) took place on 27 August 1813, following the Battle of Grossbeeren and in the run-up to the Battle of Leipzig during the War of the Sixth Coalition. A Prussian force of mostly Landwehr militia, together with Russian Cossacks, destroyed a French, Saxon and Westphalian force of 8,900 men.

== Prelude ==
In August 1813, the Napoleonic troops under Marshal Oudinot wanted to take Berlin and thus obtain a favorable starting point for negotiations with the Allies. This plan failed on 23 August 1813 in the Battle of Großbeeren. In order to support Oudinot's troops near Berlin, a larger unit of foot soldiers, cavalry and artillery - around 8,900 men, mainly French, Saxon and Westphalian soldiers - came from the fortress of Magdeburg under division general Jean-Baptiste Girard. Since they did not arrive in time, they struck their camp west of Belzig. When securing the camp, they paid particular attention to the east, because they feared attacks by Cossacks of the Russian army in front of Belzig. The camp was poorly secured to the west.

== Battle ==
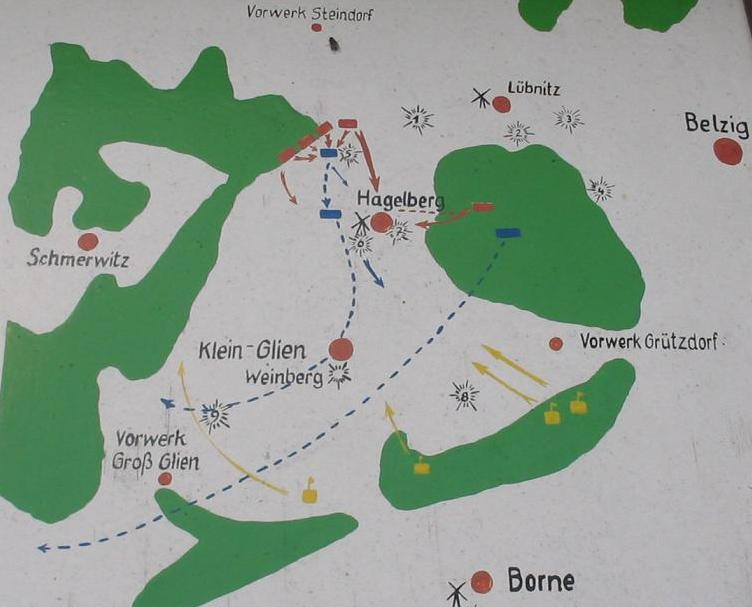
Map of the battle

For a surprise attack on this camp from the east, the Prussian general Karl Friedrich von Hirschfeld gathered troops near Görzke, including four line battalions, fourteen Landwehr battalions and twelve squadrons of Landwehr cavalry that had previously been in western Brandenburg. On the evening of 26 August he had concentrated 10,350 infantry, 960 cavalrymen and 11 guns. The next morning a forester from Steindorf near Lübnitz led the way for, Hirschfeld's contingent through the forest towards Hagelberg. Around 2 p.m. they reached the edge of the forest to the west of the camp, stood up in a makeshift position and attacked somewhat hastily. For the inexperienced Landwehr, the battle threatened to come to a bad end several times. Energetic officers like Lieutenant Colonel Friedrich August von der Marwitz succeeded time and again in putting the units in order.

Since it had been raining since noon, the powder and rifles had often become damp, so that the soldiers mostly fought with bayonets and rifle butts. After 5 p.m., heavy rain barely allowed gunfire and a bloody scuffle broke out on a garden wall in the north of Hagelberg.

Russian Cossacks under General Alexander Chernyshyov, who were quartered in nearby Belzig, were able to decide the battle in favor of Prussia by intervening. The Saxon contingents on the French side then went over to the Prussian side. After 6 p.m. the troops of General Girard, who had meanwhile been seriously wounded, began to retreat towards Magdeburg. An energetic pursuit did not take place due to the general exhaustion on the part of the Prussians. This role was taken over by the Cossacks who attacked the French in Wiesenburg that night. They were able to capture a gun and take numerous prisoners. The Prussian losses were 1,759 dead and wounded, while only around 3,000 French were able to reach Magdeburg unharmed. The French corps had practically ceased to exist, with 1,700 men returning to Magdeburg.

The battle, actually just a skirmish, was one of the first missions of the newly created Landwehr and confirmed the value of this force. After the battle, a total of 136 Iron Crosses were awarded: 80 to officers, 30 to NCOs and 26 to enlisted men.

== Bibliography ==
- Leggiere, Michael V. (2002). Napoleon and Berlin: The Franco-Prussian War in North Germany, 1813. University of Oklahoma Press.
- Joachim Schobeß: Vom Söldnerheer 1806 zum Volksheer 1813. Die märkische Landwehr bei Hagelberg am 27. August 1813, Verleger: Rat des Kreises Belzig – Abt. Kultur, Belzig 1963
- Theodor Rehtwisch: Großbeeren. 23. August 1813, Preussisches Bücherkabinett, Berlin 2005, ISBN 3-938447-03-6
- Frank Bauer: Hagelberg 27. August 1813, (Kleine Reihe Geschichte der Befreiungskriege 1813–1815, H. 22), Potsdam 2008.
- Programm der Hagelbergfeier 1849 belzig.eu (PDF; 4,12 MB)
- Kunze, Reiner: Das Gefecht bei Hagelberg, (Belziger Heimatkalender 1988, S. 6ff)
- Carl von Plotho, Der Krieg in Deutschland und Frankreich in den Jahren 1813 und 1814, Band 3, S.150ff Gefecht bei Lübnitz
