= Stawno, Myślibórz County =

Stawno
- Settlement
- Location within Poland
- Coordinates: 52°52′N 15°10′E
- Country: Poland
- Voivodeship: West Pomeranian
- County: Myślibórz
- Gmina: Nowogródek Pomorski

Stawno [ˈstavnɔ] is a settlement in the administrative district of Gmina Nowogródek Pomorski, within Myślibórz County, West Pomeranian Voivodeship, in north-western Poland. It lies approximately 11 km (7 mi) south-east of Nowogródek Pomorski, 22 km (14 mi) east of Myślibórz, and 73 km (45 mi) south-east of the regional capital Szczecin.

For the history of the region, see History of Pomerania.
