= Heros von Borcke =

Prussian cavalry officer and writer

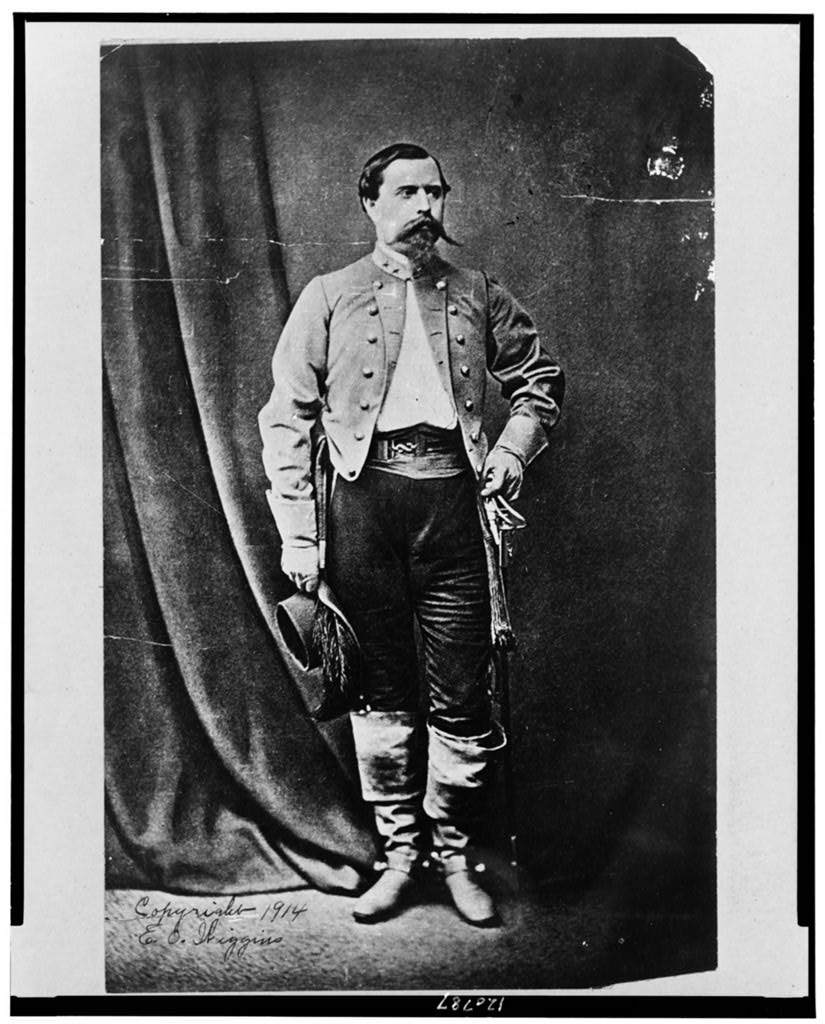
- Von Borcke in uniform, ca. 1864
- Born: Johann Heinrich August Heros von Borcke; July 23, 1835; Ehrenbreitstein Fortress, Rhine Province, Kingdom of Prussia, German Confederation
- Died: May 10, 1895 (aged 59); Berlin, Province of Brandenburg, Kingdom of Prussia, German Empire
- Burial place: Mausoleum von Borcke in the Old Cemetery at Giesenbrügge, Province of Brandenburg; 52°56′28.1″N 15°00′05.2″E
- Spouses: Madalene Honig (m. 1867; died 1883) Tony Honig (m. 1885)
- Children: Wulf Henning Erich; Klaus Werner; Henning Wulf Rüdiger; Karoline Virginia
- Relatives: Sidonia von Borcke
- Military career
- Allegiance: Prussia; Confederate States
- Branch: Prussian Army; Confederate States Army
- Service years: 1853–1862 (Prussia); 1862–1865 (C.S.); 1866–1867 (Prussia)
- Rank: Sekondeleutnant (Prussia); Lieutenant-Colonel (C.S.); Rittmeister (Prussia)
- Units: 2d Brandenburg Dragoons; Cavalry Corps, Army of Northern Virginia; 3d Prussian Dragoons
- Conflicts: Second Italian War of Independence American Civil War: Battle of Seven Pines; Battle of Mechanicsville; Battle of Gaines' Mill; Second Battle of Manassas; Maryland Campaign; Battle of Harpers Ferry; Battle of Crampton's Gap; Battle of Sharpsburg; Battle of Kelly's Ford; Pennsylvania Expedition; Battle of Brandy Station; Battle of Middleburg (WIA); Battle of Yellow Tavern; Austro-Prussian War: Battle of Königgrätz
- Awards: Order of the Red Eagle, 4th Class with Swords; Commemorative Cross for 1866; Order of the Crown (Prussia), 3rd Class
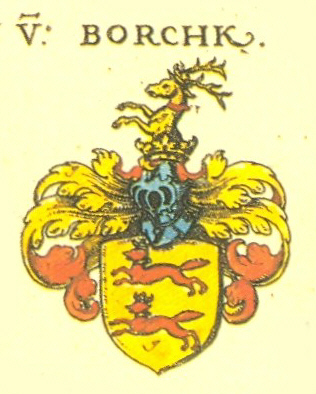
- Coat of Arms of the House of Borcke

Johann Heinrich August Heros von Borcke (July 23, 1835 – May 10, 1895) was a Prussian cavalry officer and writer. Today, he is best known for his enduring memoir, Memoirs of the Confederate War for Independence (1866), which recounts his two years' service (1862–1864) as a Confederate cavalry officer in the Army of Northern Virginia, during the American Civil War.

== Family and education ==
Heros von Borcke came from the old Pomeranian noble family von Borcke. His father Theodor von Borcke (1805-1878) was the owner of a manor on Giesenbrügge in the New Mark district of Soldin and since 1856 a member of the Prussian manor house. His mother Therese was born Adloff (1815-1847). He was educated at the Franckesche Stiftungen.

Heros von Borcke married Madalene Honig (1845-1883), the daughter of the Gralow landowner Edmund Honig and his wife Karoline, née von Klitzing, in Gralow in the Landsberg an der Warthe district in 1867. In his second marriage in 1885 he married their younger sister Tony Honig (1849-1928), also at Gut Gralow.

== Military career ==
Von Borcke became a Prussian cavalry officer in 1855, served with the Guards Cuirassiers, left for studies in 1858, was reserve officer with the 2. Garde-Landwehr-Kavallerieregiment (mobilized during the Second Italian War of Independence) and returned to active duty from 1859 to 1862 in the 5th Squadron of the 2d Brandenburg Dragoons (Brandenburgisches Dragoner-Regiment Nr. 2). Financial difficulties forced 2nd Lieutenant von Borcke to quit the service, whereupon he emigrated to the Confederate States in 1862.

=== American Civil War ===
Von Borcke brought with him a massive Solingen straight sword, which would become famous during his ensuing career. By the end of the month, he had made his way to Richmond, capital of the Confederate States. He was given the rank of captain in the Provisional Army of the Confederate States on June 1 of that year and assigned to Major-General J. E. B. Stuart by the order of Secretary of War George W. Randolph. Von Borcke was conspicuous on the battlefield for his large height and girth and the extremely large sword he wielded, became known as the "giant in gray."

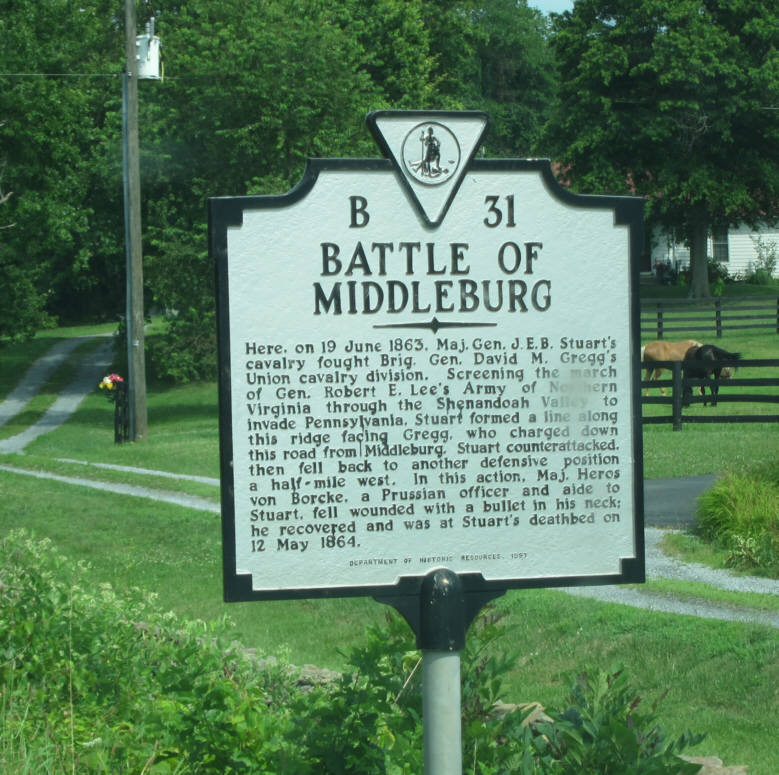
Commemorative plaque image

Stuart soon was impressed by the new arrival, and the two became fast friends. Following the cavalry's famed "ride around McClellan's army", General Stuart wrote, "Capt. Heros von Borcke, a Prussian cavalry officer, who lately ran the blockade, assigned me by the honorable Secretary of War, joined in the charge of the First Squadron in gallant style, and subsequently, by his energy, skill, and activity, won the praise and admiration of all".

In August of the year, Von Borcke was promoted to the rank of major, an appointment confirmed by the Confederate States Congress on September 19. He rode with General Stuart as his adjutant general during the Northern Virginia and the Maryland campaigns, further adding to his reputation for bravery in the face of the enemy. Stuart detailed him to accompany the body of fallen horse artillerist John Pelham to Richmond for burial following Pelham's death at Kelly's Ford.

During the Battle of Middleburg, Von Borcke suffered a significant wound from a bullet in his neck and was incapacitated for the remainder of the year. He recovered enough to resume staff duties in the spring of 1864, and was present at Yellow Tavern in which General Stuart was killed. In December of that year, he was promoted again, this time to lieutenant-colonel and voted the official thanks of Congress. Von Borcke was then sent by President Jefferson Davis on a diplomatic mission to Great Britain.

=== Austro-Prussian War ===
With the collapse of the Confederate States in the spring of 1865 and the ensuing surrender of the Army of Northern Virginia, Von Borcke returned to Prussia. He resumed his career and fought in the Austro-Prussian War on the staff of Prince Friedrich Karl of Prussia, receiving the Order of the Red Eagle for his gallantry. He married Madalene Honig and raised three sons.

== Later life ==
Suffering from war wounds, von Borcke retired from the Prussian Army in 1867 and bought an estate at Sichts (Polish: Żychce). After his father's death he returned home to Giesenbrügge (Polish: Giżyn), where he is said to have regularly hoisted the Confederate flag on his estate. He published his memoirs, on the Army of Northern Virginia, in 1866.

In 1883, von Borcke's wife died, and two years later, he married her sister Tony. They named their daughter Caroline Virginia Magdalene (b. 31 July 1885 at Rittergut Giesenbrügge) in honor of Borcke's adopted state and his first wife. In between, in 1884, he sailed back to revisit the Southern United States and was reunited with many former comrades and friends, including Wade Hampton, William H. F. Lee, and Matthew C. Butler. He died in Berlin in 1895 due to a sepsis caused by the remaining projectile which had wounded him in the Battle of Middleburg on 19 June 1863. His headstone over his grave in Giesenbrügge was destroyed by the Red Army during World War II. The Sons of Confederate Veterans (SCV) purchased a new headstone, which was reinstalled in 2008.

== In popular culture ==
"Johann Heros von Borcke" was played by Matt Lindquist in Gods and Generals, a 2003 American period war drama film based on Jeffrey Shaara's 1996 novel of the same name.

Von Borcke appears in The Gray Ghost episode "An Eye for an Eye", where he is portrayed by John Banner.
