= Golin, Myślibórz County =

Golin
- Village
- Location within Poland
- Coordinates: 52°53′20″N 15°4′1″E
- Country: Poland
- Voivodeship: West Pomeranian
- County: Myślibórz
- Gmina: Nowogródek Pomorski
- Population: 60

Golin [ˈɡɔlin] (German: Gollin) is a village in the administrative district of Gmina Nowogródek Pomorski, within Myślibórz County, West Pomeranian Voivodeship, in north-western Poland. It lies approximately 4 km (2 mi) south-east of Nowogródek Pomorski, 15 km (9 mi) east of Myślibórz, and 67 km (42 mi) south-east of the regional capital Szczecin.

For the history of the region, see History of Pomerania.

The village has a population of 60.
