= Parzeńsko =

- Village
- Location within Poland
- Coordinates: 52°53′N 15°7′E
- Country: Poland
- Voivodeship: West Pomeranian
- County: Myślibórz
- Gmina: Nowogródek Pomorski

Parzeńsko [paˈʐɛɲskɔ] (German: Wollhaus) is a village in the administrative district of Gmina Nowogródek Pomorski, within Myślibórz County, West Pomeranian Voivodeship, in north-western Poland. It lies approximately 7 km (4 mi) south-east of Nowogródek Pomorski, 18 km (11 mi) east of Myślibórz, and 70 km (43 mi) south-east of the regional capital Szczecin.

For the history of the region, see History of Pomerania.
