= Kinice, West Pomeranian Voivodeship =

Kinice
- Village
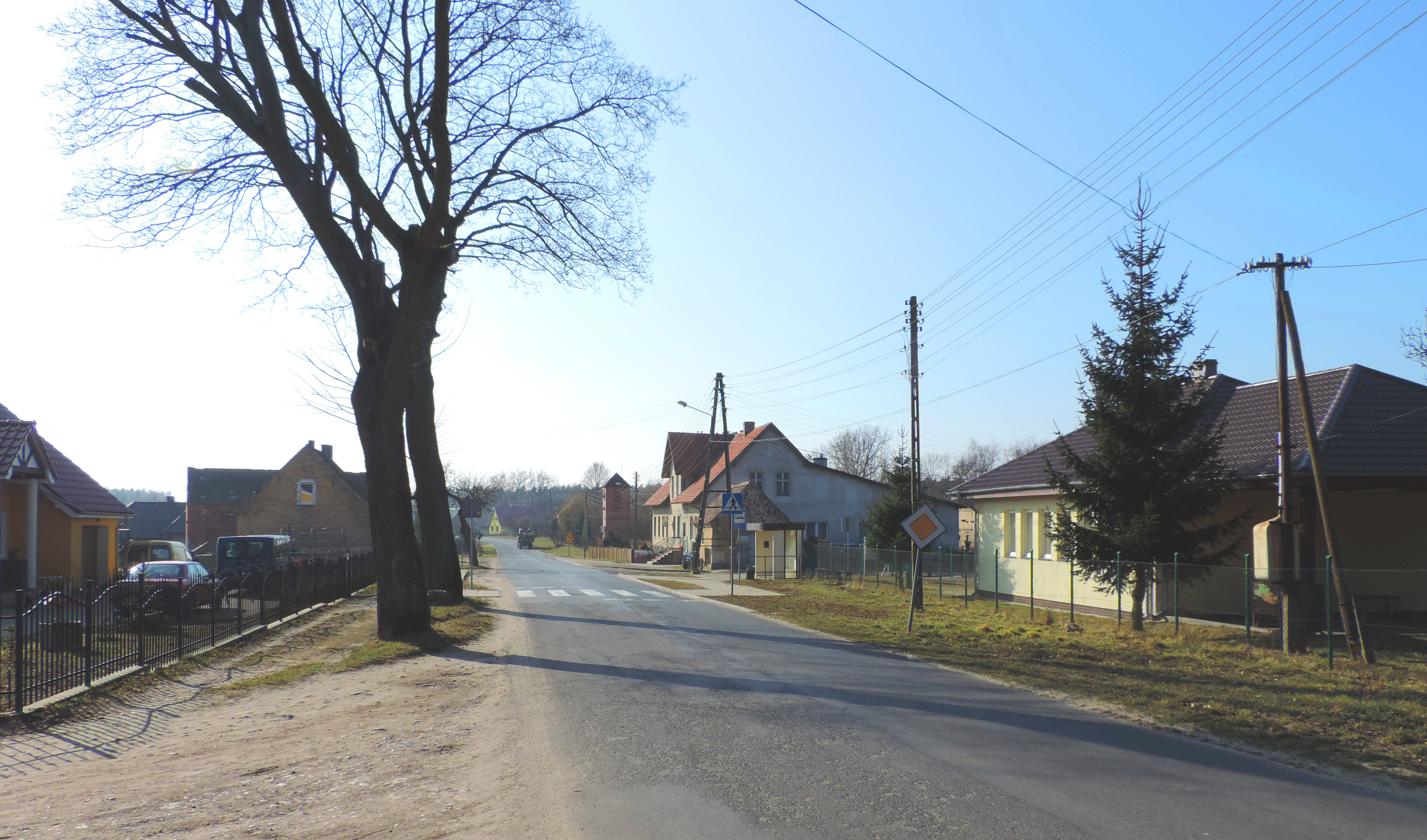

- Location within Poland
- Coordinates: 52°56′N 15°5′E
- Country: Poland
- Voivodeship: West Pomeranian
- County: Myślibórz
- Gmina: Nowogródek Pomorski
- Population (2002): 203
- Time zone: UTC+1 (CET)
  - Summer (DST): UTC+2 (CEST)
- Area code: +48 95
- Vehicle registration: ZMY

Kinice [kiˈnit͡sɛ] (German: Kienitz) is a village in the administrative district of Gmina Nowogródek Pomorski, within Myślibórz County, West Pomeranian Voivodeship, in north-western Poland. It lies approximately 5 km (3 mi) north-east of Nowogródek Pomorski, 15 km (9 mi) east of Myślibórz, and 64 km (40 mi) south-east of the regional capital Szczecin.

In Kinice there is a Catholic church of Our Lady of Help to the Faithful, subordinate to the parish in nearby Nowogródek Pomorski.

Polish speedway rider, 2019 World Champion Bartosz Zmarzlik comes from Kinice.
