= Rataje, West Pomeranian Voivodeship =

Rataje
- Village
- Location within Poland
- Coordinates: 52°52′25″N 15°2′34″E
- Country: Poland
- Voivodeship: West Pomeranian
- County: Myślibórz
- Gmina: Nowogródek Pomorski
- Population: 70

Rataje [raˈtajɛ] (German: Kossäthenfeld) is a village in the administrative district of Gmina Nowogródek Pomorski, within Myślibórz County, West Pomeranian Voivodeship, in northwestern Poland. It lies approximately 5 km (3 mi) south of Nowogródek Pomorski, 14 km (9 mi) south-east of Myślibórz, and 68 km (42 mi) southeast of the regional capital Szczecin. It has a population of 70.

For the region's history, see History of Pomerania.
