= Karlin, West Pomeranian Voivodeship =

Karlin
- Village
- Location within Poland
- Coordinates: 52°55′12″N 15°3′38″E
- Country: Poland
- Voivodeship: West Pomeranian
- County: Myślibórz
- Gmina: Nowogródek Pomorski
- Population: 60

Karlin [ˈkarlin] (German: Keller) is a village in the administrative district of Gmina Nowogródek Pomorski, within Myślibórz County, West Pomeranian Voivodeship, in north-western Poland. It lies approximately 3 km (2 mi) north-east of Nowogródek Pomorski, 14 km (9 mi) east of Myślibórz, and 64 km (40 mi) south-east of the regional capital Szczecin.

For the history of the region, see History of Pomerania.

The village has a population of 60.
