= Smólsko, Myślibórz County =

Smólsko
- Village
- Location within Poland
- Coordinates: 52°52′5″N 15°1′13″E
- Country: Poland
- Voivodeship: West Pomeranian
- County: Myślibórz
- Gmina: Nowogródek Pomorski
- Population: 10

Smólsko [ˈsmulskɔ] is a village in the administrative district of Gmina Nowogródek Pomorski, within Myślibórz County, West Pomeranian Voivodeship, in north-western Poland. It lies approximately 5 km (3 mi) south of Nowogródek Pomorski, 13 km (8 mi) south-east of Myślibórz, and 68 km (42 mi) south-east of the regional capital Szczecin.

For the history of the region, see History of Pomerania.

The village has a population of 10.
