= Giżyn, Myślibórz County =

Giżyn
- Village
- Location within Poland
- Coordinates: 52°56′36″N 15°0′29″E
- Country: Poland
- Voivodeship: West Pomeranian
- County: Myślibórz
- Gmina: Nowogródek Pomorski
- Population: 400

Giżyn [ˈɡiʐɨn] (German: Giesenbrügge) is a village in the administrative district of Gmina Nowogródek Pomorski, within Myślibórz County, West Pomeranian Voivodeship, in north-western Poland. It lies approximately 4 km (2 mi) north of Nowogródek Pomorski, 10 km (6 mi) east of Myślibórz, and 60 km (37 mi) south-east of the regional capital Szczecin.

For the history of the region, see History of Pomerania.

The village has a population of 400.

== Notable residents ==
- Heros von Borcke (1835–1895), Prussian cavalry officer, who is best known as a Confederate cavalry officer who fought in the American Civil War.
