= Smolary, West Pomeranian Voivodeship =

Smolary
- Village
- Location within Poland
- Coordinates: 52°51′32″N 15°1′42″E
- Country: Poland
- Voivodeship: West Pomeranian
- County: Myślibórz
- Gmina: Nowogródek Pomorski
- Population: 20

Smolary [smɔˈlarɨ] is a village in the administrative district of Gmina Nowogródek Pomorski, within Myślibórz County, West Pomeranian Voivodeship, in north-western Poland. It lies approximately 6 km (4 mi) south of Nowogródek Pomorski, 14 km (9 mi) south-east of Myślibórz, and 69 km (43 mi) south-east of the regional capital Szczecin.

For the history of the region, see History of Pomerania.

The village has a population of 20.
