= Trzcinna =

- Village
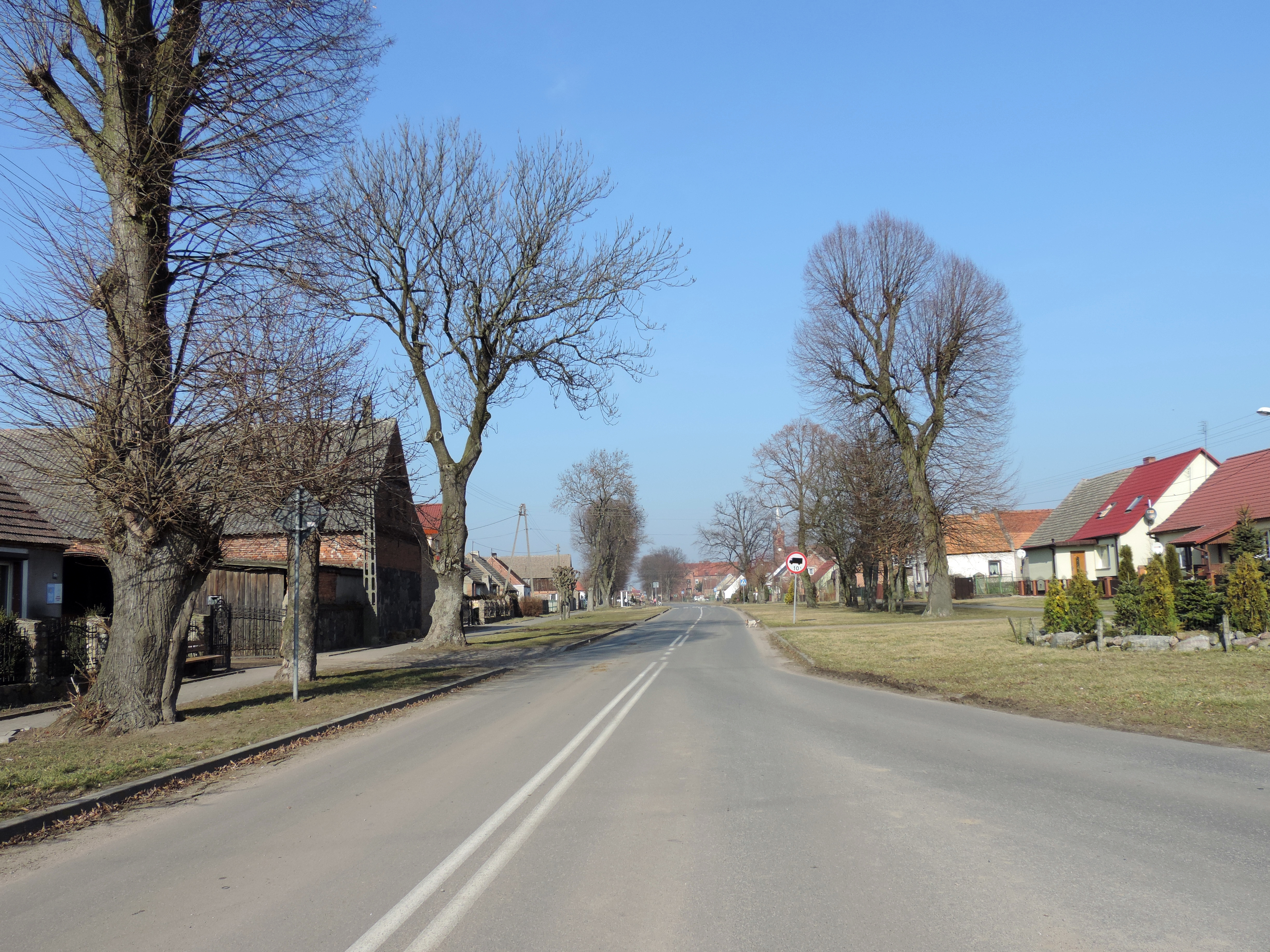

- Location within Poland
- Coordinates: 52°53′N 15°1′E
- Country: Poland
- Voivodeship: West Pomeranian
- County: Myślibórz
- Gmina: Nowogródek Pomorski

Population
  - Total: 370
- Time zone: UTC+1 (CET)
  - Summer (DST): UTC+2 (CEST)
- Vehicle registration: ZMY

Trzcinna [ˈtʂt͡ɕinna] (German: Schöneberg) is a village in the administrative district of Gmina Nowogródek Pomorski, within Myślibórz County, West Pomeranian Voivodeship, in north-western Poland. It lies approximately 4 km (2 mi) south of Nowogródek Pomorski, 12 km (7 mi) south-east of Myślibórz, and 66 km (41 mi) south-east of the regional capital Szczecin.

The village has a population of 370.

== History ==
The territory became part of the emerging Polish state under its first ruler Mieszko I around 967.
