= Chocień =

- Village
- Location within Poland
- Coordinates: 52°52′7″N 14°58′37″E
- Country: Poland
- Voivodeship: West Pomeranian
- County: Myślibórz
- Gmina: Nowogródek Pomorski
- Population: 30

Chocień [ˈxɔt͡ɕɛɲ] (German: Landwehr) is a village in the administrative district of Gmina Nowogródek Pomorski, within Myślibórz County, West Pomeranian Voivodeship, in north-western Poland. It lies approximately 6 km (4 mi) south-west of Nowogródek Pomorski, 11 km (7 mi) south-east of Myślibórz, and 67 km (42 mi) south-east of the regional capital Szczecin.

For the history of the region, see History of Pomerania.

The village has a population of 30.
