= Borcke =

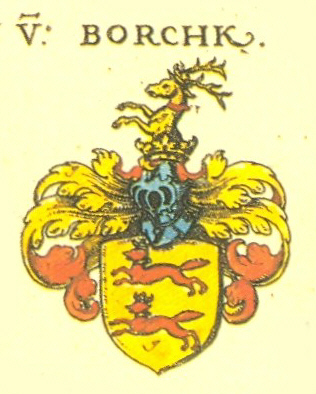
Coat of Arms of the Borcke family

The Borcke family also spelled von Bork, Borke or Borken, was an old Pomeranian noble family.

== History ==
Accordíng to Seweryn Uruski (1817–1890) the family was originally known as Borek or z Borku. The family itself traces the name back to Pribislaus, son of Borko ("Pribislaus, Filius Borkonis"), who was mentioned in a medieval document in 1186/87. In 1297 Nikolaus Borko was the first to use this as a family name.

== Notable members ==
- Sidonia von Borcke (1548–1620), noble woman executed for witchcraft
- Georg Matthias von Borcke (1671–1740)
- Adrian Bernhard von Borcke (1668–1741)
- Kaspar Wilhelm von Borcke (1704–1747)
- Heinrich Adrian von Borcke (1715–1788)
- Karl August Ferdinand von Borcke (1776–1830), general
- Johann Heinrich August Heros von Borcke (1835–1895), Prussian cavalry officer
- Fabian von Borcke (born 1966), politician
