= Sumiak =

- Village
- Location within Poland
- Coordinates: 52°54′N 15°2′E
- Country: Poland
- Voivodeship: West Pomeranian
- County: Myślibórz
- Gmina: Nowogródek Pomorski

Sumiak [ˈsumjak] (German: Kleefeld) is a village in the administrative district of Gmina Nowogródek Pomorski, within Myślibórz County, West Pomeranian Voivodeship, in north-western Poland. It lies approximately 2 km (1 mi) south of Nowogródek Pomorski, 12 km (7 mi) east of Myślibórz, and 65 km (40 mi) south-east of the regional capital Szczecin.

For the history of the region, see History of Pomerania.
