= Gmina Nowogródek Pomorski =

Gmina Nowogródek Pomorski Nowogródek Pomorski Commune
- Gmina
- Coat of arms
- Interactive map of Gmina Nowogródek Pomorski
- Coordinates (Nowogródek Pomorski): 52°54′40″N 15°1′44″E
- Country: Poland
- Voivodeship: West Pomeranian
- County: Myślibórz
- Seat: Nowogródek Pomorski

Area
  - Total: 146.15 km^{2} (56.43 sq mi)

Population (2006)
  - Total: 3,282
  - Density: 22.46/km^{2} (58.16/sq mi)
- Website: http://www.nowogrodekpomorski.pl/

Gmina Nowogródek Pomorski is a rural gmina (administrative district) in Myślibórz County, West Pomeranian Voivodeship, in north-western Poland. Its seat is the village of Nowogródek Pomorski, which lies approximately 12 kilometres (7 mi) east of Myślibórz and 64 km (40 mi) south-east of the regional capital Szczecin.

The gmina covers an area of 146.15 square kilometres (56.4 sq mi), and as of 2006 its total population is 3,282.

The gmina contains part of the protected area called Barlinek-Gorzów Landscape Park.

== Villages ==
Gmina Nowogródek Pomorski contains the villages and settlements of Chocień, Giżyn, Golin, Karlin, Karsko, Kinice, Kolonia Nowogródek Pomorski, Ławin, Lipin, Pachocino, Parzeńsko, Rataje, Rokitno, Smolary, Smólsko, Sołacz, Somin, Stawno, Sumiak, Świątki, Trzciniec, Trzcinna and Ulejno.

== Neighbouring gminas ==
Gmina Nowogródek Pomorski is bordered by the gminas of Barlinek, Kłodawa, Lubiszyn and Myślibórz.
