= Kolonia Nowogródek Pomorski =

- Village
- Location within Poland
- Coordinates: 52°54′04″N 15°01′57″E
- Country: Poland
- Voivodeship: West Pomeranian
- County: Myślibórz
- Gmina: Nowogródek Pomorski

Kolonia Nowogródek Pomorski [kɔˈlɔɲa nɔvɔˈɡrudɛk pɔˈmɔrski] is a village in the administrative district of Gmina Nowogródek Pomorski, within Myślibórz County, West Pomeranian Voivodeship, in north-western Poland.

For the history of the region, see History of Pomerania.
