= Ulejno, West Pomeranian Voivodeship =

Ulejno
- Settlement
- Location within Poland
- Coordinates: 52°57′33″N 15°04′41″E
- Country: Poland
- Voivodeship: West Pomeranian
- County: Myślibórz
- Gmina: Nowogródek Pomorski

Ulejno [uˈlɛi̯nɔ] (German: Krügerswunsch) is a settlement in the administrative district of Gmina Nowogródek Pomorski, within Myślibórz County, West Pomeranian Voivodeship, in north-western Poland.

For the history of the region, see History of Pomerania.
