= Alexander Chernyshyov =

Russian soldier and statesman (1786–1857)

Knyaz Alexander Chernyshyov
- Александр Чернышёв
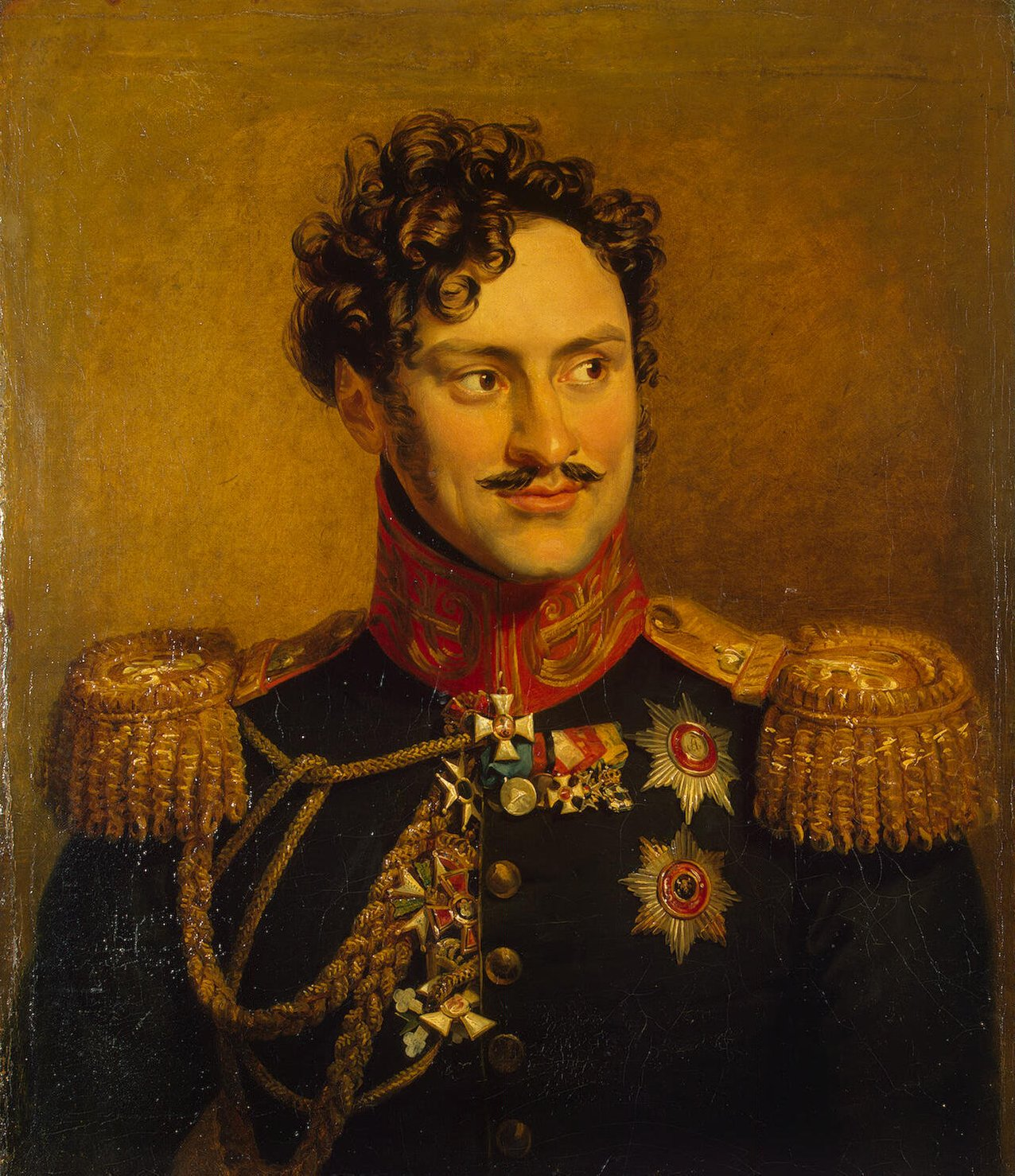
- Portrait by George Dawe (Military Gallery of the Winter Palace)
- Born: January 10–11, 1786–1787 (Note: O.S. 30–31 December 1785–1786); Moscow
- Died: June 20, 1857; Castellammare di Stabia
- Other name: Aleksandr Chernyshev
- Military career
- Allegiance: Russia
- Branch: Imperial Russian Army
- Rank: General of the cavalry
- Commands: 1st St. Petersburg Uhlan Regiment (since 1833) [ru] 80th Kabardia Infantry Regiment (since 1843) [ru]
- Conflicts: German campaign of 1813; • Attack on Berlin by Chernyshyov and Tettenborn's detachments [ru]; • Battle of Hagelberg; Campaign in north-east France (1814); • Storming of Soissons [ru]
- Awards: Orders of: • St. George 4th (1808), 3rd (1813) degrees; • St. Alexander Nevsky (1820); • St. Vladimir 1st Degree (1828); • St. Andrew (1831)

Minister of War of Russia
- In office 1827–1852
- Monarch: Nicholas I
- Preceded by: Aleksandr Tatischev
- Succeeded by: Vasily Dolgorukov
Other offices held
Member of the Cabinet of Ministers
In office 1827–1856
Monarchs	Nicholas I Alexander II
Chairman of the Cabinet of Ministers
In office 1848–1856
Monarchs	Nicholas I Alexander II
Member of the State Council
In office 1828–posthumously
Monarchs	Nicholas I Alexander II
Chairman of the State Council
In office 1848–1856
Monarchs	Nicholas I Alexander II
Preceded by	Vasily Levashov [ru]
Succeeded by	Alexey Orlov
Member of the Siberian Committee [ru]
In office 1830–1838
Monarch	Nicholas I
Chairman of the Siberian Committee
In office 1852–1856
Monarchs	Nicholas I Alexander II
Chairman of the Caucasian Committee [ru]
In office 1845–1856
Monarchs	Nicholas I Alexander II
Honorary President of the Imperial Military Academy
In office 1852–posthumously
Monarchs	Nicholas I Alexander II

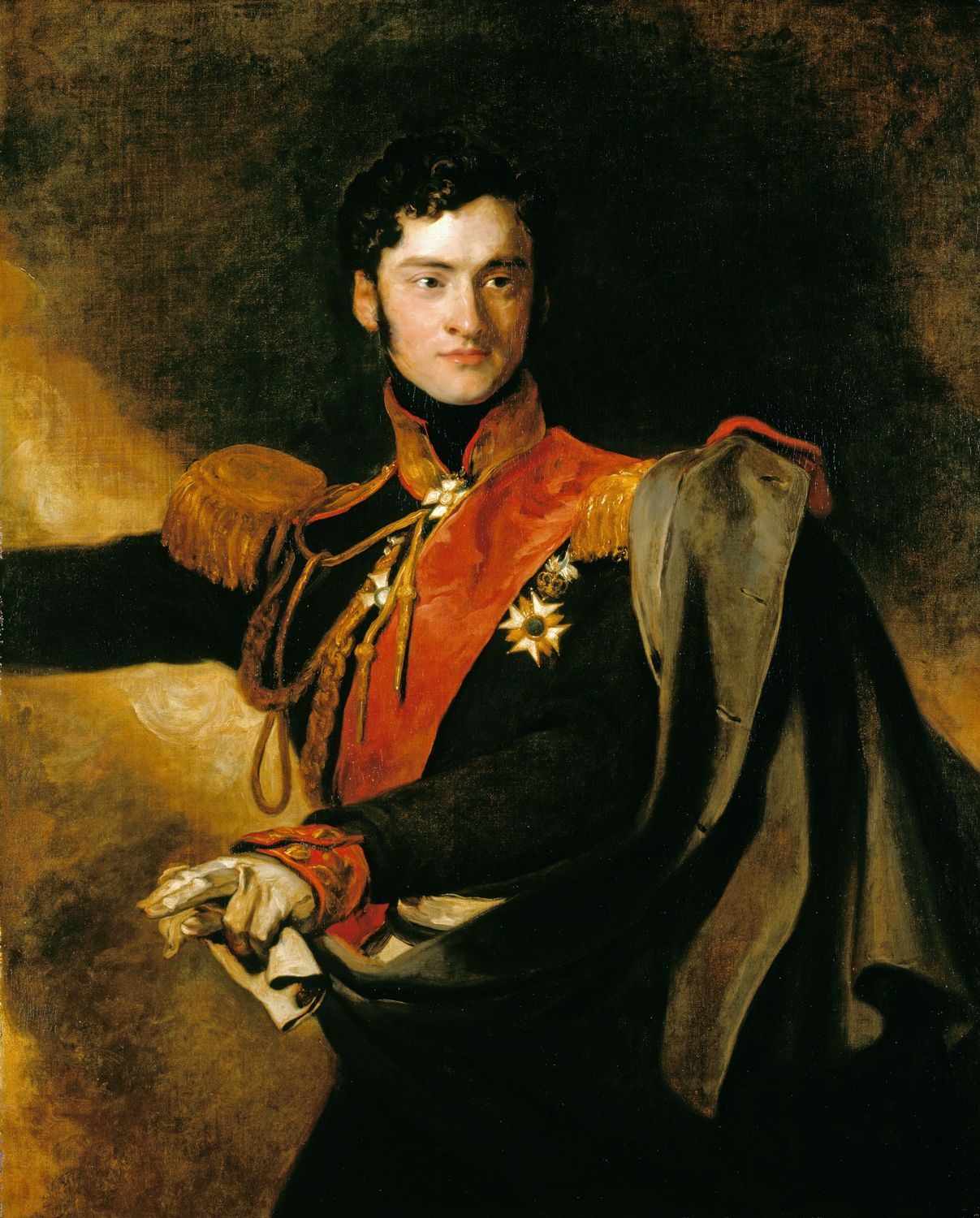
Portrait by Thomas Lawrence (Windsor Castle collection)

Prince Alexander Ivanovich Chernyshyov (Note: Also spelled Aleksandr Chernyshev as per the romanization of Russian.) (Russian: Александр Иванович Чернышёв; 1786, Moscow – 1857, Castellammare di Stabia), General of Cavalry (1827), was a Russian military leader, diplomat and statesman, whose career began in the Napoleonic Wars. After the Battle of Austerlitz (1805), he carried out successful diplomatic missions to France and Sweden and served with distinction in battles of 1812 and 1813. Chernyshyov rose through the ranks to the role of Russian Minister of War (1827–1852), member and chairman of the State Council (1827–1856) and Cabinet of Ministers (1828–1856), and acquired the styles from Count (1826) to Serene Prince (1849).

Chernyshyov paid great attention to the logistics of the Russian Army, carried out a number of reforms that consolidated the army's recruitment system (Charter of 1831), strengthened the centralisation of the Ministry of War.

== Biography ==
=== Austerlitz and Friedland ===
Alexander Chernyshyov was a son of Lieutenant General and senator, Ivan Lvovich Chernyshyov. As soon as Alexander was born, his influential father "enlisted" him to the elite Mounted Guards Regiment (Russian: Конногвардейский полк) of Russian Imperial Guard. He joined the real service in Chevalier Guards in 1802, already favorably known to Emperor Alexander I.

A lieutenant of the Guards (гвардии поручик) since September 1804, he served with distinction in Battle of Wischau and Battle of Austerlitz, earning combat Order of St. Vladimir for the latter. During the War of the Fourth Coalition, Chernyshyov again excelled at Battle of Heilsberg and Battle of Friedland, and was awarded Order of St. George, fourth class, and an honorary Golden Sword for Bravery. However, the coalition lost the battle and the war, and Tsar Alexander settled on diplomacy instead of fighting.

=== Diplomatic career ===
In 1808, Emperor Alexander sent Chernyshyov as his private messenger to Napoleon, who at that time started the Peninsular War in Spain. Chernyshyov reached him in Bayonne, taking notes of French military development on his journey. He managed to establish a personalized link between two emperors and earned Napoleon's trust. Next year, tsar Alexander assigned Chernyshyov to be his permanent private envoy to Napoleon (parallel to regular Ambassador of Russia). Chernyshyov, a member of Napoleon's retinue, accompanied French headquarters throughout the War of the Fifth Coalition, and received the Légion d'honneur for the Battle of Wagram. In October 1809, he was promoted to the rank of Rittmeister of the Guards, next year—to Colonel.

As the military attaché of Russia in Paris (1810 – end of 1811), Chernyshyov was in charge of intelligence operations. His best known success was hiring a clerk of French General Staff, who regularly supplied the Russians with complete copies of French troop disposition. As a result, the Russians were well aware of concentration of French troops.

Another successful operation was his mediation of talks between Swedish envoys led by Karl Otto Mörner and Jean-Baptiste Bernadotte, who was elected Crown Prince of Sweden in August 1810 and eventually ascended to the Swedish throne in 1818 as Charles XIV John of Sweden. Mutual understanding between Chernyshyov and Bernadotte became an asset in January 1812, during their negotiations about Sweden's stance in the anticipated French invasion of Russia. However, Russian diplomacy failed in recruiting Bernadotte into military coalition, and the talks culminated in the Treaty of Åbo (30 August 1812), which upheld Sweden's friendly neutrality.

=== Campaign of 1812 ===
In the end of September 1812, Admiral Pavel Chichagov assigned Chernyshyov to lead a mobile detachment into the Duchy of Warsaw (south-eastern Poland), to destroy enemy food dumps and disrupt French supply lines. Chernyshyov's force included 7 squadrons of regular cavalry, three Cossacks regiments and a regiment of Kalmyks, a total of 1800 soldiers. October 11, they intercepted their first target south from Brest-Litovsk. Austrian commander Count Schwarzenberg, launched the hunt for Chernyshyov's corps. Chernyshyov responded with separating his force: while smaller detachments set up a screen diverting Austrians, the main force was plundering French and Austrian supplies and taking prisoners north. In the end, Austrians intercepted some of their property back, but Chernyshyov managed to evade the trap and returned to Russian base in Włodawa October 18.

In November, Chichagov, based in Slonim, discovered imminent danger from an Austrian pursuit corps, and dispatched Chernyshyov to rear guard. November 8, Chernyshyov established contact with advancing Austrians near Volkovyssk. Cossack units destroyed existing bridges over Neman River and the Austrian supply of timber. Next day, Chichagov ordered Chernyshyov to march through the enemy territory and make contact with Russian corps of general Peter Wittgenstein. For five days, his regiment marched at night and made daytime ambushes against French communications; in one of these ambushes, Chernyshyov's cossacks released general Ferdinand Wintzingerode and three Russian officers held prisoners by the French. This raid promoted Chernyshyov to Major General.

On 31 December 1812 Chernyshyov defeated Eugène de Beauharnais at Marienwerder, earning his second Order of St. George.

=== Campaigns of 1813–1815 ===
Chernyshyov, based in Poland, met with resistance from Napoleon's Lithuanian troops; these were defeated in January–February 1813. He advanced on Berlin and was the first to capture the city, earning Order of St. Anna, first class. In 1813, he was engaged in action at Lüneburg, Kassel and Hagelberg. This was followed by a cavalry raid in Westfalen.

In 1814, he was distinguished for assault on Soissons; in 1815—for taking Chalon; in between the two campaigns, he was tsar Alexander's aide at the Congress of Vienna. Chernyshyov became Lieutenant General in March 1814, at the age of 27.

=== Political career ===
His peacetime career in the reign of Alexander slowed down; since 1819 Chernyshyov was assigned to the Don Cossack Troops Commission and headed this institution in 1821–1835. In 1821, he became the commander of Light Division of Imperial Guards, and established close contact with Nicholas, the future tsar of Russia.

Accession of Nicholas to the throne and the aftermath of Decembrist revolt accelerated Chernyshyov's career, who joined the close circle of tsar's most trusted officers. Nicholas appointed Chernyshyov to the commission investigating the revolt, and rewarded this service with titles of Count (1826), General of Cavalry (1827), a seat in State Council, and the appointment as acting Minister of War. "Acting" status was replaced with proper Minister of War appointment in 1832, which he held until 1852. Nicholas relied on Chernyshyov's personal experience in 1812 guerilla warfare in his handling of Caucasian War.

In 1848, Chernyshyov consolidated the roles of Chairman of State Council (senate of Russia) and Cabinet of ministers, being the highest-ranking statesman of Russian until 1856.

Ageing Chernyshyov was sent to honorary retirement upon ascension of Alexander II of Russia, which coincided with the final stage of the disastrous Crimean War. Chernyshyov, the chief of land forces throughout most of Nicholas I period, bears full responsibility for the performance of Russian military in Crimea.

=== Progeny ===
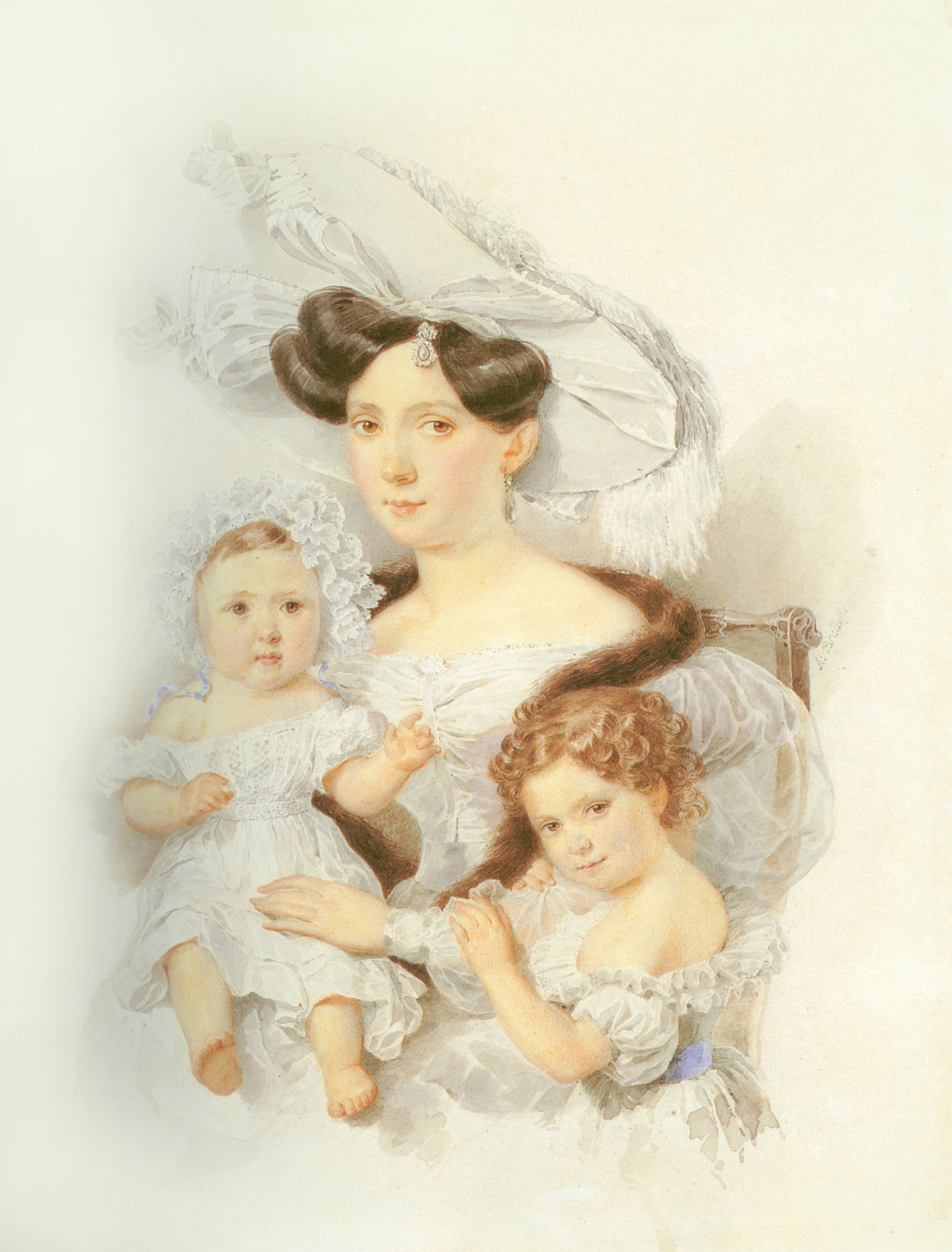
Countess Chernyshyova with her daughters Yelisaveta and Alexandra

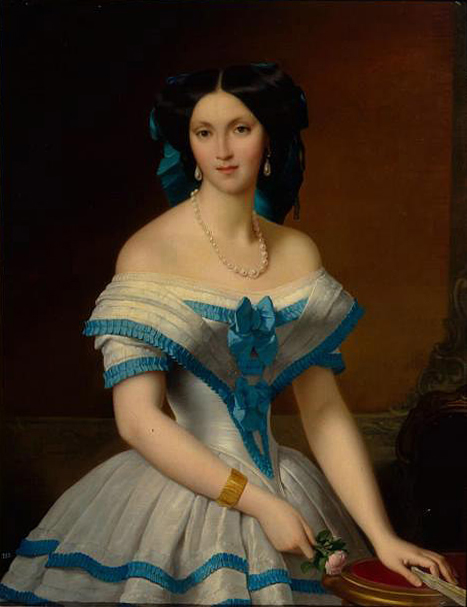
Yelisaveta, daughter

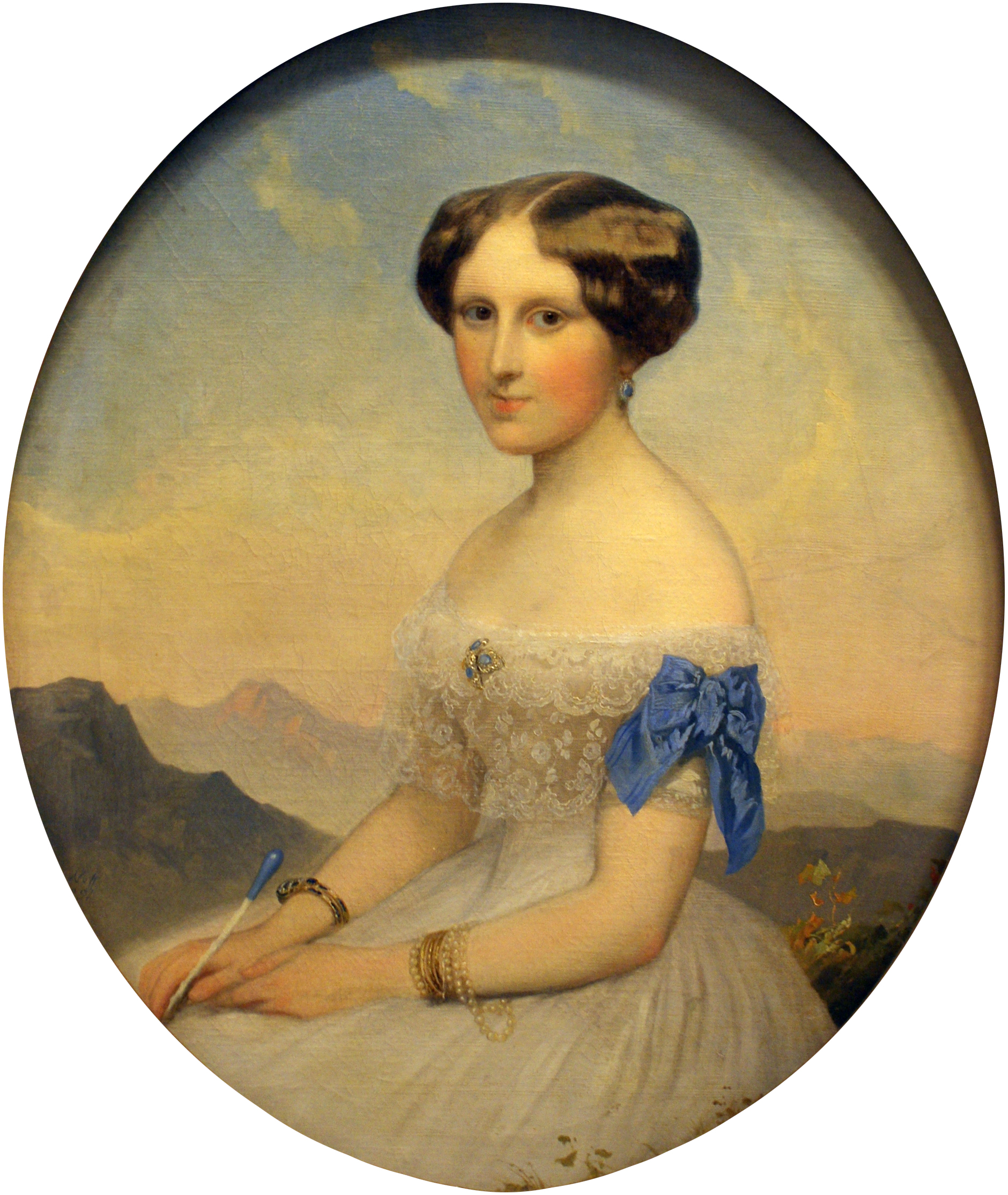
Alexandra, daughter

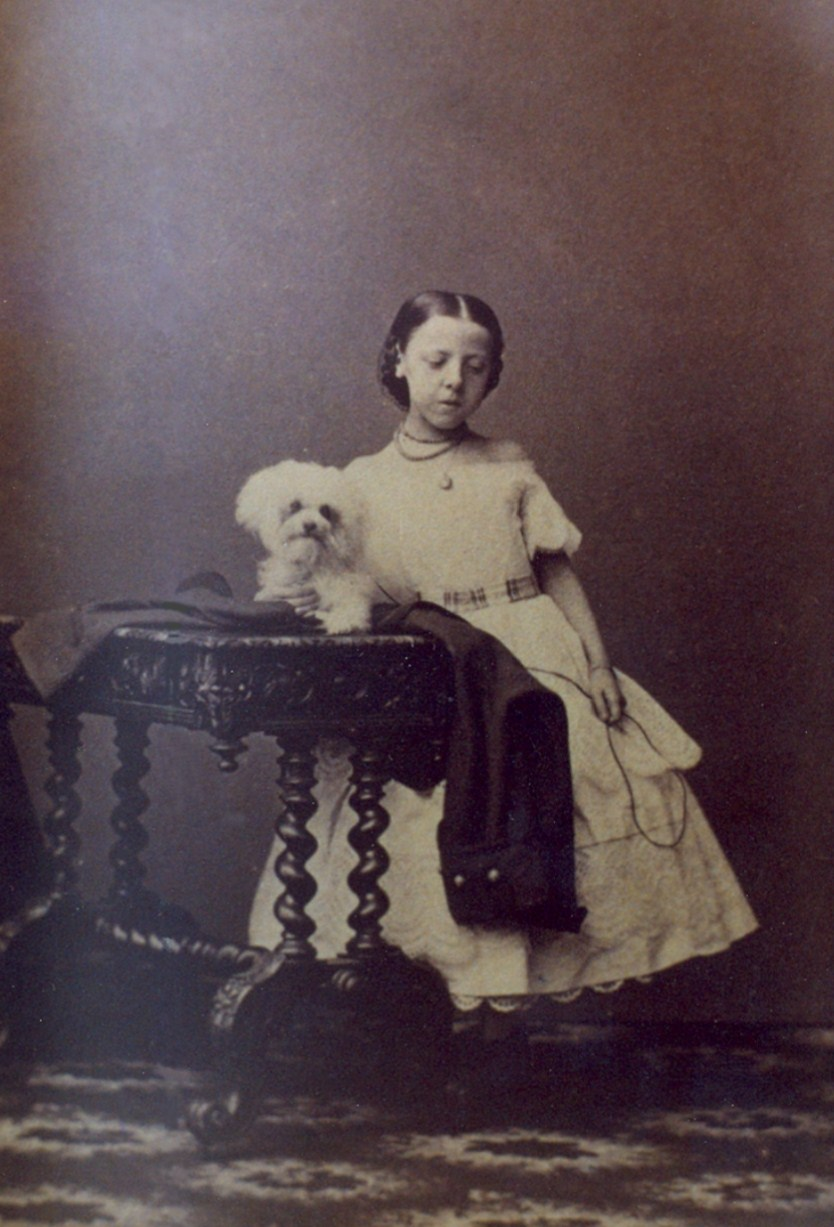
Maria, daughter

== Honours and awards ==
- Order of St. Vladimir
- Order of St. George (Fourth Class)
- Legion of Honour
- Order of St. Anna (first class)
- Gold Sword for Bravery
- Commander of the Military William Order (27 November 1815)
- Order of the White Eagle

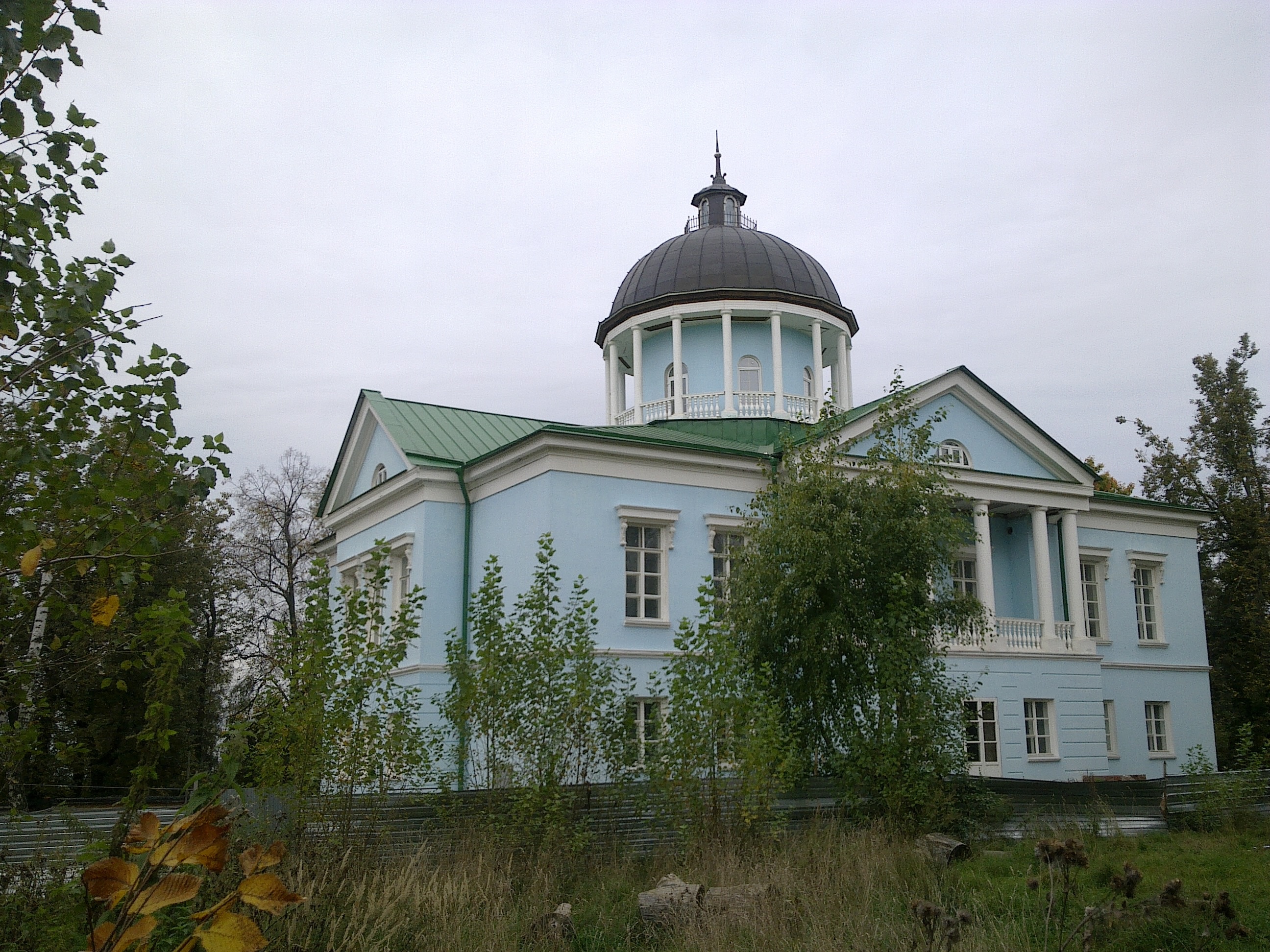
A. I. Chernyshyov's estate
