= Rokitno, West Pomeranian Voivodeship =

Rokitno
- Village
- Location within Poland
- Coordinates: 52°57′1″N 15°2′43″E
- Country: Poland
- Voivodeship: West Pomeranian
- County: Myślibórz
- Gmina: Nowogródek Pomorski

Rokitno [rɔˈkitnɔ] (German: Arnoldshof) is a village in the administrative district of Gmina Nowogródek Pomorski, within Myślibórz County, West Pomeranian Voivodeship, in north-western Poland.

For the history of the region, see History of Pomerania.
