= Pachocino =

- Settlement
- Location within Poland
- Coordinates: 52°55′35″N 15°01′34″E
- Country: Poland
- Voivodeship: West Pomeranian
- County: Myślibórz
- Gmina: Nowogródek Pomorski
- Time zone: UTC+01:00 (CET)
  - Summer (DST): UTC+02:00 (CEST)

Pachocino [paxɔˈt͡ɕinɔ] is a settlement in the administrative district of Gmina Nowogródek Pomorski, within Myślibórz County, West Pomeranian Voivodeship, in north-western Poland.

For the history of the region, see History of Pomerania.
