= Jean-Baptiste Girard (soldier) =

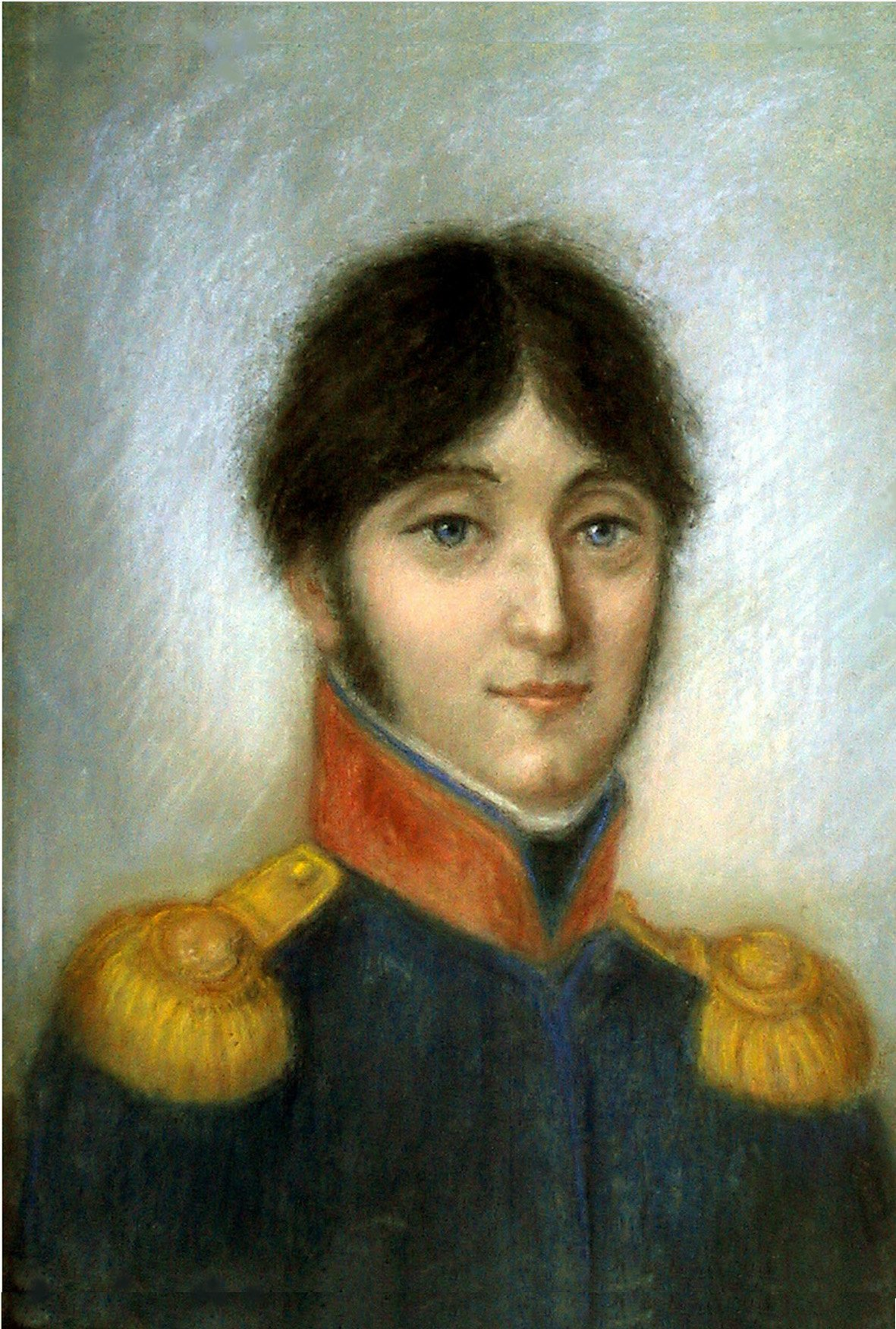
- Portrait of Girard
- Born: 21 February 1775; Aups, France
- Died: 27 June 1815 (aged 40); Paris, France
- Military career
- Allegiance: French First Republic; First French Empire
- Branch: French Revolutionary Army; French Imperial Army
- Service years: 1794–1815
- Rank: Divisional general
- Conflicts: French Revolutionary Wars; Napoleonic Wars
- Awards: Grand Officer of the Légion d'honneur

Divisional-General Jean-Baptiste Girard (French pronunciation: [ʒɑ̃ batist ʒiʁaʁ]; 21 February 1775 – 27 June 1815) was a French Army officer who served in the French Revolutionary Wars and the Napoleonic Wars.

== Biography ==
=== Early career ===
Girard entered the French Revolutionary Army during the spring of 1794. He saw active service with the Army of Italy and by 1797 he had been promoted to captain. At Marengo in 1800 Girard commanded a brigade. In 1806 after Jena he was promoted to general de brigade. Created a baron of the Empire by the Emperor on 26 October 1808. In 1809 Girard was promoted to general de division.

=== Peninsular War ===
Girard was severely wounded at Ocaña (November 1809), where he led a division of the V Corps under Marshal Mortier.

He commanded French forces at Arroyo dos Molinos (October 1811).

=== Later career ===
Girard was wounded at the Beresina and at Lützen. He commanded the Franco-Allied troops in the Battle of Hagelberg which resulted in a French defeat and Girard becoming a prisoner of war until 1814.

During the Hundred Days, Girard rallied to Napoleon I. Created a Peer of France (a member of the Hundred Days Chamber of Peers) this made him ipso facto a Count of the Empire. Girard was given command of the 7th Infantry Division. He was mortally wounded in the Battle of Ligny, where his division bore the brunt of the fighting on the French left. Girard was created Duke of Ligny by Napoleon I on 21 June 1815 (one of the Emperor's last official acts) in recognition of his services at Ligny. However, the letters patent were not delivered, and thus the title was not recognized by the Second Bourbon Restoration. He succumbed to his wounds in Paris on 27 June 1815.
