= Ławin =

- Settlement
- Location within Poland
- Coordinates: 52°53′28″N 15°6′5″E
- Country: Poland
- Voivodeship: West Pomeranian
- County: Myślibórz
- Gmina: Nowogródek Pomorski

Ławin [ˈwavin] (German: Heller) is a settlement in the administrative district of Gmina Nowogródek Pomorski, within Myślibórz County, West Pomeranian Voivodeship, in north-western Poland. It lies approximately 6 km (4 mi) south-east of Nowogródek Pomorski, 17 km (11 mi) east of Myślibórz, and 68 km (42 mi) south-east of the regional capital Szczecin.

For the history of the region, see History of Pomerania.
