= Trzciniec, Myślibórz County =

Trzciniec
- Settlement
- Location within Poland
- Coordinates: 52°51′41″N 15°06′32″E
- Country: Poland
- Voivodeship: West Pomeranian
- County: Myślibórz
- Gmina: Nowogródek Pomorski

Trzciniec [ˈtʂt͡ɕiɲɛt͡s] is a settlement in the administrative district of Gmina Nowogródek Pomorski, within Myślibórz County, West Pomeranian Voivodeship, in north-western Poland.

For the history of the region, see History of Pomerania.
