= Świątki, Myślibórz County =

Świątki
- Village
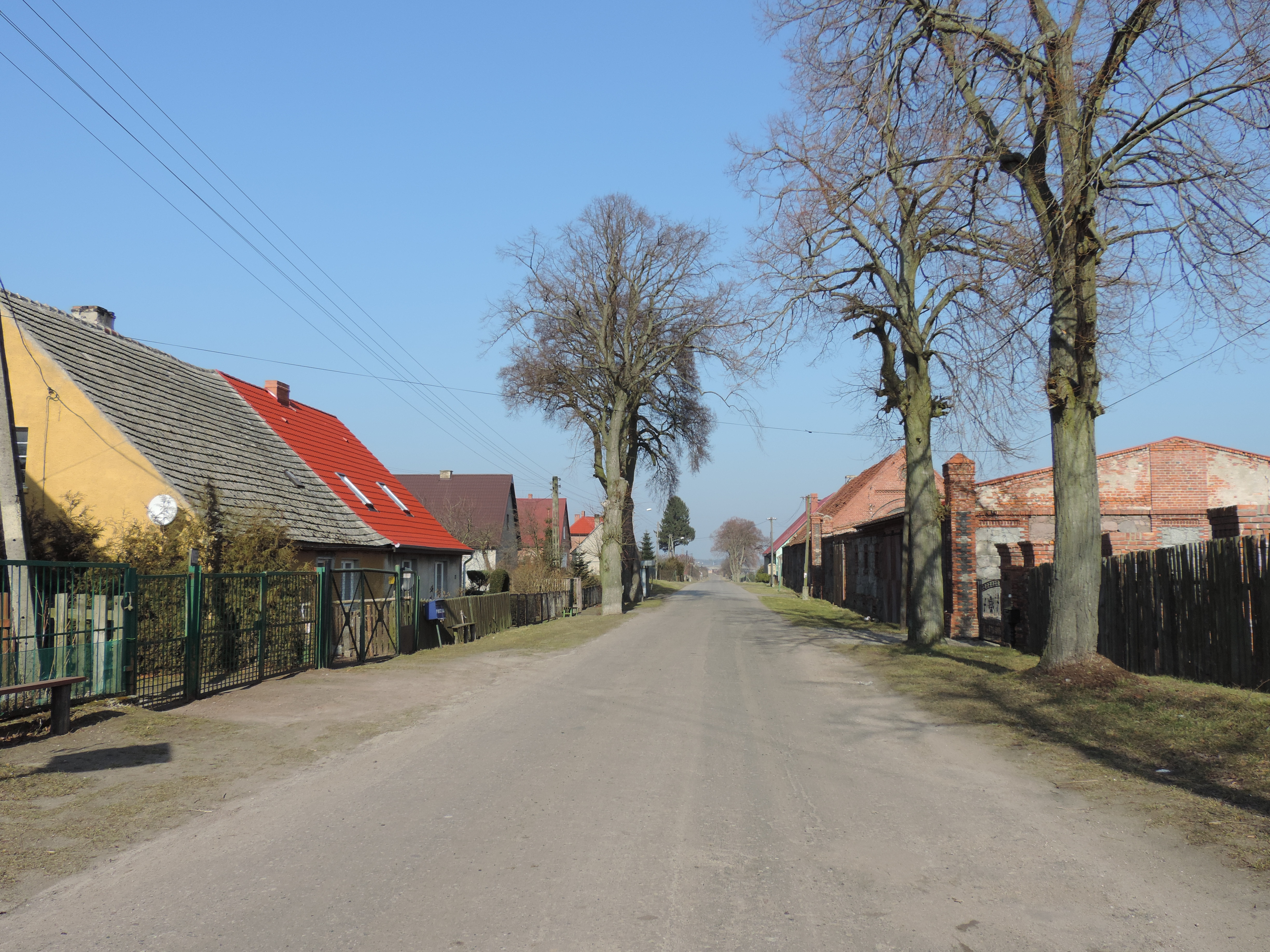

- Location within Poland
- Coordinates: 52°54′05″N 15°00′06″E
- Country: Poland
- Voivodeship: West Pomeranian
- County: Myślibórz
- Gmina: Nowogródek Pomorski

Świątki (Polish: [ˈɕfjɔntkʲi]; German: Tempelhof) is a village in the administrative district of Gmina Nowogródek Pomorski, within Myślibórz County, West Pomeranian Voivodeship, in north-western Poland.

For the history of the region, see History of Pomerania.
