= Battle of Lüneburg =

1813 battle during the War of the Sixth Coalition

- Part of the German campaign of the Sixth Coalition
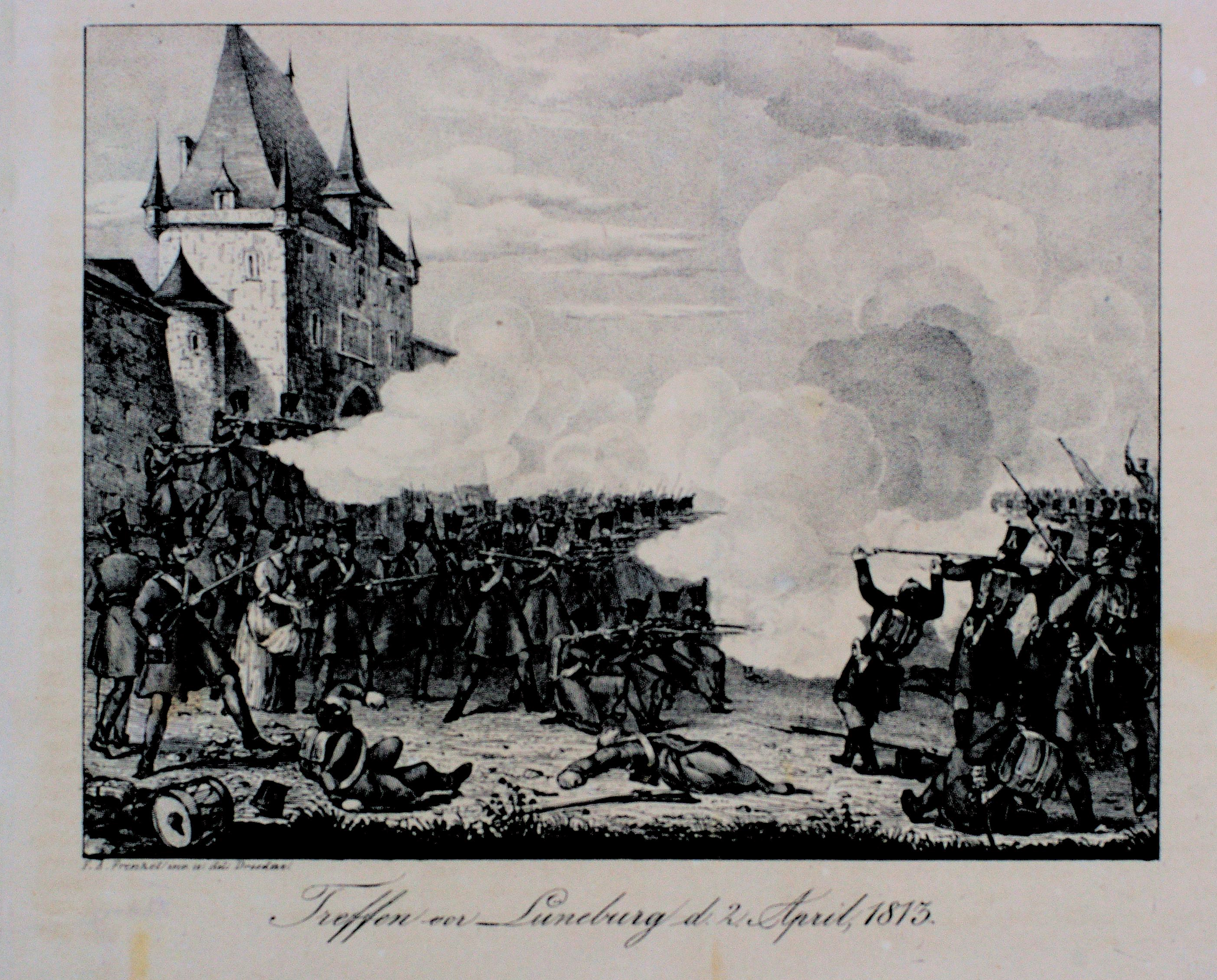
Date	2 April 1813
Location	Lüneburg, Bouches-de-l'Elbe, French Empire 53°15′9″N 10°24′52″E
Result	Coalition victory

Belligerents
Russia; Prussia	France; Saxony

Commanders and leaders
(Russian Empire) Wilhelm von Dörnberg (Kingdom of Prussia) Karl von Borcke	(First French Empire) Joseph Morand (DOW)

Units involved
	(First French Empire) 34th Division

Strength
3,100, 6 guns	2,800, 9 guns

Casualties and losses
300 killed and wounded	2,300 captured, 9 guns, 3 flags
- Location within Europe

In the Battle of Lüneburg on 2 April 1813, Allied Russians and Prussians were victorious over a French and Saxon division. The battle was the first major combat action after the retreat of the defeated French in Russia behind the Elbe. Its importance lay in the moral effect on the German public as the first success of the Allies in the wars of liberation that were now beginning.

== Background ==
After Napoleon's defeat in the Russian campaign of 1812, a vehemently anti-French mood had spread in northern Germany, starting in East Prussia in January 1813. It turned into open rebellion when, in mid-February, Prussia made a clear turn against France and Russian cavalry units swarmed across the Oder. At the end of February, this also included the Hanseatic departments annexed by France in 1810.

Severe riots broke out in Hamburg on 24 February. After the summary execution of seven arbitrarily arrested people on 2 and 3 March increased the unrest, the French evacuated the city on 12 March and the rebellion spread to Lübeck and Stade.

On 14 March, the Russian cavalry leader Friedrich Karl von Tettenborn appeared at the head of 1,300 Cossacks with two guns in Ludwigslust and persuaded Mecklenburg to switch sides from the Confederation of the Rhine to the Allies. He then pushed the French forces withdrawn from Stralsund under General Joseph Morand across the Elbe. On 18 March, Tettenborn moved into Hamburg. At the same time, Russian cavalry troops roamed through Harburg, Stade and Lüneburg, celebrated by the residents. Lübeck and Lauenburg re-established the constitutional relationships that had been abolished by France, and the representatives of the estates of the former duchies of Bremen and Verden met to decide to arm the people. In this situation, on 21 March, the citizens of Lüneburg, a town of 10,000 people drove the French officials out of their city and began to raise volunteer troops.

On Napoleon's orders, General Dominique Vandamme concentrated 25,000 men on the lower Weser, at the same time restoring order in the Hanseatic departments. He arrived in Bremen on 27 March and ordered Morand to go to Tostedt to fight insurgents and Cossacks. These had to withdraw to Hamburg. Now Morand received the order to carry out a punitive expedition against Lüneburg. There, armed citizens and Alexander von Benckendorff's Cossacks had prevented an occupation of the city by General Wathier's flying column on 28 March.

The further away Morand's 34th Division was from Bremen, the more he was surrounded and attacked by the Cossacks of Benckendorff's Russian corps. Due to his experience in organizing uprisings and in leading the Little War, Wilhelm von Dörnberg, who had been appointed Russian general, had previously been given the task of triggering a general uprising in the Hanover area, but his crossing of the Elbe near Werben on 26 March failed. When it became apparent that Lüneburg was Morand's marching goal, the supreme commander of the right wing of the Russo-Prussian armies, General Peter Wittgenstein, sent Dörnberg's corps across the Elbe near Lenzen on 31 March in support of the rebellious city. Dörnberg quickly approached his objective from the south-east, diverting troops to Boizenburg to set up a line of retreat.

== Opposing forces ==
Morand's 34th Division numbered about 2,800 men with nine guns, including a hastily assembled cavalry force of 75 consisting of dragoons, chasseurs, mounted douaniers and gendarmes. The core of his division were two battalions (of three) of the Saxon infantry regiment "Prinz Maximilian" and a Saxon battery.

Dörnberg had an infantry battalion and a half battery with four guns from the Prussian Borstell brigade and his Russian troops were a Jäger battalion, four squadrons of hussars and two dragoons and the Benckendorff corps with three Cossack and one Bashkir platoon and two guns, a total of 1,100 infantry and about 1,300 horsemen, implied. Before the attack on Lüneburg, the Russian patrol force of Alexander Chernyshyov, which consisted of 1,800 horsemen with four guns, joined with him.

== Battle ==
On 1 April, Morand attacked Lüneburg from the west. The disorganized resistance of armed citizens at the medieval city gates was quickly broken, many were arrested and in the evening Morand appointed fifty of them to be shot the next day. On the same day, the Dörnberg corps had reached Lüchow and that under Benckendorff had reached Dannenberg. Both made an appointment with Chernyshyov, whose cavalry had crossed the Elbe near Bählau on 31 March and were in Wustrow, to conquer Lüneburg on 2 April.

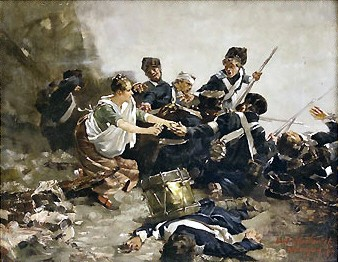
Ludwig von Herterich: Johanna Stegen, the Heroine of Lüneburg (scene from the Napoleonic Wars), 1887

When Cossacks showed up at the southern city gate at 6 am, Morand thought he was dealing with patrols as before. He sent two guns with an infantry cover and his 75 horsemen in front of the city to drive off the enemy. His troops ran into one of Dörnberg's traps: surprised, they saw themselves exposed to a massive flank attack by Russian hussars, lost their guns and were taken prisoner except for part of the cavalry. Only in the late morning did Morand realize that a regular Russian-Prussian infantry and artillery force was attacking Lüneburg with the aim of conquering it. Meanwhile, a city gate was in the hands of Prussian fusiliers under Major Karl von Borcke. While fighting broke out at other city gates, armed citizens freed those sentenced to be shot and attacked enemy soldiers in the streets. Morand, already wounded, lost track and ordered a retreat from the city at noon to a French force stationed west of the New Gate. His order could no longer be obeyed by any of his detachments, because some were locked in various gates and buildings by the Prussian and Russian troops pushing into the city and were already beginning to capitulate. Morand now attempted a recapture from the outside. The attack, in which he was badly wounded this time, failed after initial successes. Here it came to the now famous act of the Lüneburg bourgeois daughter Johanna Stegen. She supplied Prussian fusiliers with urgently needed ammunition, which she had salvaged from an abandoned ammunition wagon on the battlefield at the risk of her life. In the afternoon Russian horsemen had surrounded Morand's troops. An honorable surrender accepted by Dörnberg could not be enforced by the Saxon officers because of the French's refusal to cease fire. After a failed attempt to break through to retreat to Reppenstedt, the Russian-Prussian artillery, reinforced with captured cannons, began to shoot up the surrounded troops. Around 5 pm, Morand's entire force surrendered and was taken prisoner. The French-Saxon division was destroyed with the loss of 2,300 prisoners, 9 guns and 3 flags, against an Allied loss of 300 killed and wounded, including 46 Prussians.

== Aftermath ==
The very next day, the victors were forced to retreat in front of an 11,000-strong division advancing north on the left bank of the Elbe under Marshal Davout. Dörnberg's corps crossed the Elbe near Boizenburg with the prisoners and numerous refugees from Lüneburg, including Johanna Stegen. Morand died there on April 5 of his wounds. Davout appeared in Lüneburg on April 4 and showed unexpected leniency towards the population, contenting himself with the imposition of a contribution and general disarmament. Dörnberg's and Tettenborn's announcements that a captured French soldier would be shot or that such an official would be hanged for every German summarily shot may have contributed to the renunciation of worse measures. When Vandamme withdrew from the seething area between the Elbe and Aller in the coming days, Dörnberg again occupied Lüneburg on 11 April. Only when Vandamme moved to conquer Hamburg in May did Lüneburg have to be vacated by the Allies for a long time.

The news of the annihilation of Morand's corps spread quickly in northern Germany, triggering jubilation and confidence in victory. Unusual was the mention of the interaction of Russian and Prussian soldiers with armed citizens and, for the first time, a woman as a participant in the fight. The new character of the war, which on the Prussian side was no longer only waged by professional soldiers, was clearly shown in an obituary in the Vossische Zeitung for the first fallen volunteer jäger Georg Haase, a son of the agricultural reformer Georg Haase, a son of the agricultural reformer Georg Friedrich Haase, known for the introduction of animal vaccinations and the liberation of farmers in Pomerania. The Haases announced to the public that their son died "death for fatherland, German freedom, national honor and our beloved king"; they ended by saying: “The loss of such a child is hard; but it is a consolation for us that we too were able to give birth to a son for the great holy purpose. We deeply feel the necessity of such sacrifices.” Another new feature was the awarding of a similar award for officers and soldiers of the Prussian army, the first Iron Cross, by King Frederick William III. In addition to Major Borcke, a number of officers, non-commissioned officers and privates received the Iron Cross 2nd Class.

While Prussia presented itself to the public as a pioneer of the liberation struggle, the role of the Rhine Confederation state of Saxony in the suppression of the uprising in northern Germany was badly noted. When Saxon Foreign Minister Ludwig Senfft wanted Prussia and Russia to recognize Saxony's neutrality in April, his negotiating partners had to put it to the test that the soldiers of his King Frederick Augustus I of Saxony were fighting the Prussians right in the streets of Lüneburg. The battle of Lüneburg seemed exemplary to contemporaries in terms of cause and outcome. German historiography kept this memory alive well into the 20th century.
