= Lipin (surname) =

Lipin (Russian: Липин) is a Russian masculine surname, its feminine counterpart is Lipina. Notable people with the surname include:

- Alexander Lipin (born 1985), Kazakhstani ice hockey player
- Maksim Lipin (born 1992), Estonian footballer

Steven Lipin (born 1963) CEO of Gladstone Place Partners and former partner at Brunswick Group.
