= Karl August Ferdinand von Borcke =

Prussian general

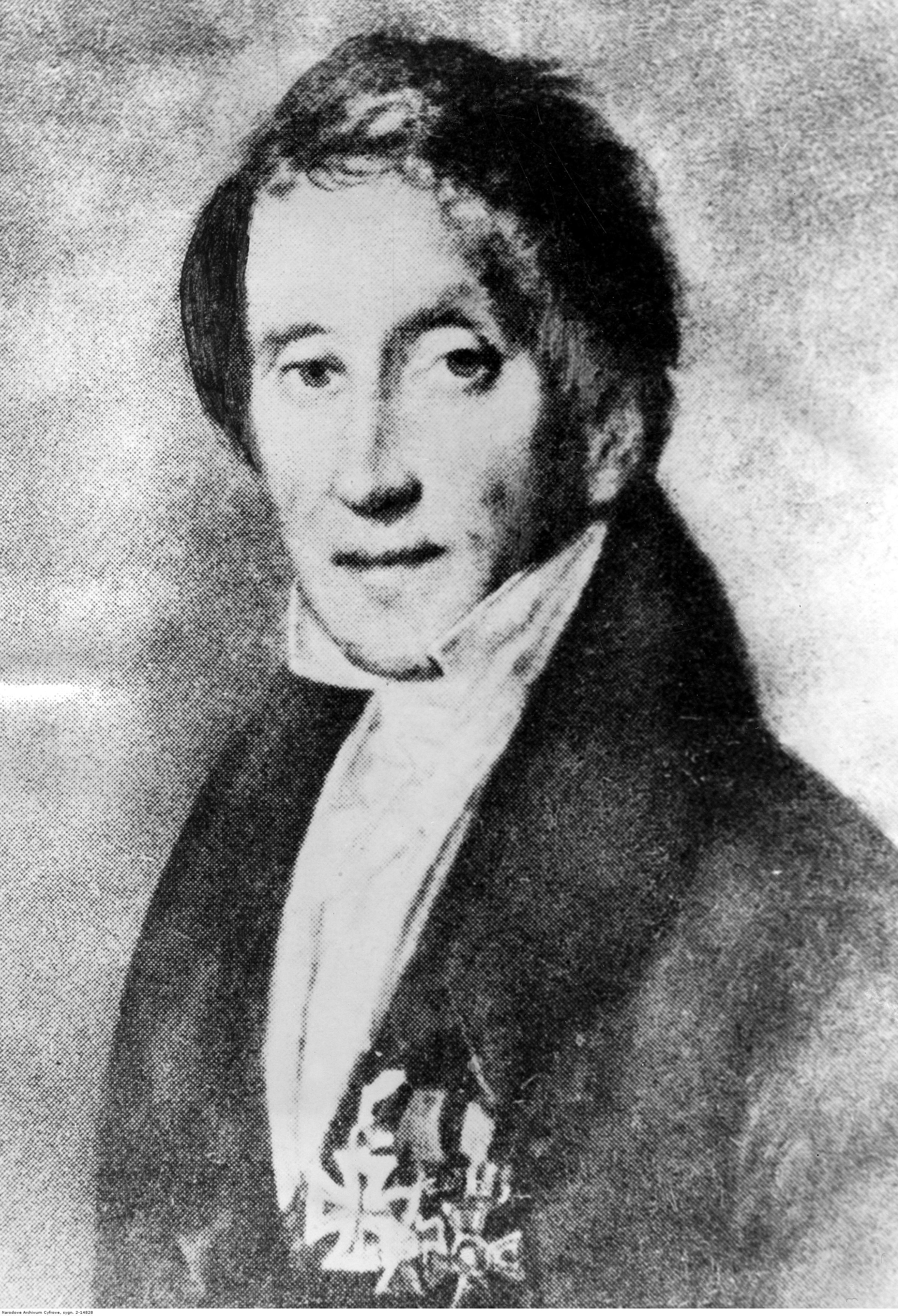
- Born: 18 February 1776; Stargard, Province of Pomerania, Kingdom of Prussia
- Died: 15 December 1830 (aged 54); Stargard, Prussia
- Military career
- Allegiance: (Kingdom of Prussia) Prussia
- Service years: 1789-1830
- Rank: Lieutenant general
- Commands: Infantry Regiment No 12; 4th Division
- Conflicts: Napoleonic Wars
- Awards: Pour le Mérite (1812); Iron Cross (1813); Order of the Sword (Sweden); Order of St. Vladimir (Russia); Order of the Red Eagle (1815)

Karl August Ferdinand von Borcke (18 February 1776 – 15 December 1830) was a Prussian general and the first recipient of the Iron Cross.

== Biography ==
Borcke was born in Stargard, Province of Pomerania, Kingdom of Prussia (today Poland) to Ernst Gottlieb Kurt von Borcke (1757–1816) and Anna Margarethe née Greinert (1750–1804). He attended school at Stargard and joined the Prussian Army in 1789 as an officer's cadet. Borcke took part in Napoleon's Russian campaign as a member of the Prussian contingent allied to Napoleon. After Prussia changed sides in 1813 he fought in the battles of Katzbach and Leipzig. He received the Iron Cross II class for his deployment in a battle at Lüneburg on 21 April 1813, the first to be honored after its foundation by King Frederick William III of Prussia on 10 March 1813. Borcke commanded the Prussian 9th Infantry Brigade of the Third Corps during the Hundred Days Campaign against Napoleon and fought in the battle of Ligny and was then the commander of the Fortress of Luxembourg in 1815.

Borcke was married to Ernestine Johanna Christiane née von Broesigke (1764–1836) since 1806, they had no children. He died in a hunting accident at his hometown.

== Honours and awards ==
- Iron Cross second class (Battle of Lüneburg, 21 April 1813)
- Iron Cross first class (for his part in the Battle of Leipzig)
- Order of the Sword
- Order of St Vladimir (Russia)
- Order of the Red Eagle (1815)
