= Hagelberg =

Coordinates: 52°08′N 12°32′E

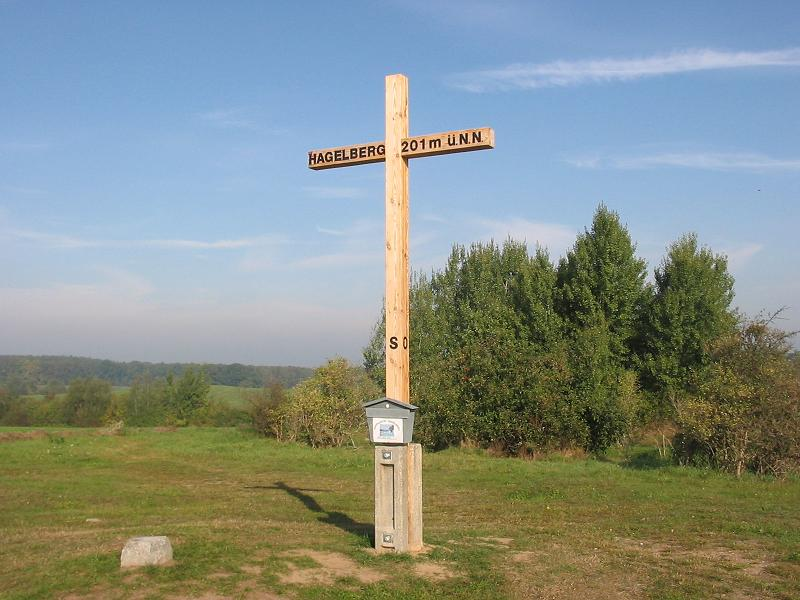
- Hagelberg peak

Geography
- Location: Brandenburg, Germany

Hagelberg is a hill of Brandenburg, Germany.
