= Sidonia von Borcke =

Pomeranian witch trial victim (1548–1620)

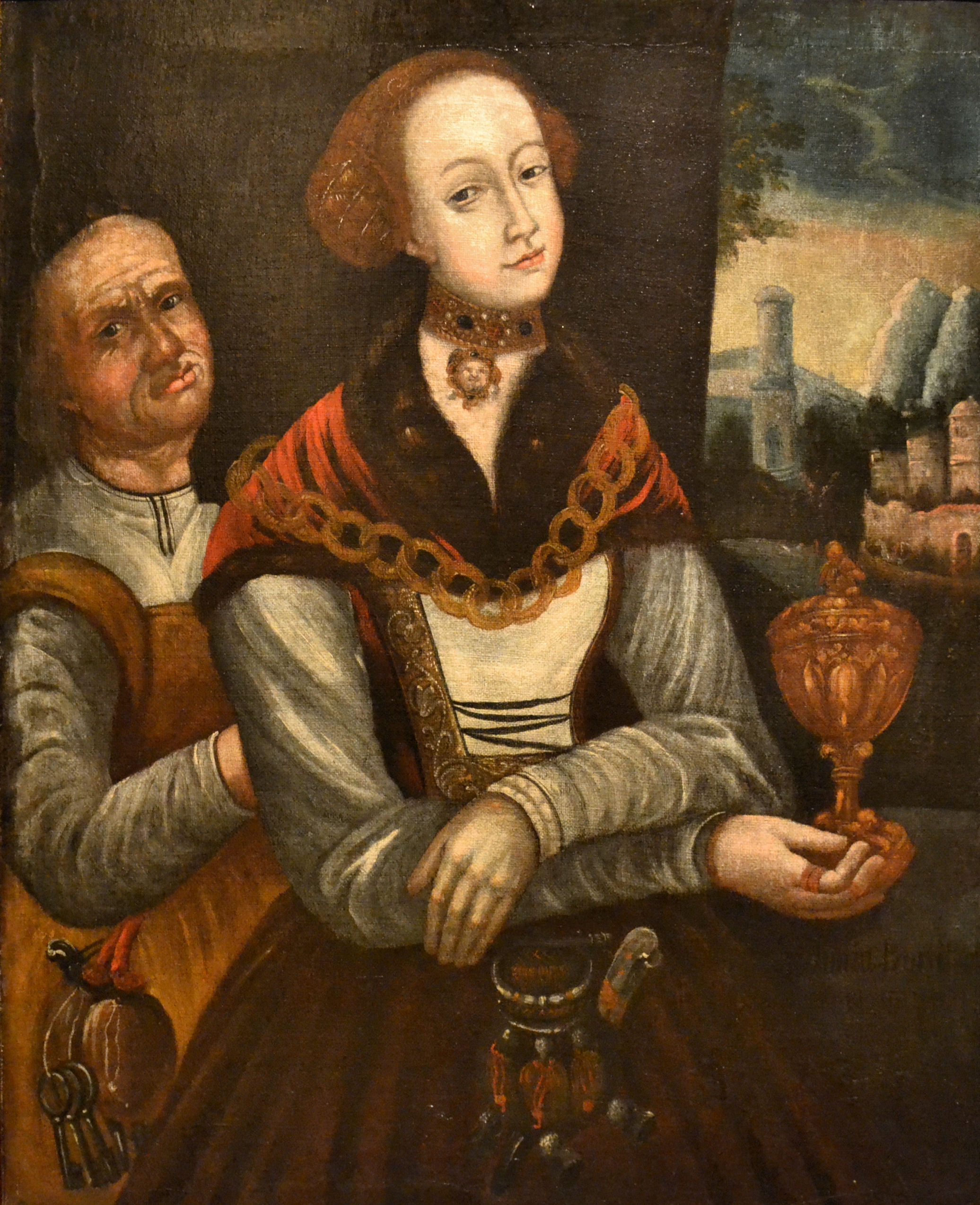
- Portrait of an unknown woman, said to be of a young von Borcke and her servant, after an original painting by Lucas Cranach the Elder.
- Born: 1548; Stramehl, Duchy of Pomerania
- Died: 1620 (aged 71–72); Stettin, Duchy of Pomerania
- Noble family: von Borcke
- Father: Otto von Borcke zu Stramehl-Regenwalde
- Mother: Anna von Schwiechelt

Sidonia von Borcke (1548–1620) was a Pomeranian noblewoman who was tried and executed for witchcraft in the city of Stettin (today Szczecin, Poland). In posthumous legends, she is depicted as a femme fatale, and she has entered English literature as Sidonia the Sorceress. She had lived in various towns and villages throughout the country.

== Life ==
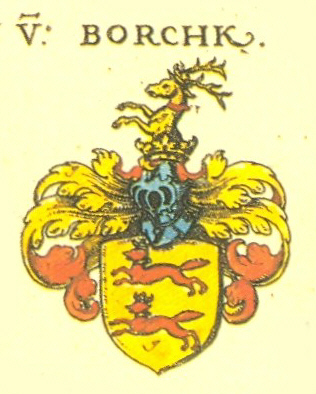
The coat of arms of the von Borcke family, showing two wolves wearing golden crowns.

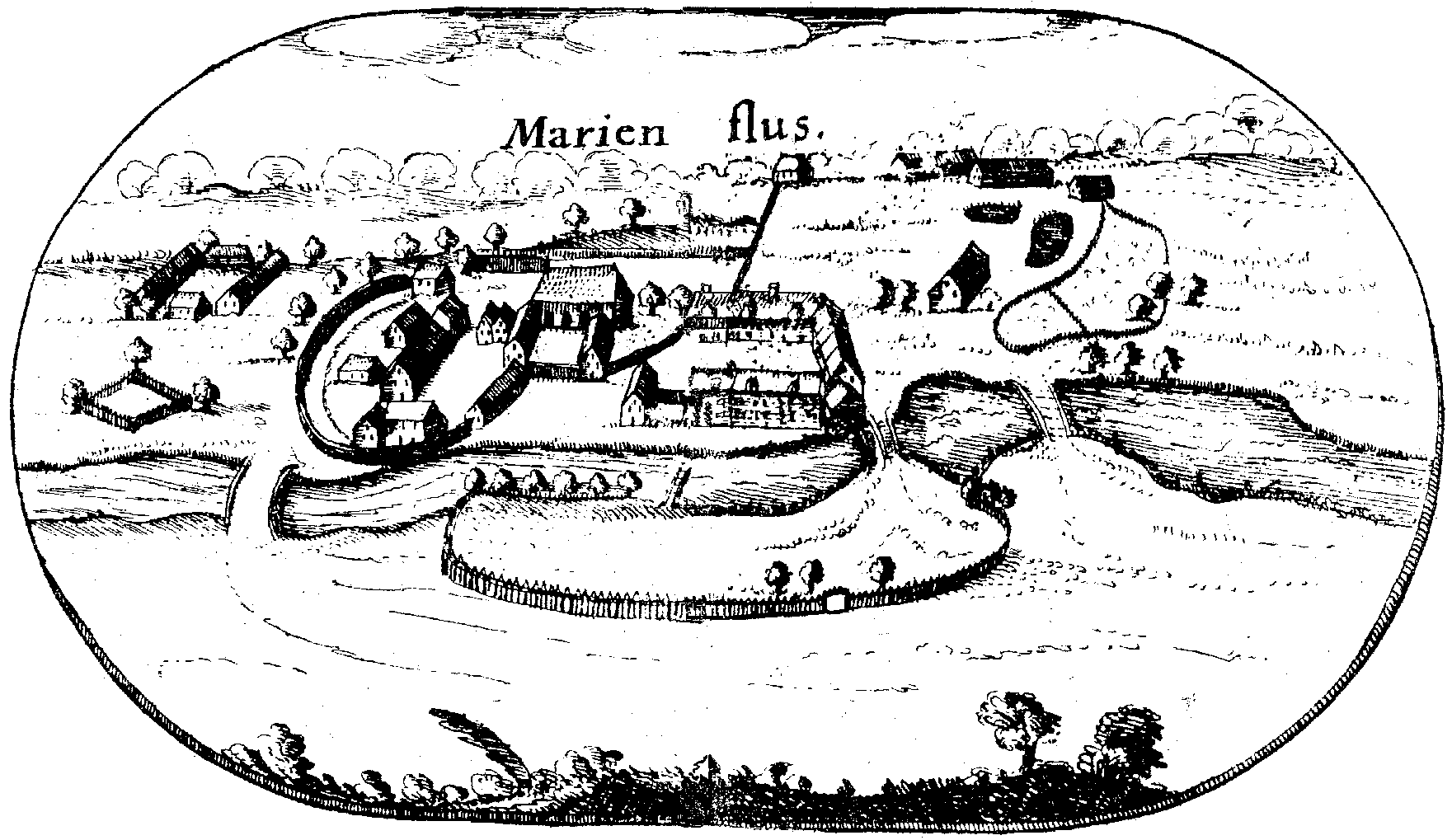
The Marienfließ Abbey in 1618.

Sidonia von Borcke was born in 1548 into a wealthy noble Pomeranian family. Her father, Otto von Borcke zu Stramehl-Regenwalde, died in 1551, and her mother, Anna von Schwiechelt, died in 1568.

After the death of her sister in 1600 she took residence in 1604 in the Lutheran Noble Damsels' Foundation in Marienfließ Abbey which, since 1569 and following the Protestant Reformation, was a convent for unmarried noblewomen.

Before that she had been involved in several lawsuits concerning support payments which, she claimed, were owed to her. Defendants in the suits were her brother, Ulrich, and Johann Friedrich, Duke of Pomerania (died 1600). One of these suits was even heard in the imperial court in Vienna.

While living in Marienfließ, Sidonia engaged in several private and judicial conflicts with her (mostly younger) co-residents and with the administrative staff of the abbey. When in 1606 she was dismissed from her post as an Unterpriorin (sub-prioress) by the convent's prioress, Magdalena von Petersdorff, she appealed her dismissal to Bogislaw XIII, Duke of Pomerania.

Bogislaw sent a Commission, headed by Joachim von Wedel, to investigate the dispute. The interaction between the Commission and Sidonia soon metamorphosed into a major feud. Von Wedel met in private with the Marienfließ Hauptmann (captain), Johannes von Hechthausen, to consider "getting rid of this poisonous snake." The feud ended with the death of Bogislaw XIII in 1606 and the deaths of von Petersdorff, von Wedel, and von Hechthausen (all in 1609).

Two years later, Sidonia filed complaints against the new prioress, Agnes von Kleist. These complaints were addressed to Philip II, Bogislaw's successor. Like his predecessor, Philip sent a Commission to investigate the complaints — a Commission headed by Jost von Borcke, a relative of Sidonia's who had already been humiliated when he was involved in prior lawsuits brought by Sidonia.

The new Commission did not succeed in calming the dispute, and Jost von Borcke described the situation at Marienfließ as one of chaos, mistrust, name-calling, and occasional violence. Philip II died in 1618 and was succeeded by Duke Francis I. Jost von Borcke was in good standing at Francis's court and remained head of the investigating Commission.

In July 1619, a dispute between Sidonia and Unterpriorin (sub-prioress) Dorothea von Stettin escalated out of control during a mass, and both women were arrested. Dorothea von Stettin then accused Sidonia of witchcraft, specifically of forcing a former Marienfließ factotum, Wolde Albrechts, to ask the devil about her (Sidonia's) future.

Wolde Albrechts made her living from fortune-telling and begging after she lost her position at Marienfließ (this loss was a consequence of the death of Johannes von Hechthausen). She had travelled with gypsies in her youth, was known to have had several unstable sexual relationships, and was unmarried with an illegitimate child.

Dorothea von Stettin persuaded Anna von Apenburg, her Marienfließ roommate, to support her accusation of Sidonia. According to contemporary law, the Constitutio Criminalis Carolina, two eyewitnesses were sufficient to convict both Sidonia and Wolde. Anna, however, withdrew her support of the accusation when she was asked to repeat her statement under oath.

== Trials ==
The trials of Sidonia von Borcke and Wolde Albrechts were held at the court in Stettin. These trials are well documented, with more than a thousand pages of the original trial record available in an archive in Greifswald (Rep 40 II Nr.37 Bd.I-III). The recent unexpected deaths of several Pomeranian dukes, along with widespread superstition, had created an atmosphere in which the public was prepared to blame the dukes' deaths on Sidonia's alleged witchcraft. This bias was strengthened when the Pomeranian dynasty became extinct in 1637.

=== Wolde Albrechts ===
The trial of Wolde Albrechts was a preface to the trial of Sidonia.

Albrechts was arrested on 28 July 1619. On 18 August, she was charged with maleficium and Teufelsbuhlschaft (i.e., sexual relations with the devil).

On 2 September, torture was admitted as a legitimate means of interrogation by the supreme court at Magdeburg.

On 7 September, Albrechts confessed under torture and accused Sidonia and two other women of witchcraft. She repeated these confessions in the presence of Sidonia during Sidonia's trial, which began on 1 October 1619.

Albrechts was burned at the stake on 9 October 1619.

=== Sidonia von Borcke ===
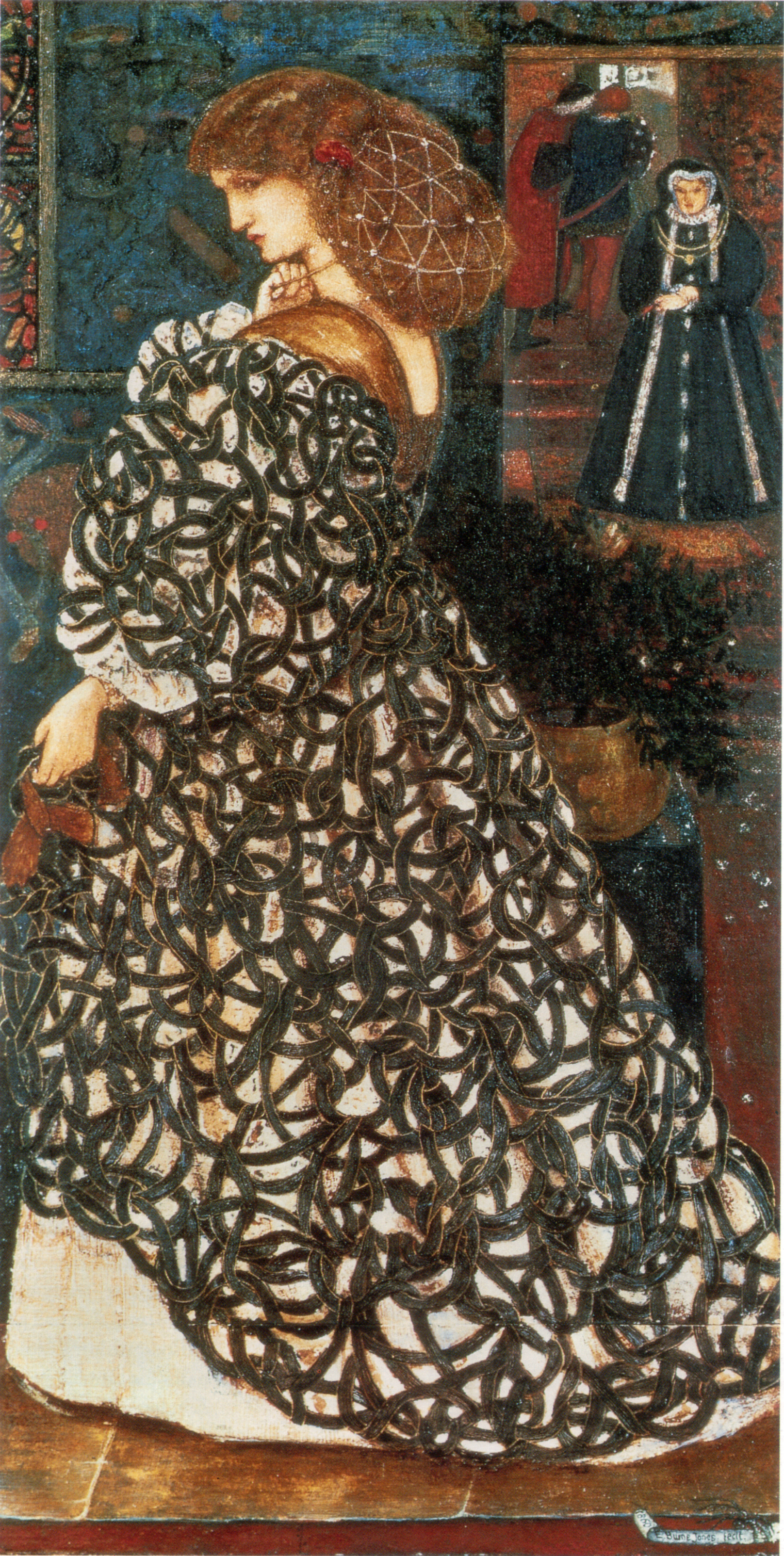
Sidonia Von Bork by Edward Burne-Jones, 1860 (Tate Gallery, London).

Sidonia, who had been imprisoned in the Marienfließ Abbey, attempted to escape but failed. She also attempted suicide, but this also failed.

On 18 November 1619, she was transferred to a prison in Stettin.

In December, 72 charges were brought against her. The most important of these were:

- murder of her nephew, Otto von Borcke
- murder of a priest, David Lüdecke
- murder of duke Philip II of Pomerania-Stettin (died 1618)
- murder of Magdalena von Petersdorff, prioress of Marienfließ
- murder of Matthias Winterfeld, gatekeeper at Marienfließ
- murder of Consistorial Counsellor Dr. Heinrich Schwalenberg
- paralyzation of Katharina Hanow, a noblewoman at Marienfließ
- consultation with soothsayers
- knowledge of future and distant events
- sexual contacts with the devil (who allegedly materialized in animals, such as Sidonia's cat, whose name was Chim)
- magical practices, such as praying the "Judas psalm" (Psalm 109) and crossing brooms beneath a kitchen table

In January 1620, a man named Elias Pauli was appointed as Sidonia's defender. Although he presented a defense showing that those allegedly murdered had died natural deaths, he also dissociated himself from statements of Sidonia which had incriminated Jost von Borcke and other officials.

About fifty witnesses were questioned at the trial.

On 28 June, the Magdeburg court permitted the Stettin court to use torture. When torture was applied on 28 July, Sidonia confessed. The verdict of death was read to her when she was dragged to the execution site and her body was "ruptured" four times with pliers.

When Sidonia recanted her confession, she was tortured anew on 16 August.

On 1 September 1620, the final verdict was rendered. Sidonia was sentenced to death by beheading and subsequent burning of her body. The sentence was carried out in Stettin, outside the mill gate. The exact date of her death is not known.

== In fiction ==
After Sidonia's death, her fate became legendary and was even more strongly associated with the extinction of the House of Pomerania.

Portrayed as a femme fatale, she became the subject of several fictional works in German and English, especially during the 19th century. Johann Wolfgang von Goethe's brother-in-law, Christian August Vulpius, in 1812 included Sidonia in his book Pantheon berühmter und merkwürdiger Frauen (Pantheon of Famous and Noteworthy Women). A Gothic romance, Sidonia von Bork, die Klosterhexe, was written in 1847–1848 by Wilhelm Meinhold, a Pomeranian priest and author. It was published in three volumes in 1848. (Note: Full title in German: Sidonia von Bork, die Klosterhexe, angebliche Vertilgerin des gesamten herzoglich-pommerschen Regentenhauses (preview at google books))

An English translation of this novel, titled Sidonia the Sorceress, was published in 1849 by Oscar Wilde's mother, Jane Wilde (later known as Lady Wilde). This translation was also published by William Morris in his Kelmscott Press in 1894. (Note: Full title of the English version: Sidonia the Sorceress: The Supposed Destroyer of the Whole Reigning Ducal House of Pomerania (full text at Internet Archive, Google Books and Project Gutenberg). Also referred to as The Convent Witch, a translation of the German subtitle Die Klosterhexe (Daguerreotype of 1848))

The English translations achieved a popularity in Great Britain that was unmatched by any other German book in British literary history. Especially in the Pre-Raphaelite Brotherhood, whose members included William Morris, Dante Gabriel Rossetti, and Edward Burne-Jones, enthusiasm for Sidonia as a Medusa-type femme fatale was widespread. Rossetti is said to have referred to and quoted from the novel "incessantly". Several members created paintings based on the novel, the most famous being Sidonia Von Bork and Clara Von Bork by Burne-Jones in 1860. For his Sidonia painting, Rossetti's mistress Fanny Cornforth served as the model.

Other authors who wrote novels based Sidonia's life were Albert Emil Brachvogel (1824–1878) and Paul Jaromar Wendt (1840–1919). Theodor Fontane (1819-1898) had prepared a novel, Sidonie von Borcke, since 1879. However, he did not finish it. The fragments of it were published in 1966.

The character also appears in the Aleksander Majkowski's novel Żëcé i przigòdë Remùsa (The Life and Adventures of Remus) published in 1938, considered to be the most important work of Kashubian literature.

In 2010, Polish heavy metal band Crystal Viper included a song dedicated to Sidonia titled Sydonia Bork on its studio album Legends.

The fate of Sydonia and her portraits is one of the themes of Leszek Herman's 2015 debut novel titled Sedinum. Wiadomość z podziemi (Sedinum. Message from the underworld).

In 2023 Elżbieta Cherezińska's bestseller book Sydonia. Słowo się rzekło (Sidonia. The word has been spoken) was published, which received an award in the historical novel category of the 9th edition of the 2023 Lubimyczytac.pl Book of the Year Poll, the largest reader poll in Poland.

On the anniversary of her death, members of the Szczecin Historical Society lay flowers near the site of her execution.

== See also ==
- Pomerania
- Wilhelm Meinhold
- Witch-hunt

== Bibliography ==
- Riedl, Gerda (2004). "'Alles von rechts wegen!' Frühneuzeitliches Hexenprozeß-(un-)wesen am Beispiel des Falles der Sidonia von Borcke". In George, Marion; Rudolph, Andrea (eds.). Hexen: Historische Faktizität und fiktive Bildlichkeit (in German). J.H.Röll Verlag. ISBN 3-89754-225-0.
- Rudolph, Andrea (2004). "Wilhelm Meinholds Hexenroman 'Sidonia von Bork' (1847/48) - eine Abrechnung mit der libertinen Frauenemanzipation als ein 'Leiden unserer Zeit'". In George, Marion; Rudolph, Andrea (eds.). Hexen: Historische Faktizität und fiktive Bildlichkeit (in German). J.H.Röll Verlag. ISBN 3-89754-225-0.
- Inachim, Kyra (2008). "Herrschaft der letzten Greifengeneration". Die Geschichte Pommerns (in German). Rostock: Hinstorff. ISBN 978-3-356-01044-2.
- Branig, Hans; Buchholz, Werner (1997). Geschichte Pommerns: Vom Werden des neuzeitlichen Staates bis zum Verlust der staatlichen Selbständigkeit, 1300-1648 (in German). Böhlau. ISBN 3-412-07189-7.
- Hildisch, Johannes (1980). Die Münzen der pommerschen Herzöge von 1569 bis zum Erlöschen des Greifengeschlechtes (in German). Böhlau. ISBN 3-412-04679-5.
- O'Neill, Patrick (1985). Ireland and Germany: A study in literary relations. P. Lang. ISBN 0-8204-0173-0.
- Nürnberger, Helmuth; Fontane, Theodor (1996). "Sidonie v. Borcke". In Nürnberger, Helmuth (ed.). Theodor Fontane. Sämtliche Romane, Erzählungen, Gedichte, Nachgelassenes (in German). Hanser, Carl GmbH + Co. ISBN 3-446-18300-0.
- Vulpius, Christian August (1812). "Sidonia von Borke". Pantheon berühmter und merkwürdiger Frauen (in German). Leipzig: Hahnsche Verlagsbuchhandlung.
- Peterson, William S. (1984). "A19 William Meinhold, Sidonia the Sorceress". A bibliography of the Kelmscott Press. Oxford University Press. ISBN 978-0-19-818199-6.
- Bridgwater, Patrick (2000). "Who's Afraid of Sidonia von Bork?". In Stark, Susanne (ed.). The novel in Anglo-German context: cultural cross-currents and affinities; papers from the conference held at the University of Leeds from 15 to 17 September 1997. Rodopi. ISBN 90-420-0698-6.
