= Lipin, West Pomeranian Voivodeship =

Lipin
- Settlement
- Location within Poland
- Coordinates: 52°55′33″N 15°07′01″E
- Country: Poland
- Voivodeship: West Pomeranian
- County: Myślibórz
- Gmina: Nowogródek Pomorski
- Time zone: UTC+01:00 (CET)
  - Summer (DST): UTC+02:00 (CEST)
- Area Code: (+48) 95
- Vehicle registration: ZMY

Lipin [ˈlipin] (German: Lindwerder) is a settlement in the administrative district of Gmina Nowogródek Pomorski, within Myślibórz County, West Pomeranian Voivodeship, in north-western Poland.

For the history of the region, see History of Pomerania.
