= Nowogródek Pomorski =

- Village
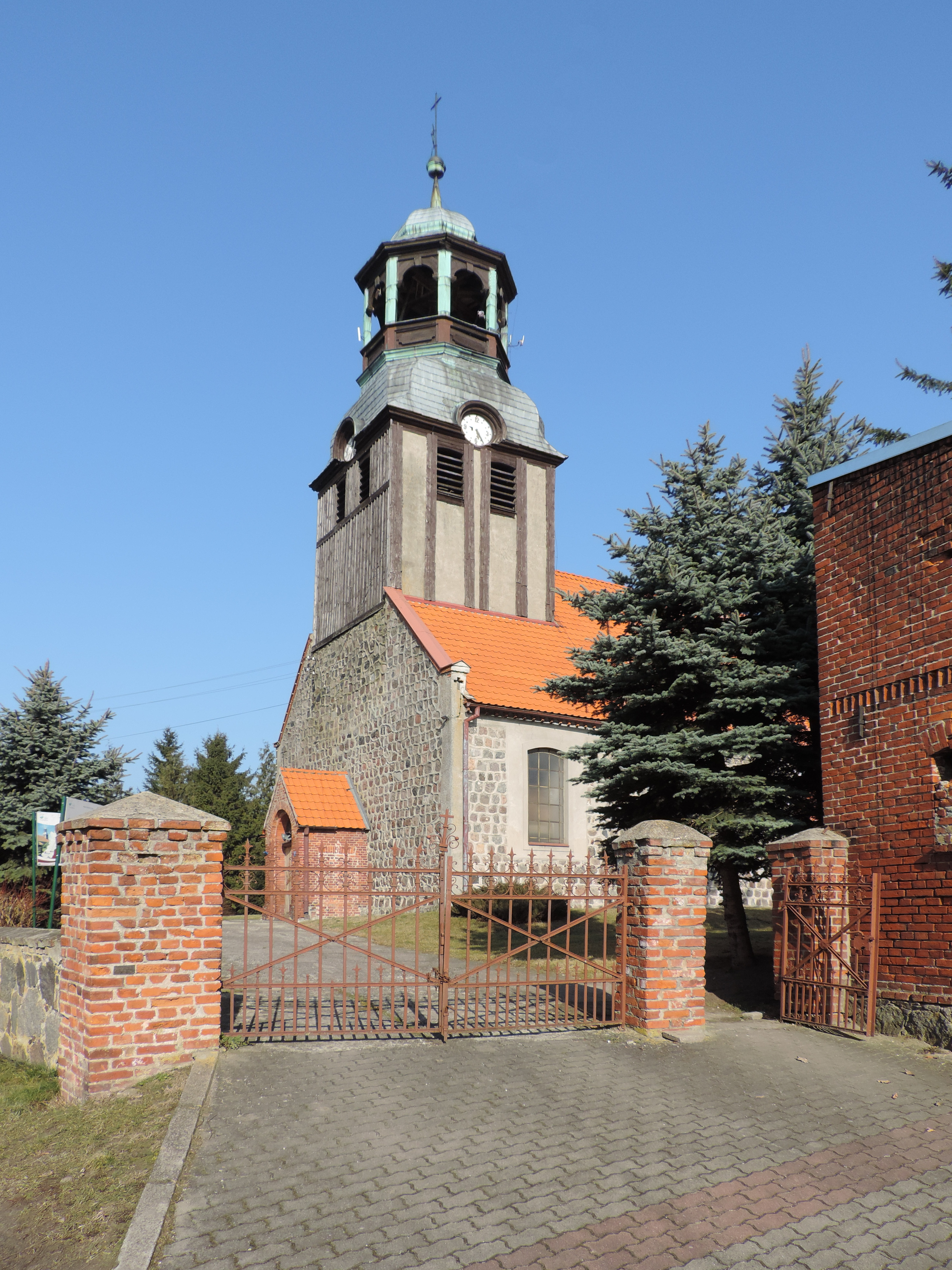
- Church of Our Lady Queen of Poland in Nowogródek Pomorski

- Coat of arms

- Location within Poland
- Coordinates: 52°54′40″N 15°1′44″E
- Country: Poland
- Voivodeship: West Pomeranian
- County: Myślibórz
- Gmina: Nowogródek Pomorski
- Population (2006): 450
- Time zone: UTC+1 (CET)
  - Summer (DST): UTC+2 (CEST)
- Postal Code: 74-304
- Area code: +48 95
- Vehicle registration: ZMY
- Website: www.nowogrodekpomorski.pl

Nowogródek Pomorski [nɔvɔˈɡrudɛk pɔˈmɔrski] is a village in Myślibórz County, West Pomeranian Voivodeship, in north-western Poland. It is the seat of the gmina (administrative district) called Gmina Nowogródek Pomorski. It lies approximately 12 km (7 mi) east of Myślibórz and 64 km (40 mi) south-east of the regional capital Szczecin.

The village has a population of 450.

When part of the Greater Poland province of the fragmented Polish realm, Duke Władysław Odonic granted the area to the Knights Templar in 1232. An Early Gothic church was built in the village in the 13th century. Once a town, it received town rights in 1317 and was deprived of them before 1500. The village was heavily destroyed during the Thirty Years' War.

The main landmark of Nowogródek Pomorski is the Gothic church of Our Lady Queen of Poland, which dates back to the 13th century.
