= West Pomeranian Voivodeship =

Voivodeship of Poland

West Pomeranian Voivodeship Województwo zachodniopomorskie
- Voivodeship
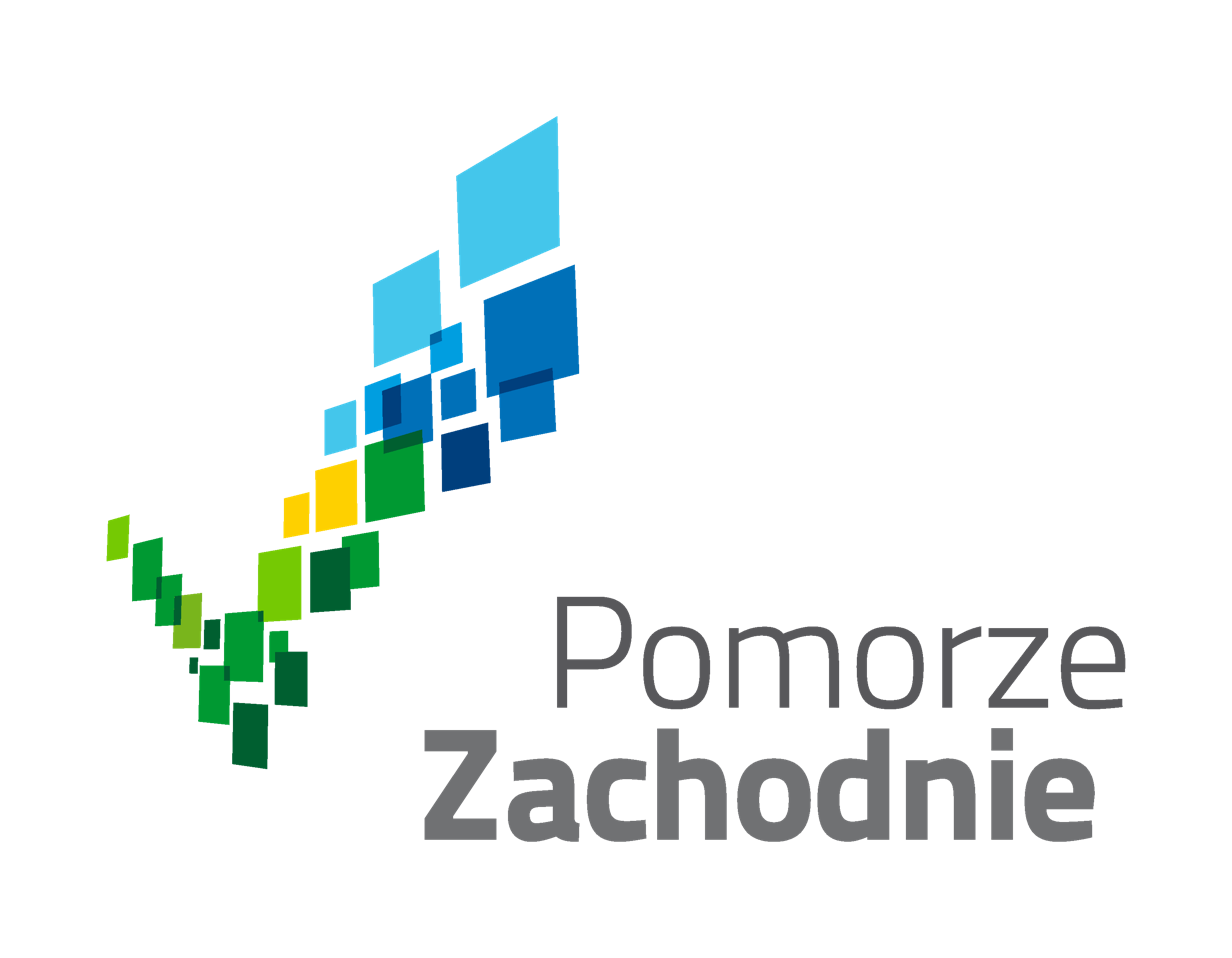
- Flag Coat of arms Brandmark

- Location within Poland.

- Division into counties.
- Coordinates (Szczecin): 53°25′N 14°35′E
- Country: Poland
- Capital: Szczecin
- Counties: 3 city counties 18 land counties: Koszalin; Świnoujście; Szczecin; Białogard County; Choszczno County; Drawsko County; Goleniów County; Gryfice County; Gryfino County; Kamień County; Kołobrzeg County; Koszalin County; Łobez County; Myślibórz County; Police County; Pyrzyce County; Sławno County; Stargard County; Świdwin County; Szczecinek County; Wałcz County

Government
  - Body: West Pomeranian Voivodeship executive board
  - Voivode: Adam Rudawski (PL2050)
  - Marshal: Olgierd Geblewicz (PO)
  - EP: Lubusz and West Pomeranian

Area
  - Total: 22,892.48 km^{2} (8,838.84 sq mi)

Population (2021)
  - Total: 1,682,003
  - Density: 73.47404/km^{2} (190.2969/sq mi)

GDP
  - Total: €30.031 billion (2024)
  - Per capita: €19,116 (2024)
- Time zone: UTC+1 (CET)
  - Summer (DST): UTC+2 (CEST)
- ISO 3166 code: PL-32
- Vehicle registration: Z
- HDI (2019): 0.869 very high · 11th
- Primary airport: Solidarity Szczecin–Goleniów Airport
- Website: szczecin.uw.gov.pl

West Pomeranian Voivodeship (Note: Polish: województwo zachodniopomorskie, pronounced [vɔjɛˈvut͡stfɔ zaˌxɔdɲɔpɔˈmɔrskʲɛ].) is a voivodeship (province) in northwestern Poland. Its capital and largest city is Szczecin. Its area equals 22,892.48 km^{2} (8,838.84 sq mi), and in 2021, it was inhabited by 1,682,003 people.

It was established on 1 January 1999, out of the former Szczecin and Koszalin Voivodeships and parts of Gorzów, Piła and Słupsk Voivodeships, pursuant to the Polish local government reforms adopted in 1998. It borders on Pomeranian Voivodeship to the east, Greater Poland Voivodeship to the southeast, Lubusz Voivodeship to the south, the German federal-states of Mecklenburg-West Pomerania and Brandenburg to the west, and the Baltic Sea to the north.

== Geography and tourism ==
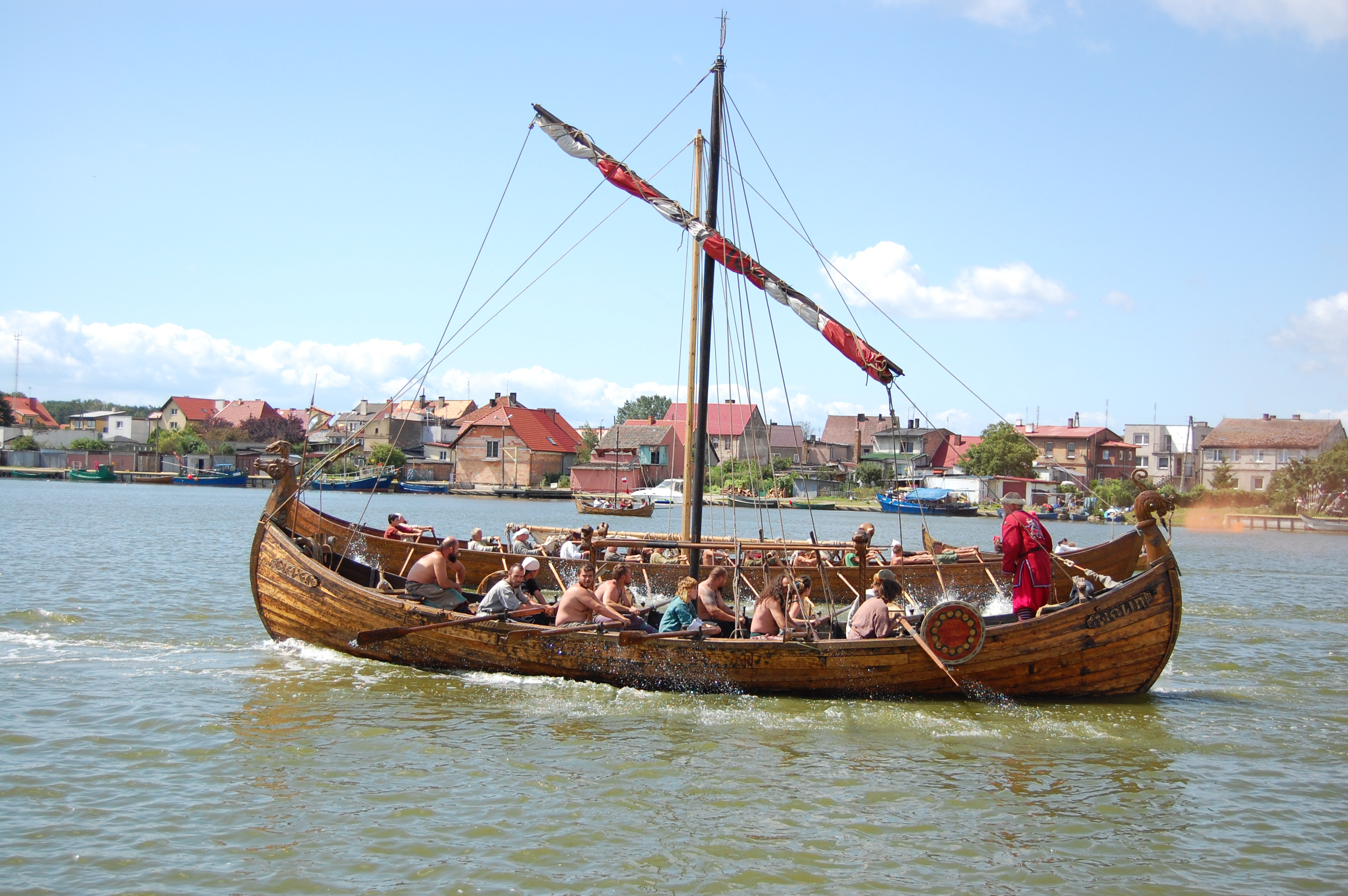
Viking Festival in Wolin

West Pomeranian Voivodeship is the fifth largest voivodeship of Poland in terms of area. The largest cities in the region are the capital Szczecin, as well as Koszalin, Stargard, Kołobrzeg and Świnoujście.

This is a picturesque region of the Baltic Sea coast, with many beaches, lakes and woodlands. Szczecin, Świnoujście and Police are important ports. Other major seaside towns include Międzyzdroje, Dziwnów, Kołobrzeg, and Mielno.

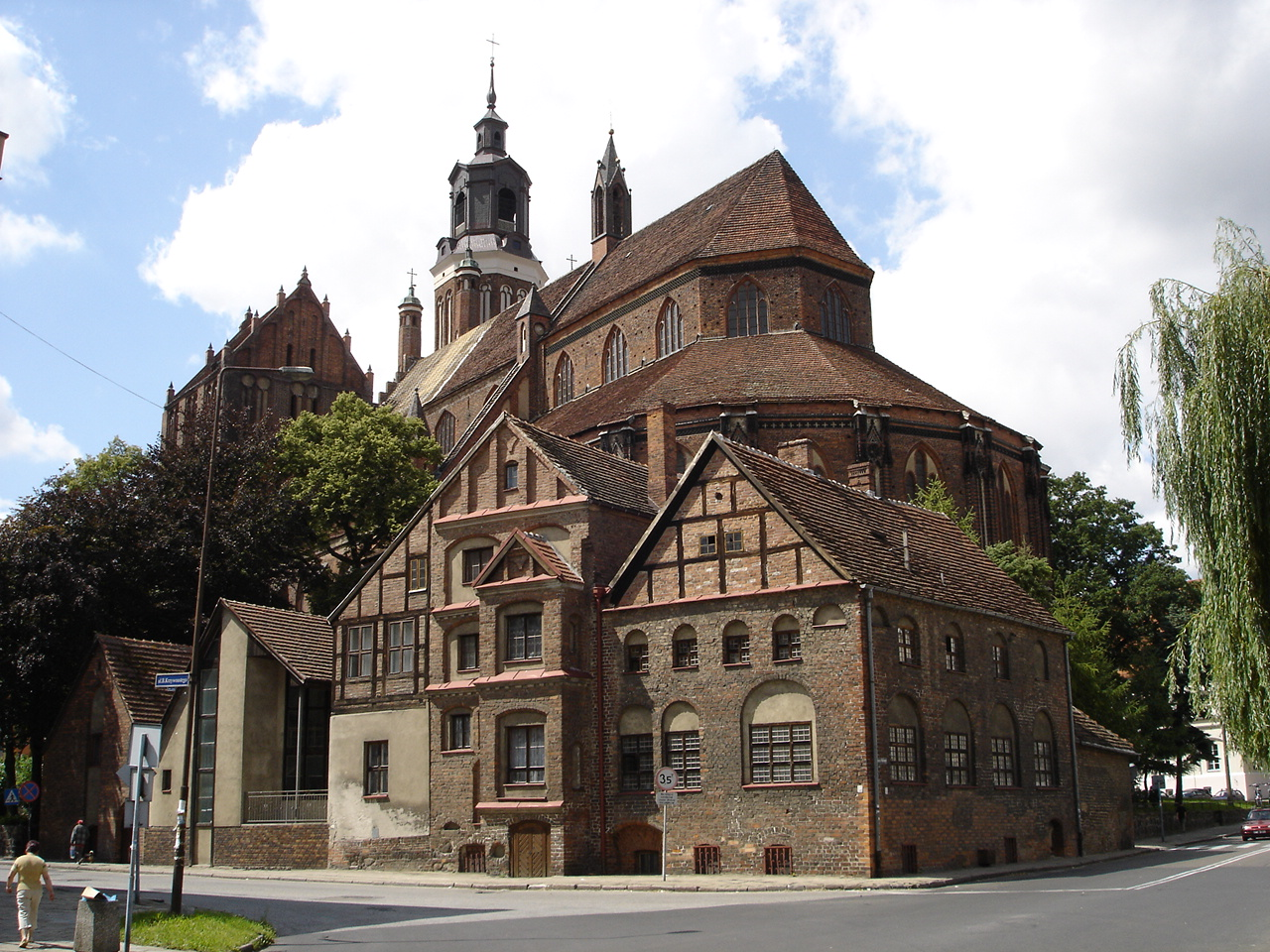
Church of the Virgin Mary, Queen of the World, in Stargard

West Pomerania is also rich in various forms and styles of architecture that were built during the Middle Ages as well as the Gothic, Renaissance, and Baroque periods. Darłowo, the birthplace of Eric of Pomerania, King of Denmark, Norway and Sweden, contains a preserved old town with the Gothic Our Lady of Częstochowa church, which holds the king's sarcophagus. The St. Mary's Church in Stargard and Saint John Co-Cathedral in Kamień Pomorski are considered two of the most precious Gothic churches of entire Poland, and as such are listed as Historic Monuments of Poland, whereas the Saint Stanislaus Kostka church in Chwarszczany is a nationally unique former Knights Templar church. In Cedynia, the westernmost town of Poland, there is a memorial commemorating the Battle of Cedynia of 972, the oldest recorded battle in the history of Poland. The Świnoujście Lighthouse is the tallest brick lighthouse in the world. The War Cemetery in Stargard is the burial place of over 5,000 Allied soldiers and prisoners of war from both world wars, including Polish, French, Serbian/Yugoslav, Russian/Soviet, Italian, Romanian, Belgian, British, Moroccan, Portuguese and Dutch. There are also numerous World War II memorials, including memorials to Allied POWs from World War II at the former Oflag II-B, Oflag II-D and Stalag Luft IV German POW camps in Choszczno, Kłomino and Tychowo, and a memorial to British pilots of the No. 617 Squadron RAF shot down by Germany in Karsibór, Świnoujście.

There is a diverse repertoire of theaters, festivals, museums and galleries. During a few-day long annual Sea Festival in Szczecin, a number of free open-air concerts take place. In Świnoujście during the summer, the FAMA Academic Youth Arts Festival takes place – an event with several years of tradition, which attracts not only young people but also older alumni. In Międzyzdroje, there is a Festival Of The Stars, which draws many popular actors. In Wolin, a Viking Festival takes place, which draws "Vikings" from all across Europe.

Another draw to the area is a wide array of health resorts. Brine and peloid, discovered in the 19th century, together with geothermal water resources, are popular attractions in Świnoujście, Kamień Pomorski and Połczyn Zdrój.

A notable phenomenon on a worldly scale is the Crooked Forest outside the town of Gryfino.

== Cities and towns ==
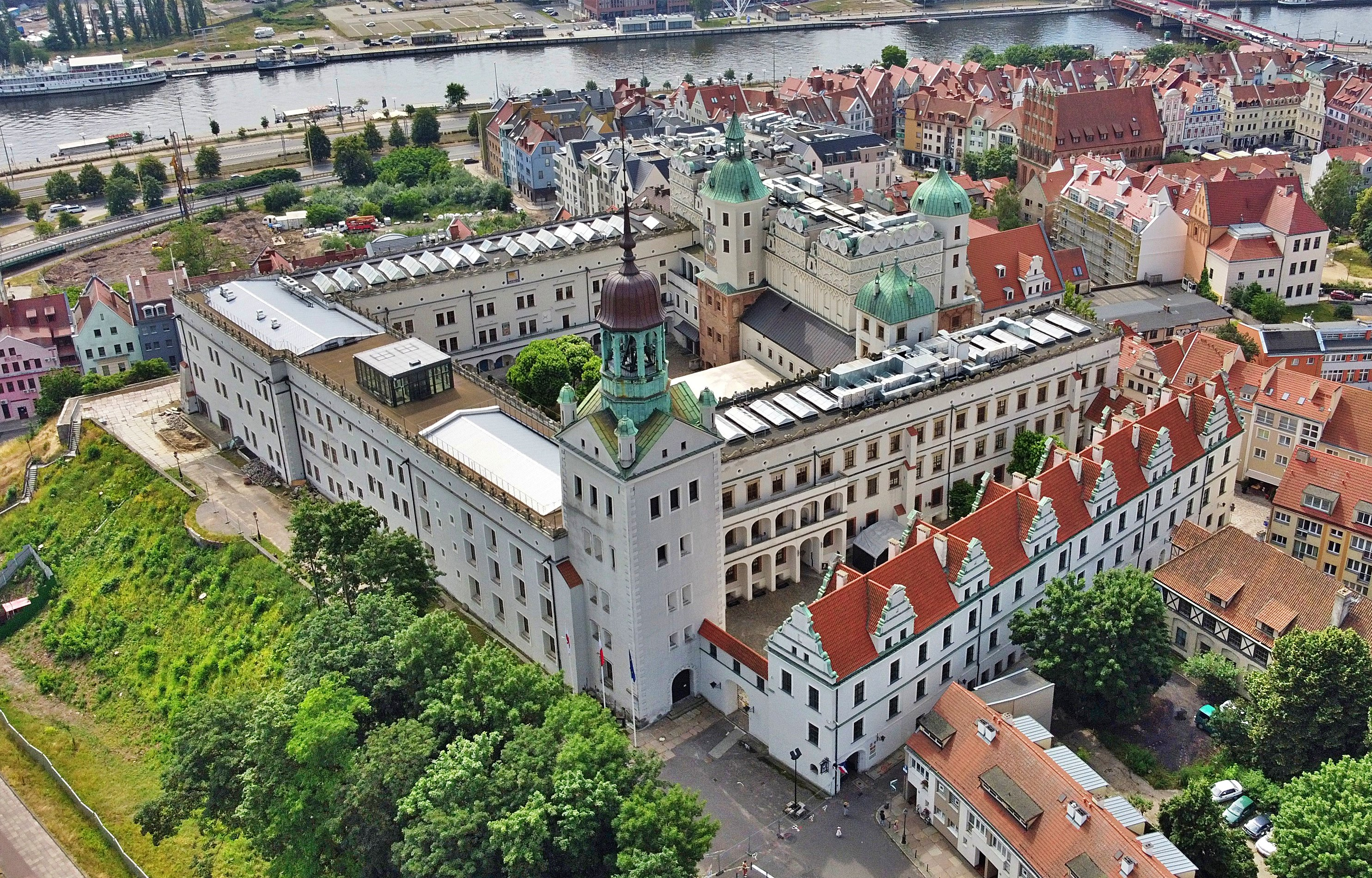
Ducal Castle, Szczecin

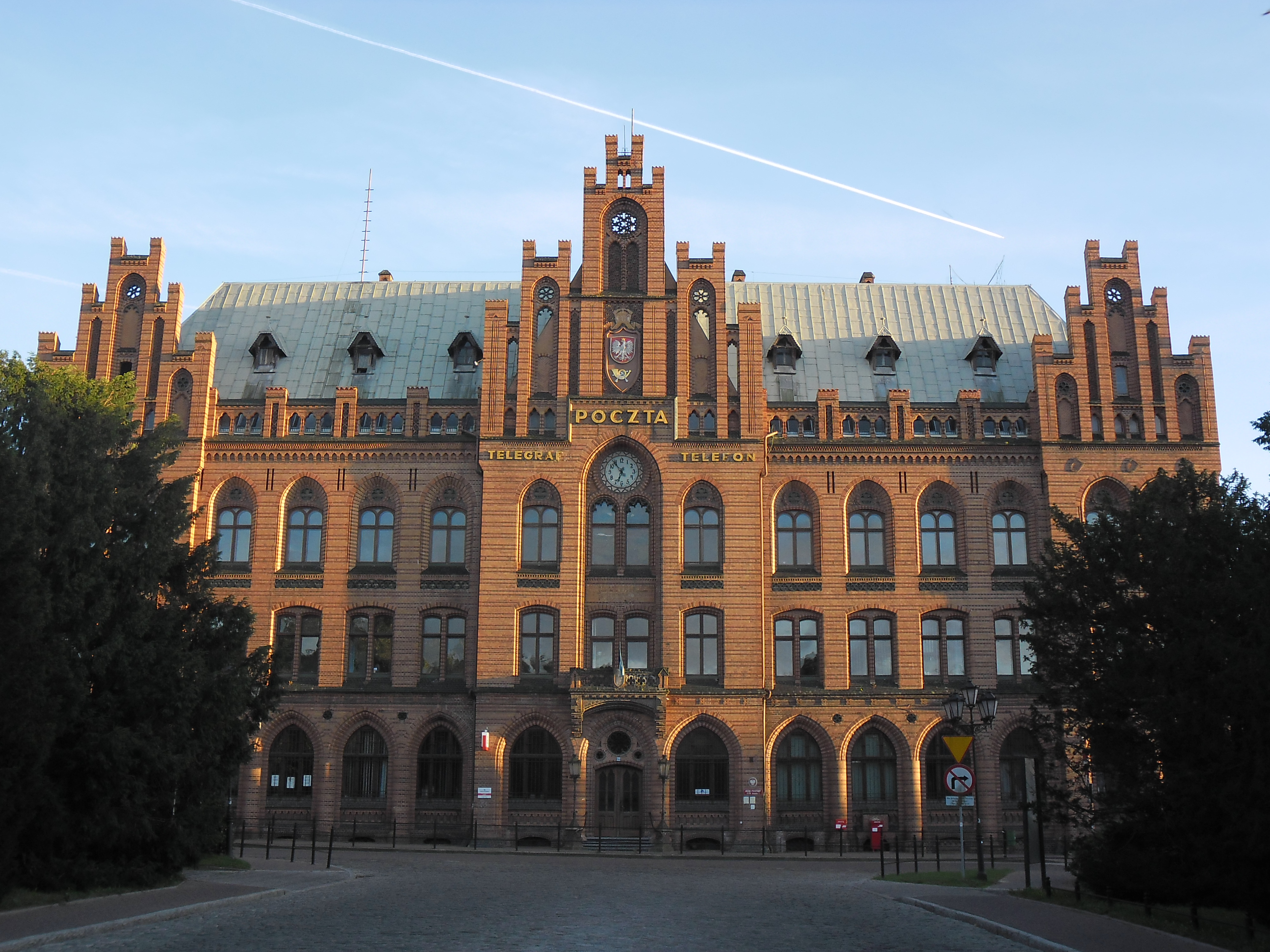
Main post office, Koszalin

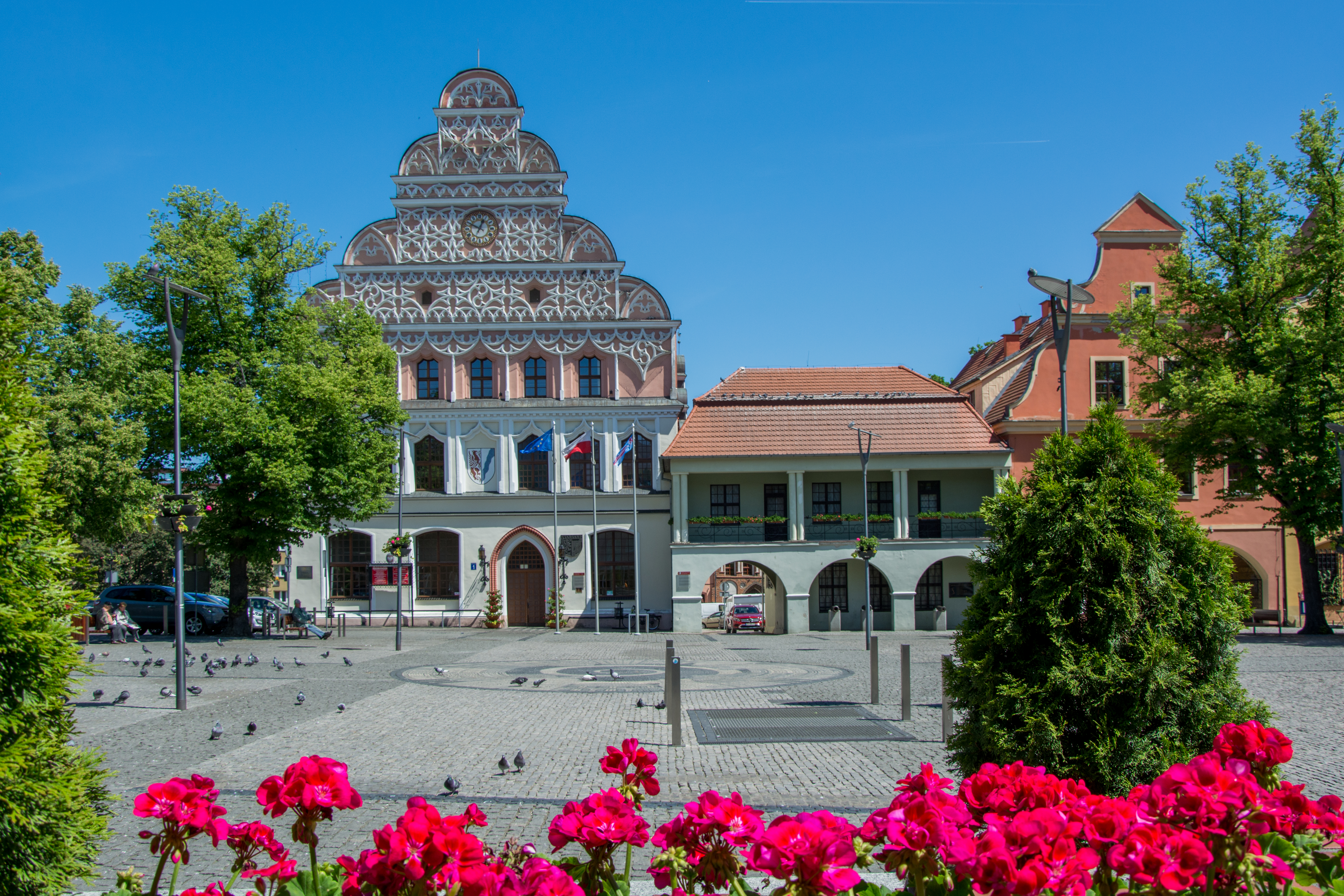
Market Square and City Hall, Stargard

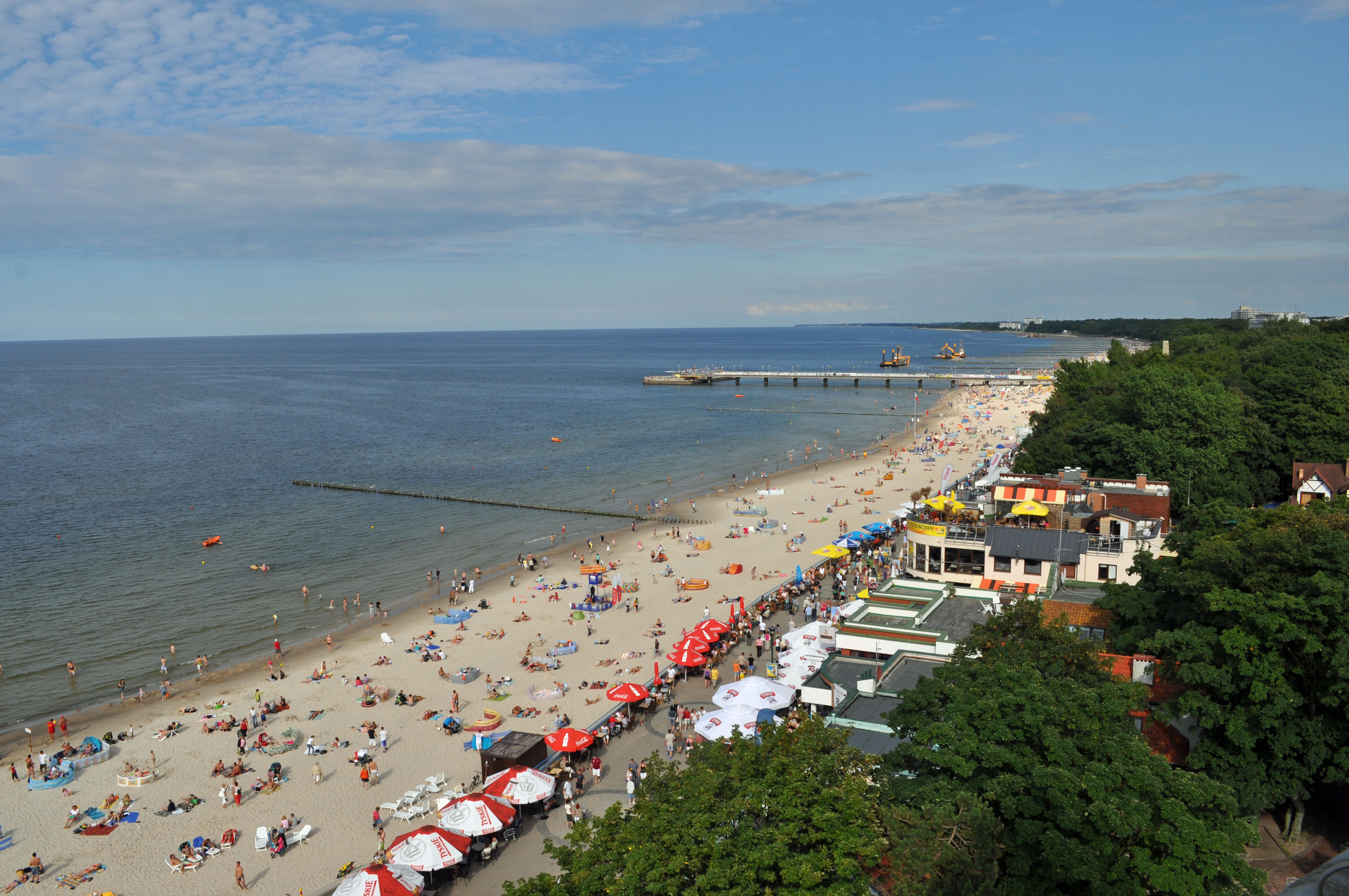
Beach, Kołobrzeg

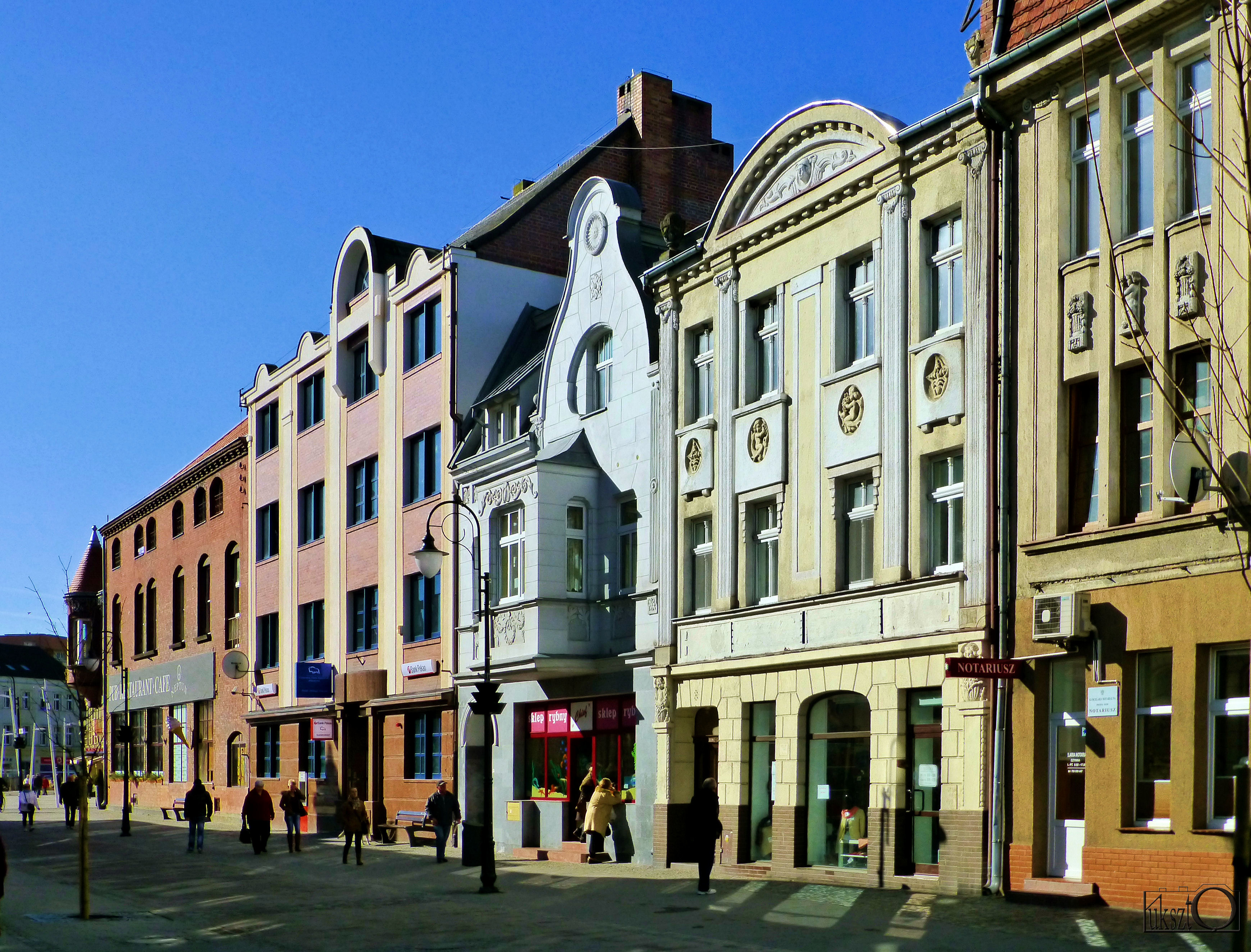
Historic townhouses, Świnoujście

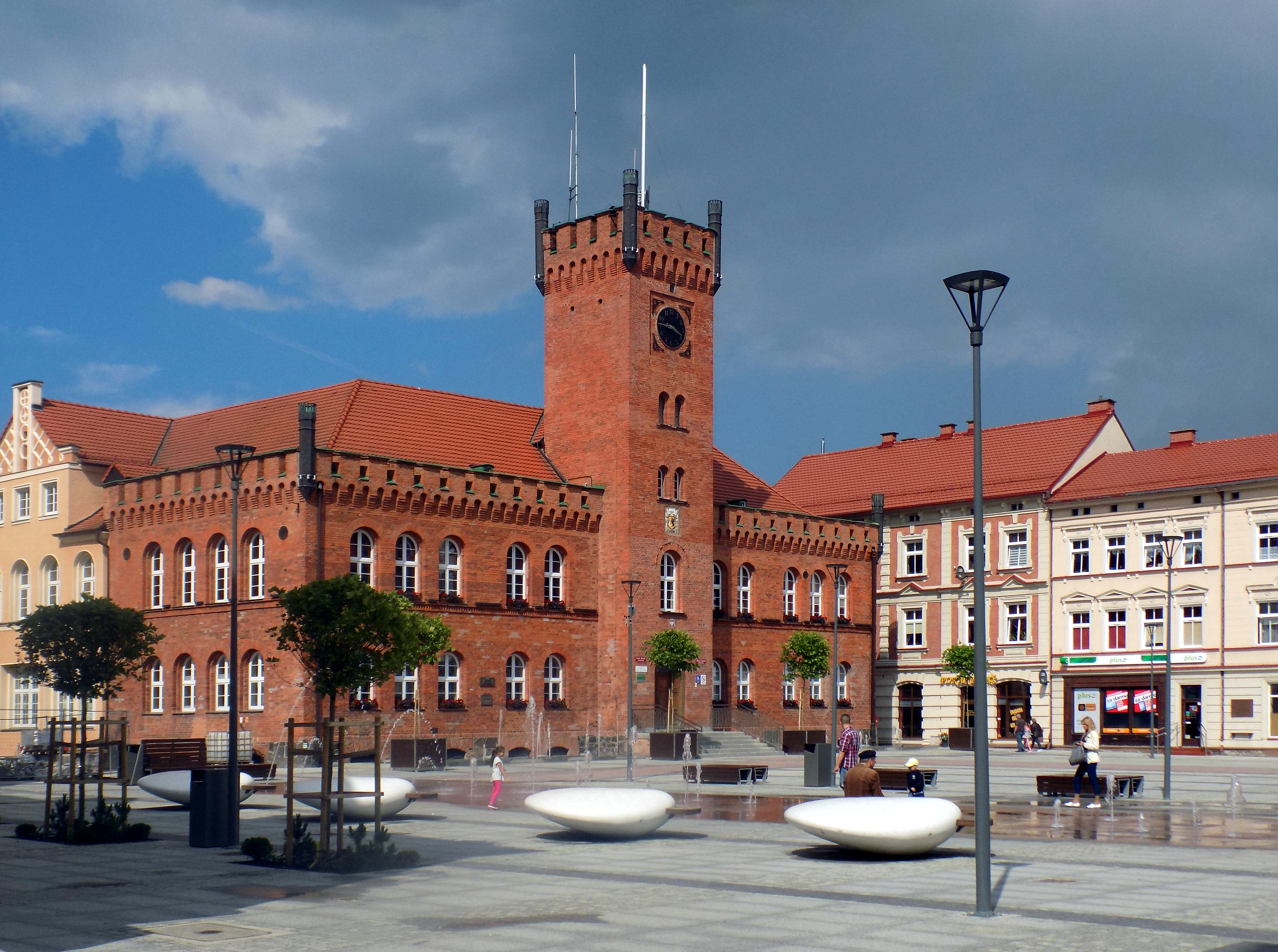
Town Hall, Szczecinek

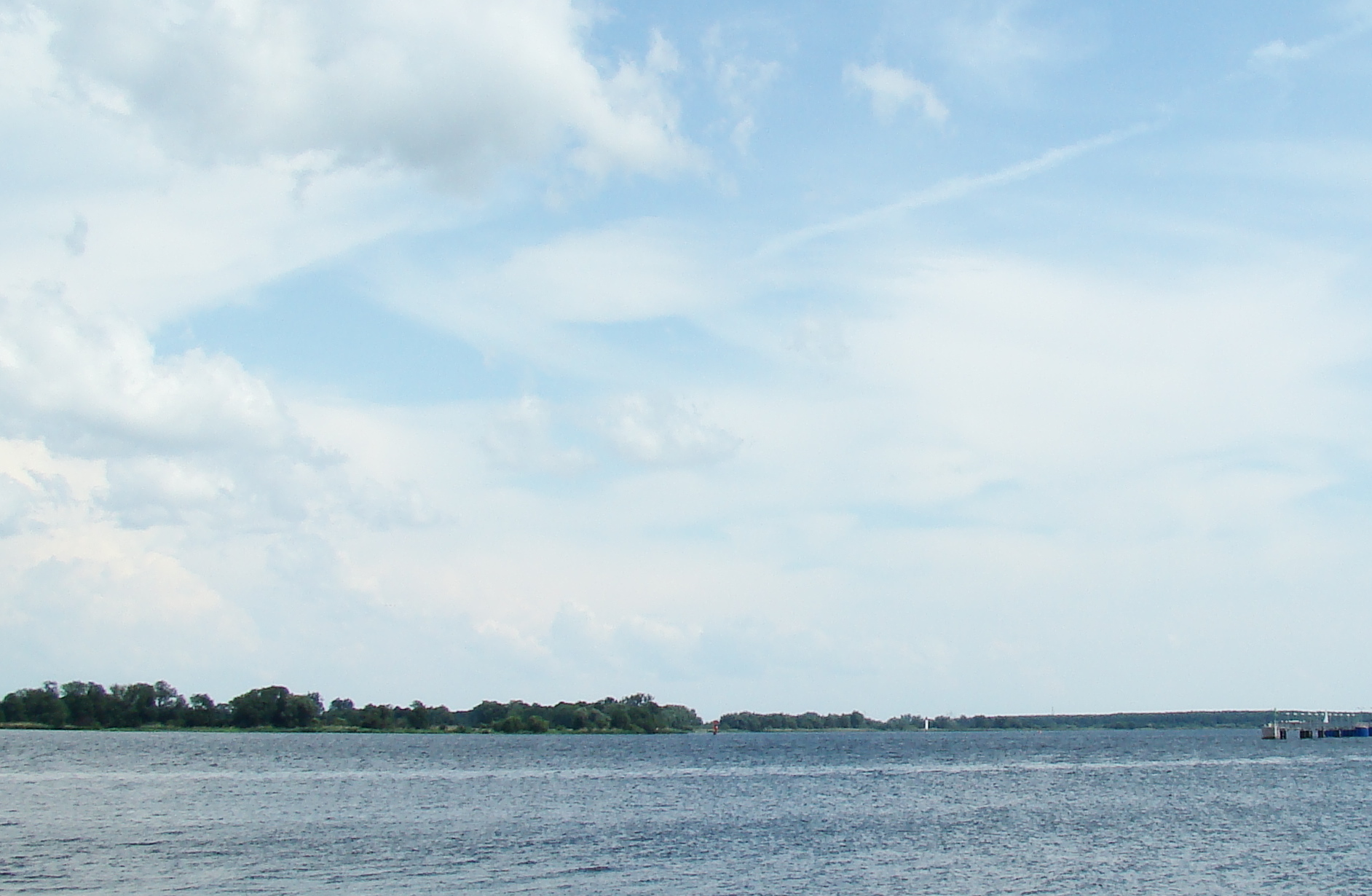
Oder River in Police

The voivodeship contains five cities and 61 towns. These are listed below in descending order of population (according to official figures for 2019):

Cities (governed by a city mayor or prezydent miasta):
1. Szczecin (402,067)
2. Koszalin (107,225)
3. Stargard (67,795)
4. Kołobrzeg (46,309)
5. Świnoujście (40,883)

Towns:

1. Szczecinek (40,016)
2. Police (32,575)
3. Wałcz (25,312)
4. Białogard (24,250)
5. Goleniów (22,284)
6. Gryfino (21,221)
7. Nowogard (16,603)
8. Gryfice (16,524)
9. Świdwin (15,533)
10. Choszczno (15,213)
11. Dębno (13,775)
12. Barlinek (13,752)
13. Darłowo (13,710)
14. Złocieniec (12,901)
15. Pyrzyce (12,581)
16. Sławno (12,511)
17. Drawsko Pomorskie (11,597)
18. Myślibórz (11,151)
19. Łobez (10,167)
20. Trzebiatów (9,986)
21. Kamień Pomorski (8,807)
22. Połczyn-Zdrój (8,073)
23. Chojna (7,375)
24. Czaplinek (7,109)
25. Sianów (6,621)
26. Karlino (5,945)
27. Międzyzdroje (5,376)
28. Borne Sulinowo (5,116)
29. Wolin (4,878)
30. Kalisz Pomorski (4,366)
31. Resko (4,217)
32. Bobolice (3,991)
33. Płoty (3,965)
34. Lipiany (3,922)
35. Barwice (3,715)
36. Mieszkowice (3,647)
37. Maszewo (3,357)
38. Chociwel (3,177)
39. Mirosławiec (3,081)
40. Mielno (2,956)
41. Polanów (2,917)
42. Recz (2,898)
43. Węgorzyno (2,816)
44. Dziwnów (2,663)
45. Golczewo (2,660)
46. Pełczyce (2,583)
47. Tychowo (2,520)
48. Stepnica (2,465)
49. Gościno (2,430)
50. Człopa (2,322)
51. Dobra (2,307)
52. Drawno (2,280)
53. Dobrzany (2,267)
54. Trzcińsko-Zdrój (2,263)
55. Biały Bór (2,185)
56. Tuczno (1,934)
57. Ińsko (1,924)
58. Moryń (1,630)
59. Cedynia (1,555)
60. Suchań (1,471)
61. Nowe Warpno (1,190)

The Polish districts of the historical region Western Pomerania (the three westernmost districts of the West Pomeranian Voivodeship) had a population of about 520,000 in 2012 (cities of Szczecin, Świnoujście and Police County combined) – while the German districts had a population of about 470,000 in 2012 (Vorpommern-Rügen and Vorpommern-Greifswald combined). Overall, about 1 million people live in the historical region of Western Pomerania today, while the Szczecin agglomeration reaches even further.

== Administrative divisions ==
West Pomeranian Voivodeship is divided into 21 counties (powiats): three city counties and 18 land counties. These are further divided into 114 gminas.

The counties are listed in the following table (ordering within categories is by decreasing population in 2019):

English and Polish names	Area (km^{2})	Population (2019)	Seat	Other towns	Total gminas
City counties
Szczecin	301	402,067			1
Koszalin	84	107,225			1
Świnoujście	197	40,883			1
Land counties
Stargard County powiat stargardzki	1,520	120,088	Stargard	Chociwel, Dobrzany, Ińsko, Suchań	10
Gryfino County powiat gryfiński	1,870	82,258	Gryfino	Chojna, Mieszkowice, Trzcińsko-Zdrój, Cedynia, Moryń	9
Goleniów County powiat goleniowski	1,617	82,418	Goleniów	Nowogard, Maszewo, Stepnica	6
Szczecinek County powiat szczecinecki	1,765	77,731	Szczecinek	Borne Sulinowo, Barwice, Biały Bór	6
Kołobrzeg County powiat kołobrzeski	726	79,470	Kołobrzeg	Gościno	7
Police County powiat policki	664	79,967	Police	Nowe Warpno	4
Myślibórz County powiat myśliborski	1,182	65,999	Myślibórz	Barlinek, Dębno	5
Koszalin County powiat koszaliński	1,669	66,373	Koszalin *	Sianów, Bobolice, Polanów, Mielno	8
Gryfice County powiat gryficki	1,018	60,474	Gryfice	Trzebiatów, Płoty	6
Drawsko County powiat drawski	1,764	57,171	Drawsko Pomorskie	Złocieniec, Czaplinek, Kalisz Pomorski	6
Sławno County powiat sławieński	1,044	56,231	Sławno	Darłowo	6
Wałcz County powiat wałecki	1,415	53,325	Wałcz	Mirosławiec, Człopa, Tuczno	5
Choszczno County powiat choszczeński	1,328	48,419	Choszczno	Recz, Pełczyce, Drawno	6
Białogard County powiat białogardzki	845	47,697	Białogard	Karlino, Tychowo	4
Świdwin County powiat świdwiński	1,093	46,997	Świdwin	Połczyn-Zdrój	6
Kamień County powiat kamieński	1,007	47,115	Kamień Pomorski	Międzyzdroje, Wolin, Dziwnów, Golczewo	6
Pyrzyce County powiat pyrzycki	726	39,482	Pyrzyce	Lipiany	6
Łobez County powiat łobeski	1,066	36,954	Łobez	Resko, Węgorzyno, Dobra	5
NOTE: * seat not part of the county

== Protected areas ==
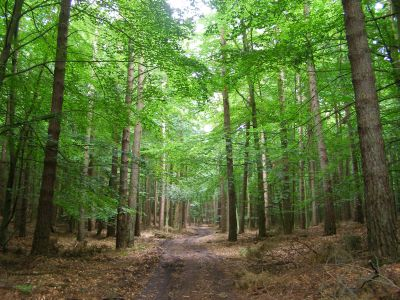
Wolin National Park

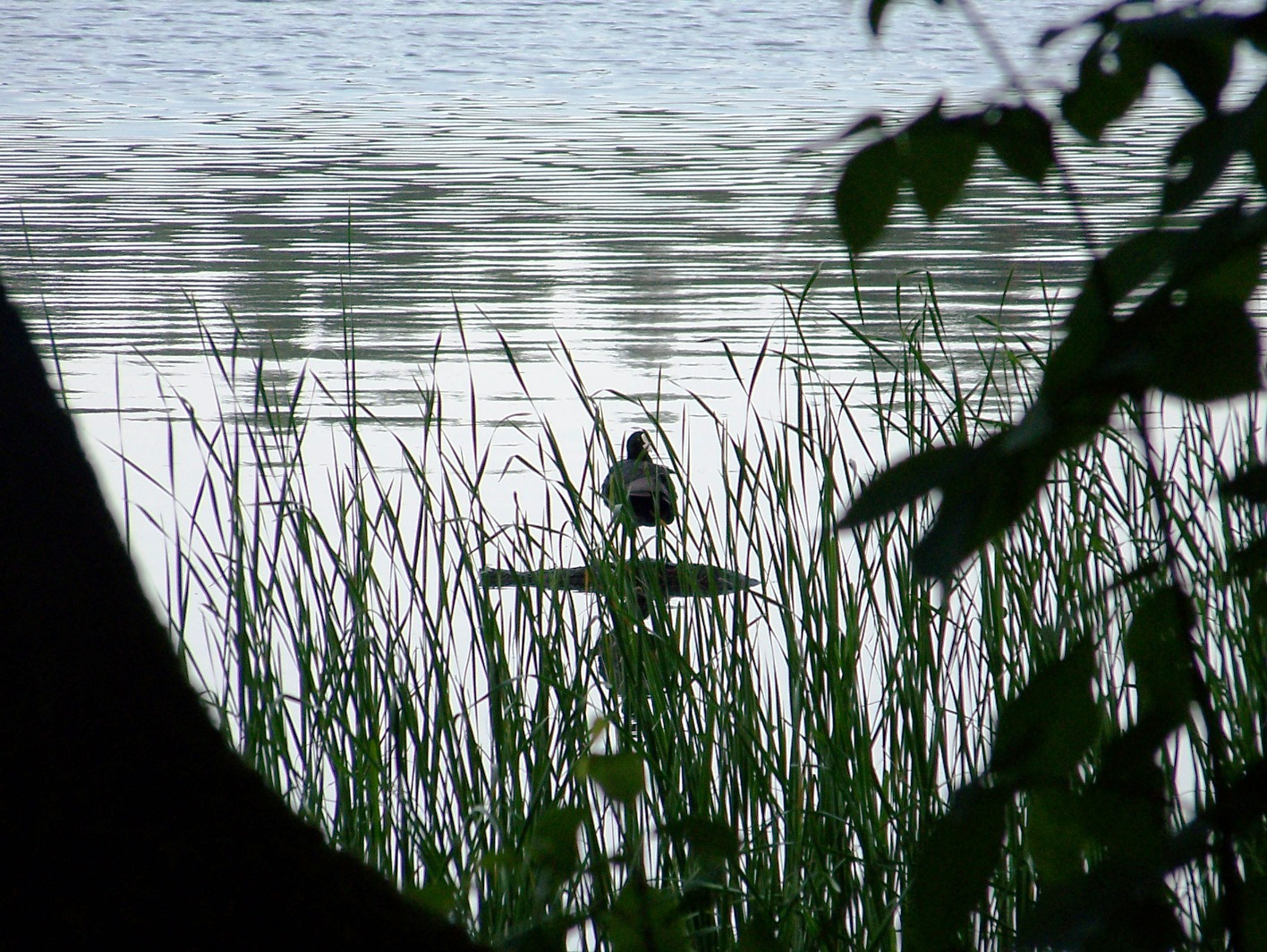
Drawa National Park

Protected areas in West Pomeranian Voivodeship include two National Parks and seven Landscape Parks. These are listed below.

- Drawno National Park (partly in Lubusz and Greater Poland Voivodeships)
- Wolin National Park
- Barlinek-Gorzów Landscape Park (partly in Lubusz Voivodeship)
- Cedynia Landscape Park
- Drawsko Landscape Park
- Ińsko Landscape Park
- Lower Odra Valley Landscape Park
- Szczecin Landscape Park
- Ujście Warty Landscape Park (partly in Lubusz Voivodeship)

== Cuisine ==
Apart from nationwide Polish cuisine, the region has its local traditional foods and beverages. The voivodeship is notable for production of honey, with several varieties listed as traditional foods by the Ministry of Agriculture and Rural Development of Poland.

As a coastal province, there are several local fish dishes, including the Szczecin-style and Kołobrzeg-style herring. Szczecinek krówki, Szczecin gingerbread and Choszczno strucla (type of poppy seed roll) are local delicacies.

Traditional beverages include mead, produced in Cedynia and Wolin, beer from Lipiany and Szczecin and nalewka from Dębina.

== Demographics ==
Historical population
Year	Pop.	±%
1988	1,662,563	—
2002	1,698,214	+2.1%
2011	1,722,885	+1.5%
2021	1,657,716	−3.8%

After Germany's defeat in World War II, the region again became part of Poland under the Potsdam Agreement, which created territorial changes demanded by the Soviet Union. German settlement in Pomerania dates back to the 12th century. In 1945 with the defeat of Nazi Germany, all German-speaking communities located east of the Oder-Neisse Line were expelled, abruptly changing the demographic makeup of much of the region.

In 1948, 67 percent of the populace originated from central Poland, Greater Poland and Pomerelia while 25 percent came from the Polish areas annexed by the Soviet Union. Another 6 percent returned to Poland from Western Europe. About 50,000 Ukrainians were forcibly resettled to West Pomerania in the Operation Vistula in 1947.

In the 16th and 17th centuries, some Scots settled in several towns of the current West Pomeranian Voivodeship, i.e. Wałcz, Biały Bór, Człopa and Gryfice, whereas in the 17th and 18th centuries French Huguenots settled in Stargard, Kołobrzeg, Szczecin and Gryfino.

== Education and science ==
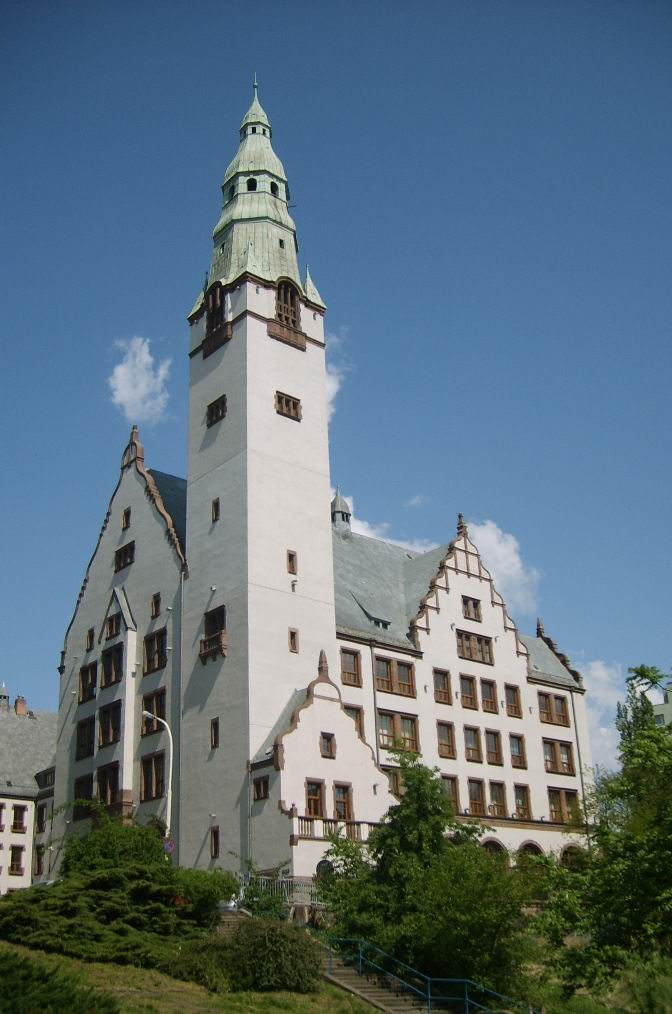
Pomeranian Medical University in Szczecin

- University of Szczecin (Polish Uniwersytet Szczeciński) with 35,000 students
- Technical University in Koszalin with 14,000 students (Politechnika Koszalińska)
- West Pomeranian University of Technology in Szczecin with 15,300 students (Zachodniopomorski Uniwersytet Technologiczny), formed as a result of merger of Szczecin University of Technology (Politechnika Szczecińska) and University of Agriculture in Szczecin (Akademia Rolnicza w Szczecinie)
- Pomeranian Medical University with 4,000 students (Pomorski Uniwersytet Medyczny)
- The Szczecin Academy of Arts (Akademia Sztuki w Szczecinie)
- Maritime University of Szczecin (Akademia Morska w Szczecinie)
- The West Pomeranian Business School with 3,000 students (Zachodniopomorska Szkoła Biznesu)
- Szczeciński Park Naukowo-Technologiczny (science park in Szczecin)

== Economy ==
The Gross domestic product (GDP) of the province was 18.3 billion euros in 2018, accounting for 3.7% of Polish economic output. GDP per capita adjusted for purchasing power was 17,700 euros or 59% of the EU27 average in the same year. The GDP per employee was 67% of the EU average.

The Świnoujście LNG terminal, Poland's main liquefied natural gas import terminal, is located in the province.

== Industrial, science and technology parks ==
- Goleniowski Park Przemysłowy (industrial park in Goleniów)
- Infrapark Police (industrial park in Police, Poland)
- Stargardzki Park Przemysłowy (industrial park in Stargard)
- Szczeciński Park Naukowo-Technologiczny (science park in Szczecin)

== Transportation ==
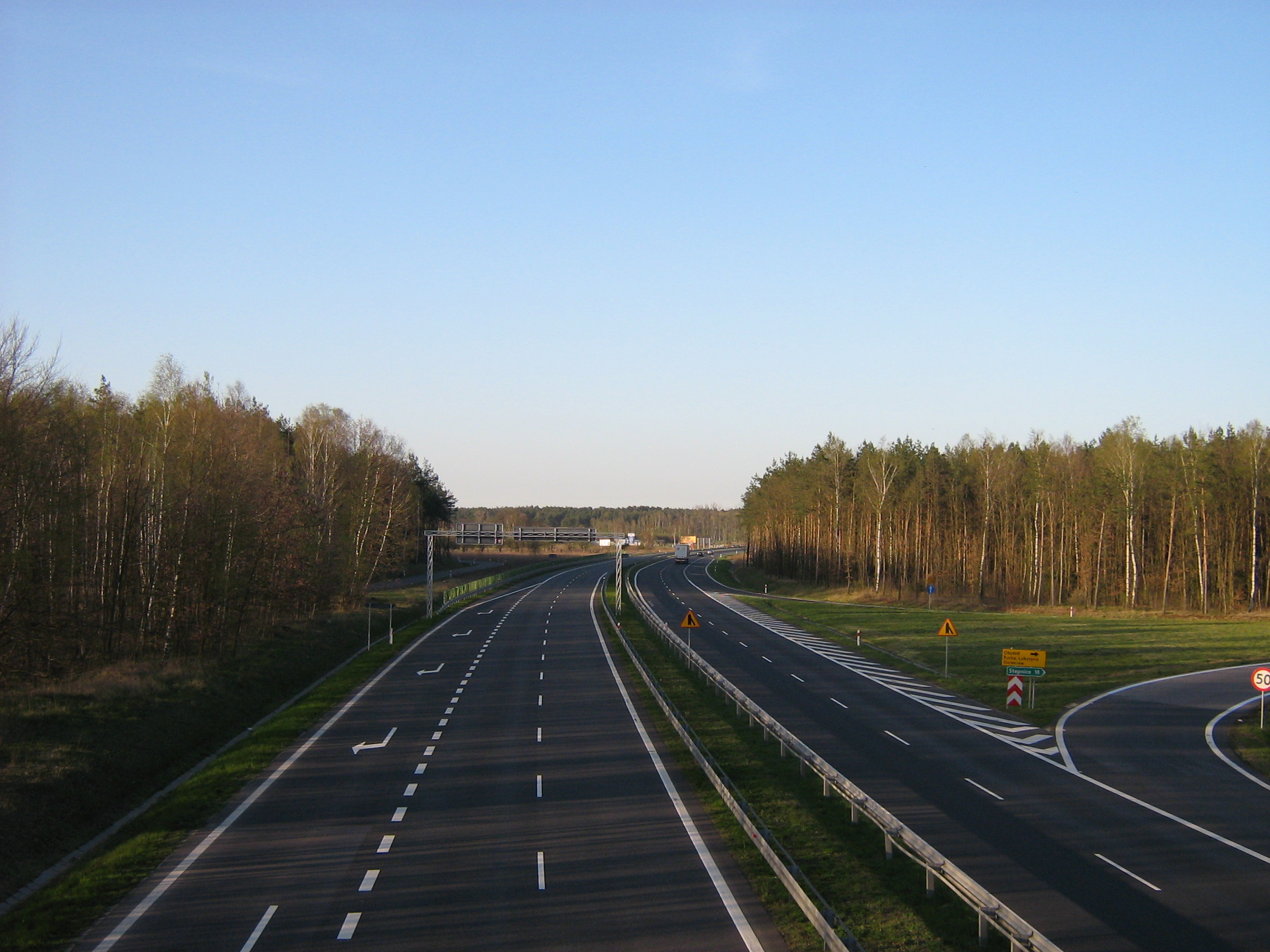
Expressway S3 near Goleniów

There are two main international road routes that pass through the voivodeship: National road 3 (Poland) Świnoujście-Szczecin-Gorzów Wielkopolski-Zielona Góra-Legnica-Czech border (part of European route E65 from Swedish Malmö to Chaniá in Greece) and National road 6 (Poland) Szczecin-Koszalin-Słupsk-Gdańsk (part of European route E28 from Berlin to Minsk). Most of the National road 3 in the voivodeship is in a standard of an expressway (Expressway S3 (Poland)). The National road 6 between German border and Rzęśnica is in the standard of autostrada (A6 autostrada (Poland)), whereas part between Rzęścnica and Goleniów and bypasses of Goleniów and Nowogard are in standards of an expressway (Expressway S6 (Poland)). Other important national roads are National road 10 (Poland) (German border-Szczecin-Piła-Bydgoscz-Toruń-Płońsk) and National road 11 (Poland) (Kołobrzeg-Koszalin-Piła-Poznań-Bytom). Apart from the above, some other national roads are located in the voivodeship. The voivodeship possesses also a well-developed network of regional roads.

Main railways in the province are line no. 351 Szczecin-Poznań, line no. 273 Szczecin-Wrocław (so-called "Odra railway"), line no. 202 Stargard-Gdańsk, line no. 401 Szczecin-Świnoujście and line no. 404 Kołobrzeg-Szczecinek. The main railway stations of the province are Szczecin main station, Stargard and Koszalin. The stations are served by fast PKP Intercity trains which connect them with the capital Warsaw, as well as other major Polish cities. In addition to these fast express services, inter-regional trains and intra-regional trains are operated by the firm Polregio. Szczecin main station possesses international train connections with Berlin, Schwerin and Lübeck (operated by DB Regio). Świnoujście has a direct train connection with Stralsund, which is operated by Usedomer Bäderbahn.

The only domestic and international airport in West Pomeranian Voivodeship is Szczecin-Goleniów "Solidarność" Airport. Also, part of the runway of an abandoned airport in Bagicz (near Kołobrzeg) was converted to an airport licensed to service planes carrying not more than 20 passengers on board.

== Sports ==
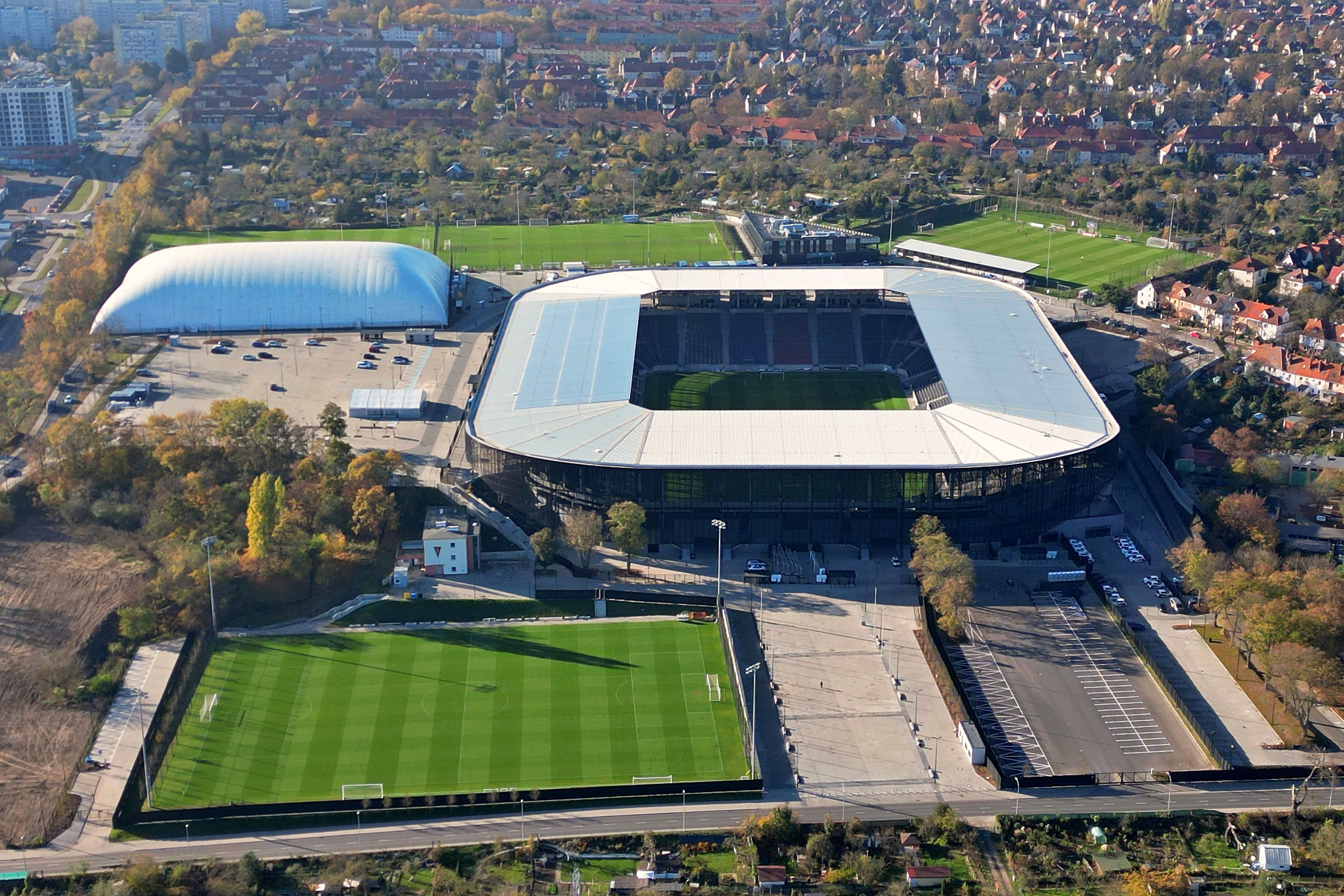
Florian Krygier Stadium, home venue of Pogoń Szczecin

Football and basketball enjoy the largest following in the voivodeship.

Professional sports teams
Club	Sport	League	Trophies
Wilki Morskie Szczecin	Basketball (men's)	Polish Basketball League	1 Polish Championship (2023)
Spójnia Stargard	Basketball (men's)	I Liga	0
SKK Kotwica Kołobrzeg	Basketball (men's)	I Liga	1 Polish Cup (2009)
KPS Chemik Police	Volleyball (women's)	Tauron Liga	11 Polish Championships; 10 Polish Cups
Pogoń Szczecin	Football (men's)	Ekstraklasa	0
Pogoń Szczecin	Football (women's)	Ekstraliga	1 Polish Championship (2024)
Świt Szczecin	Football (men's)	II liga	0
AZS Politechnika Koszalin	Handball (women's)	Superliga	1 Polish Cup (2008)
Pogoń Szczecin	Handball (women's)	Liga Centralna	3 Polish Championships (1983, 1986, 1991); 4 Polish Cups
Pogoń Szczecin	Handball (men's)	Liga Centralna	0

== Gallery ==
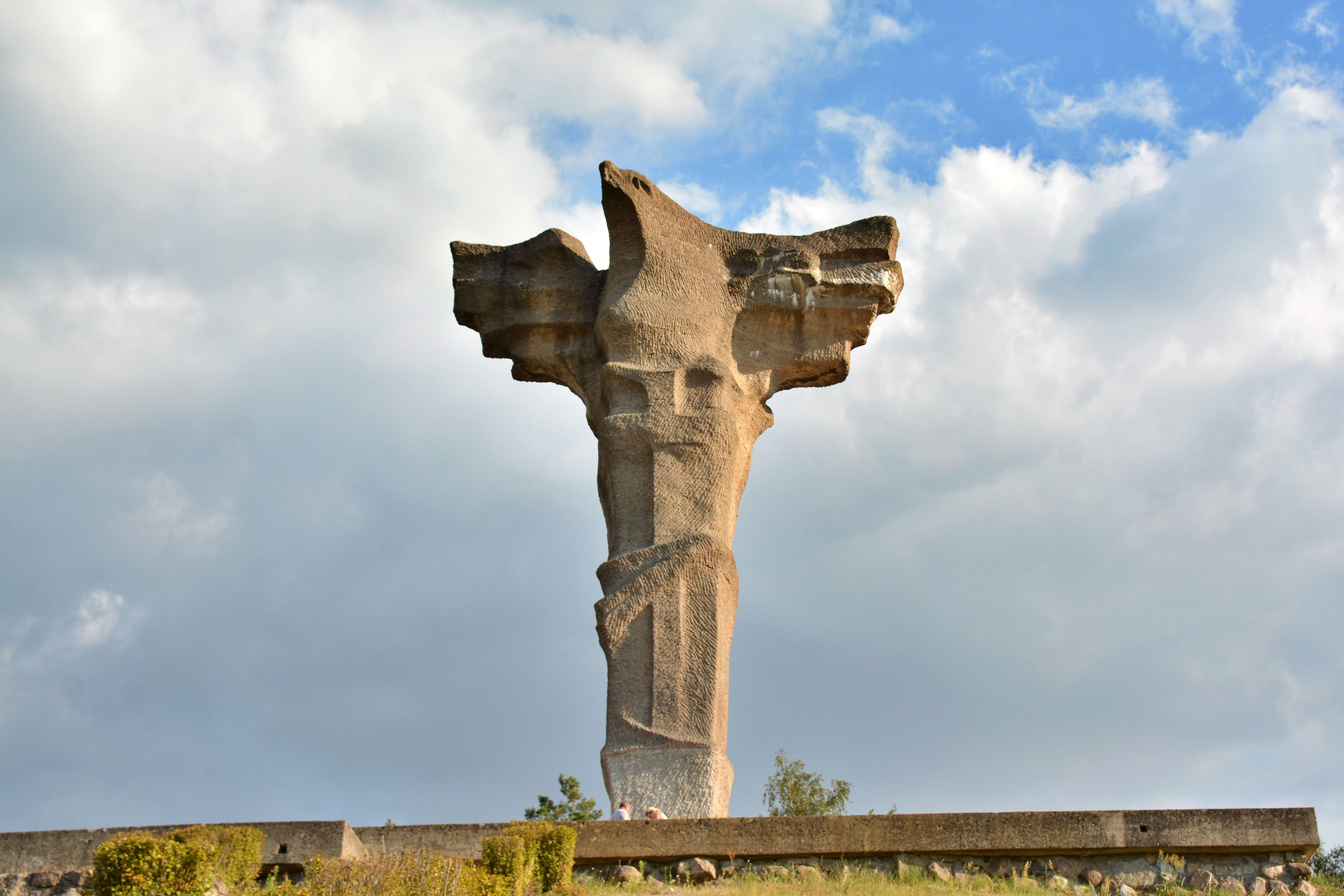
Battle of Cedynia Monument, Cedynia

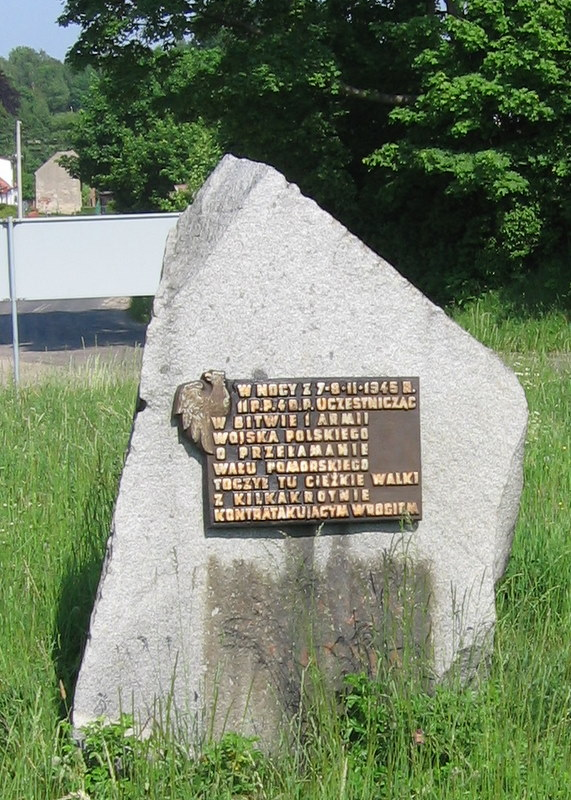
Plaque commemorating the battle of the Pomeranian Wall

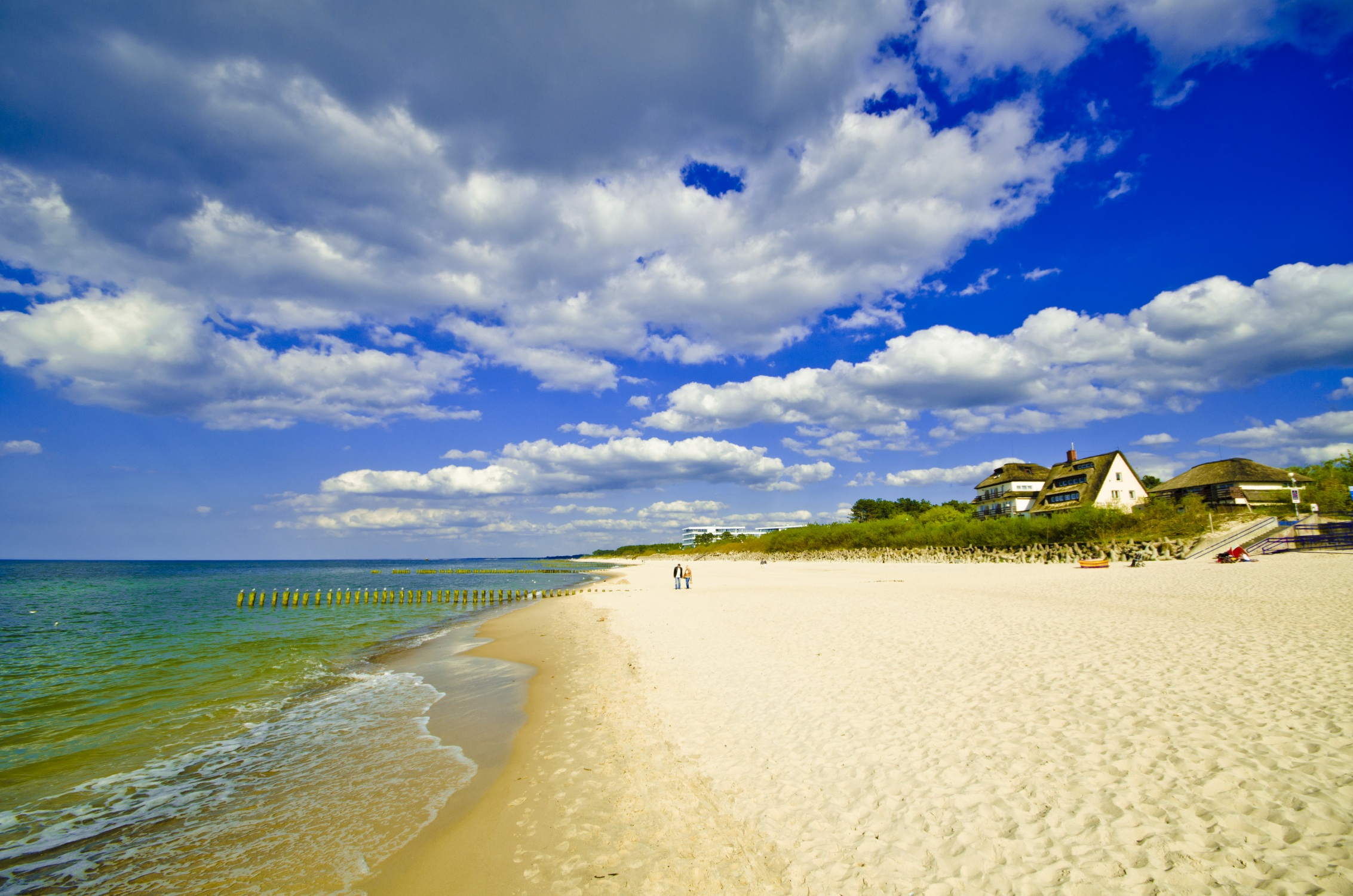
Beach in Mielno

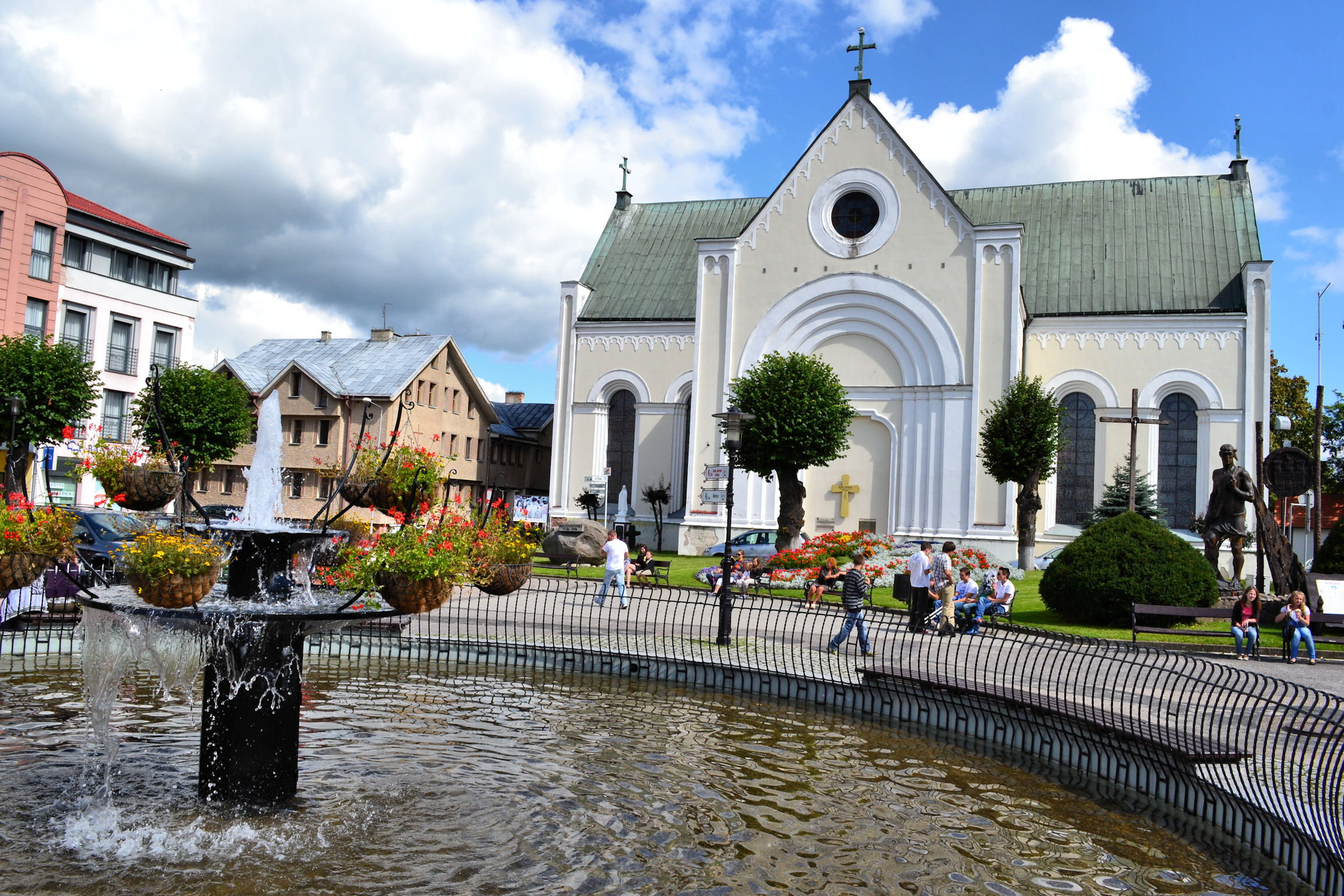
Czaplinek was once settled by Templars

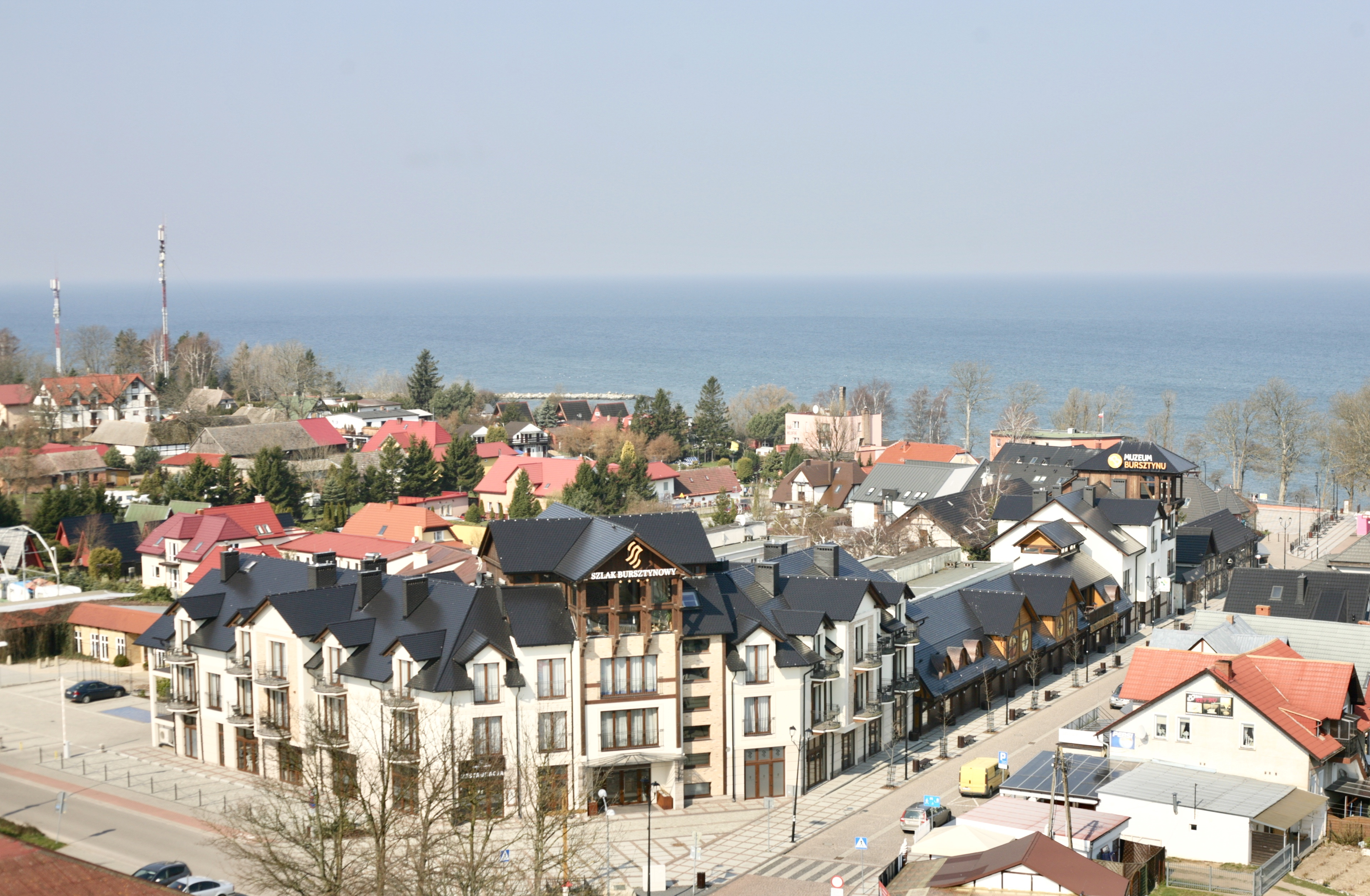
Jarosławiec

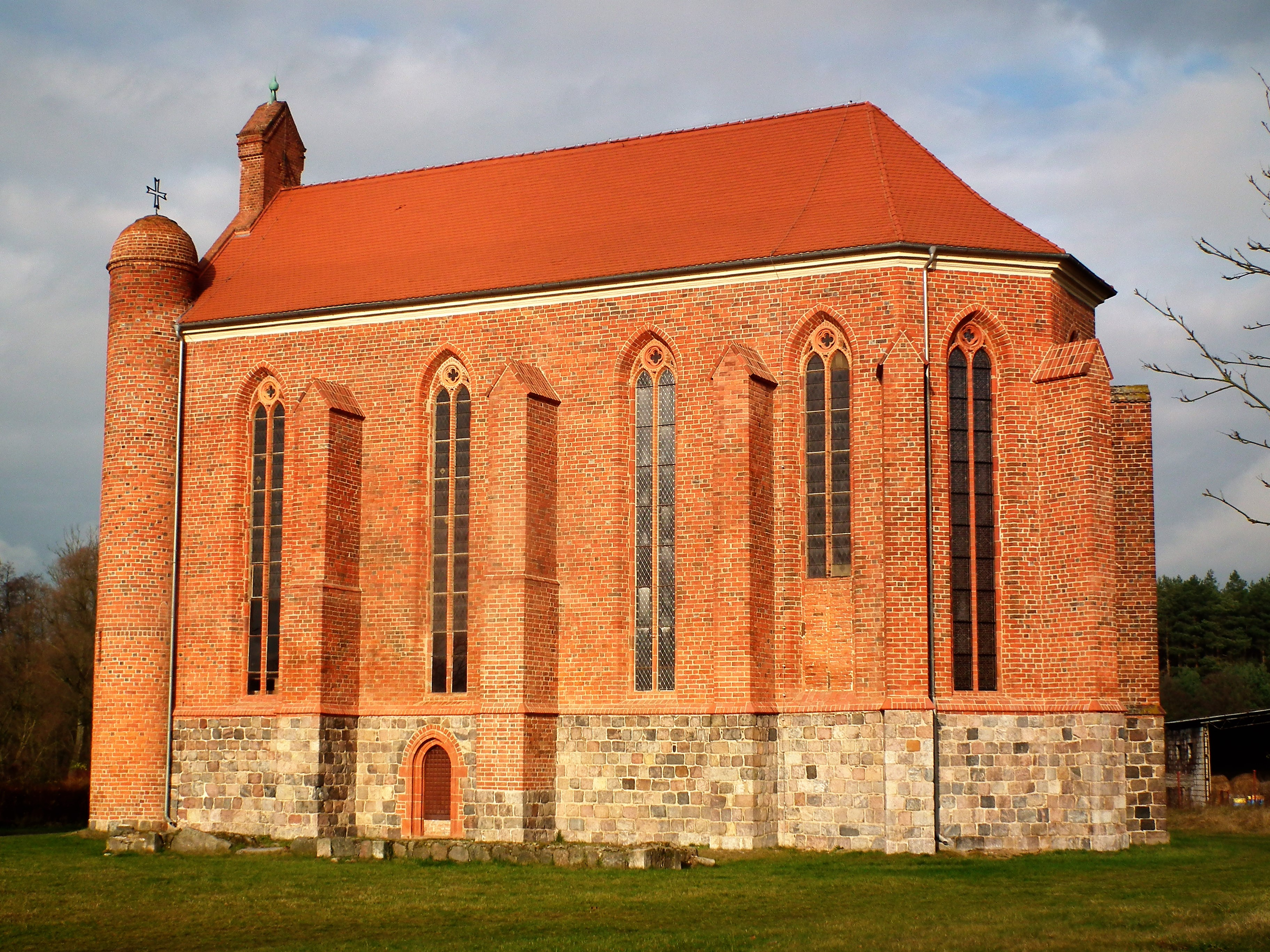
Saint Stanislaus Kostka church, Chwarszczany

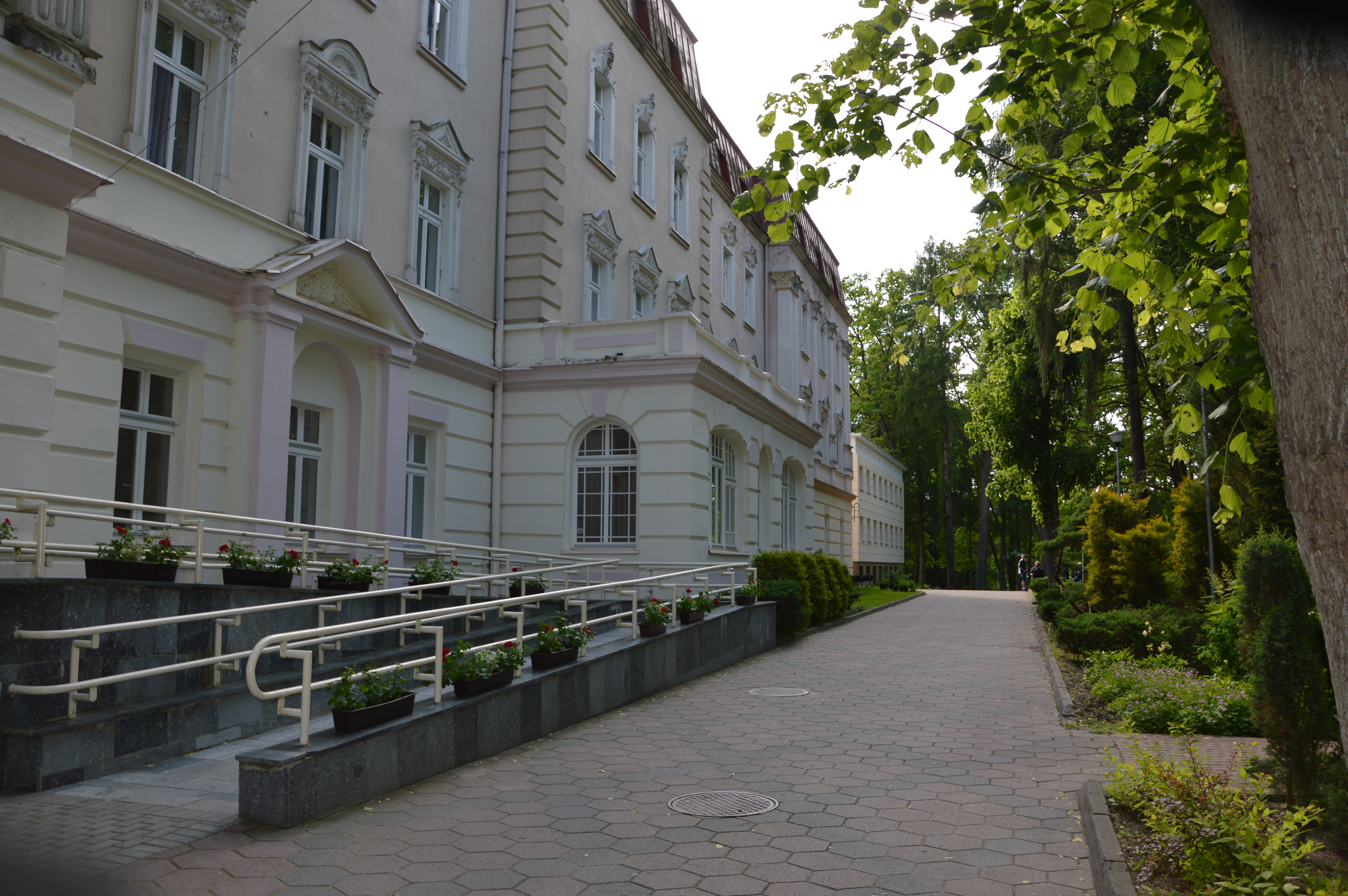
Sanatorium Gryf, Połczyn-Zdrój

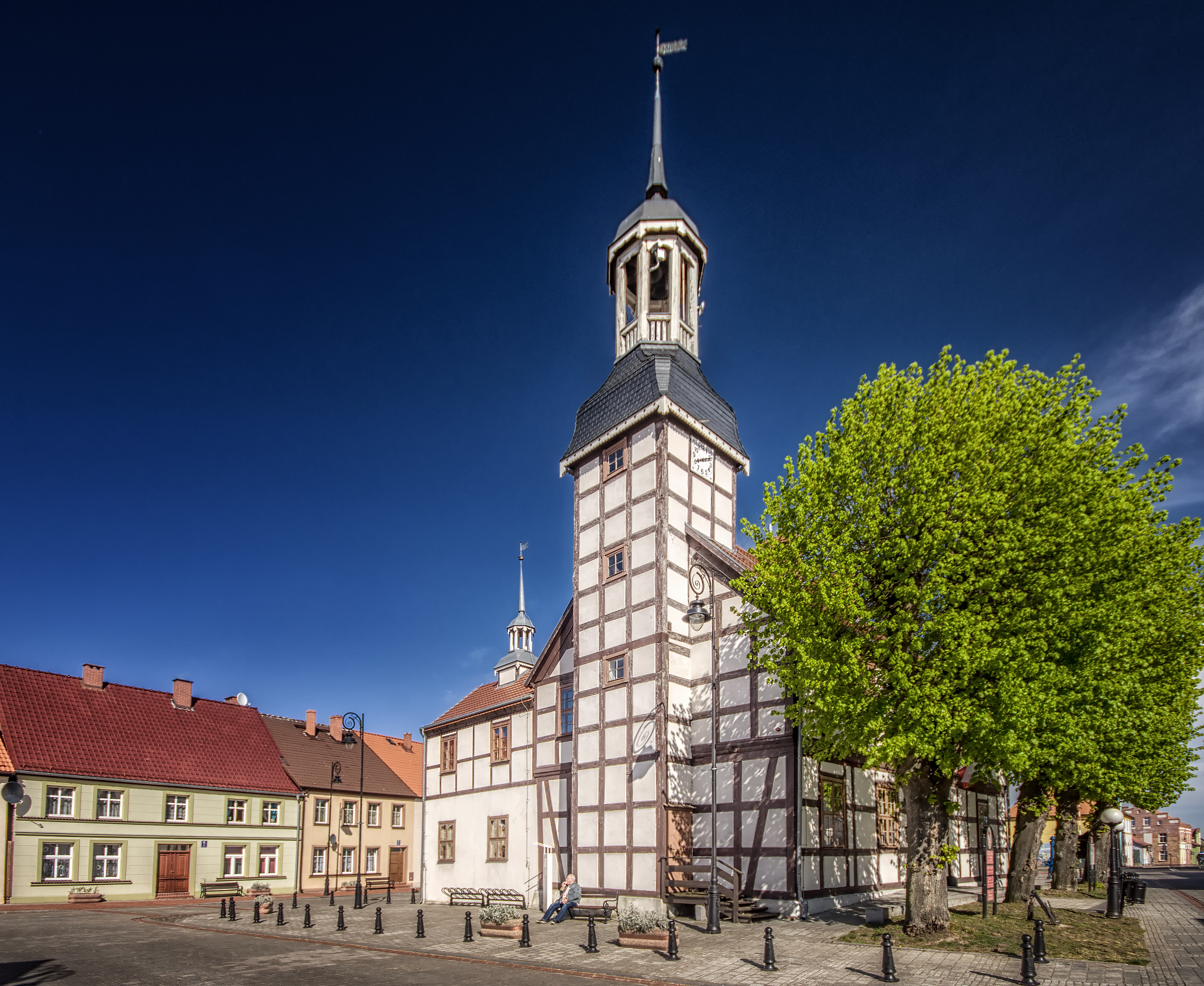
Town Hall, Nowe Warpno

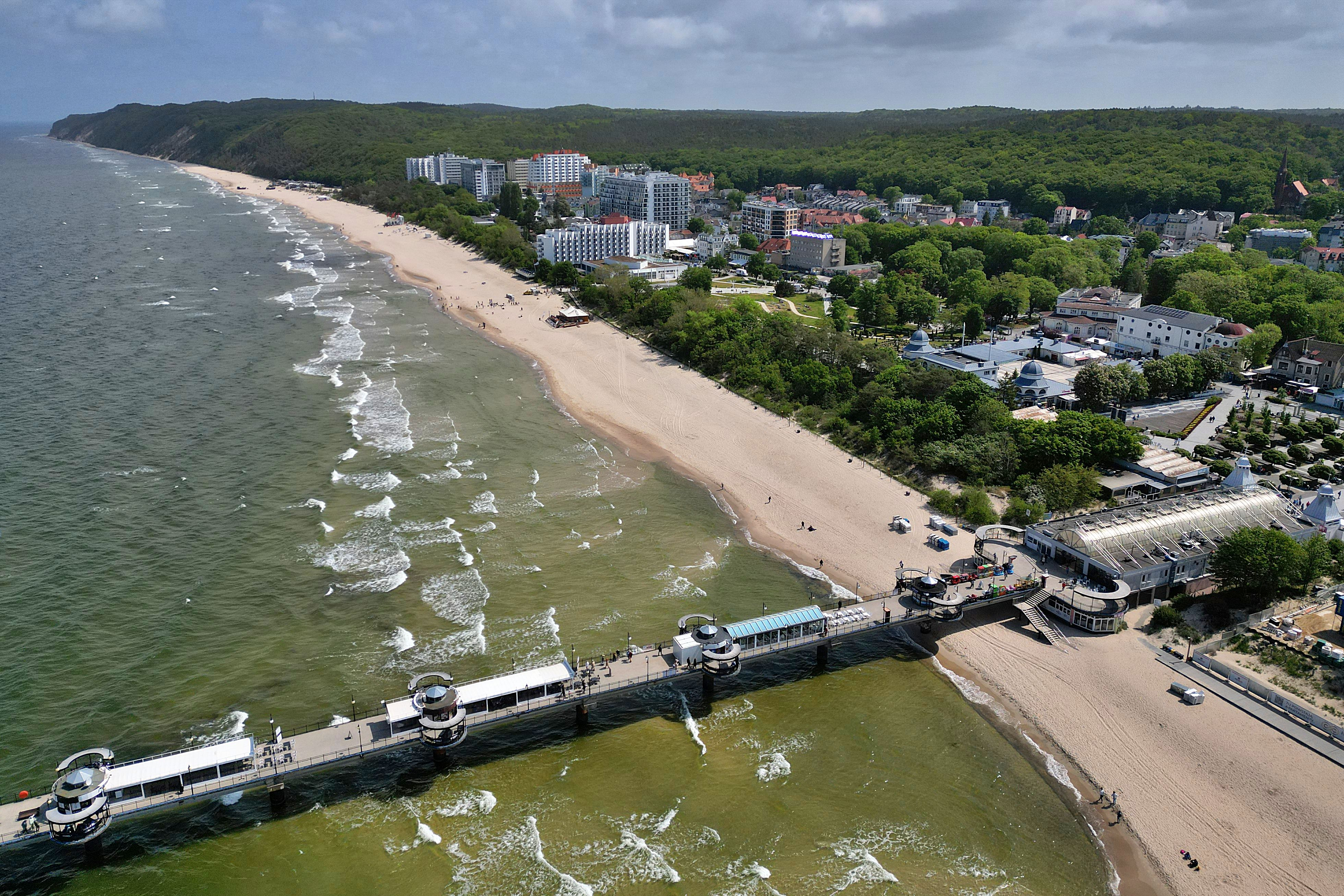
Beach and pier, Międzyzdroje

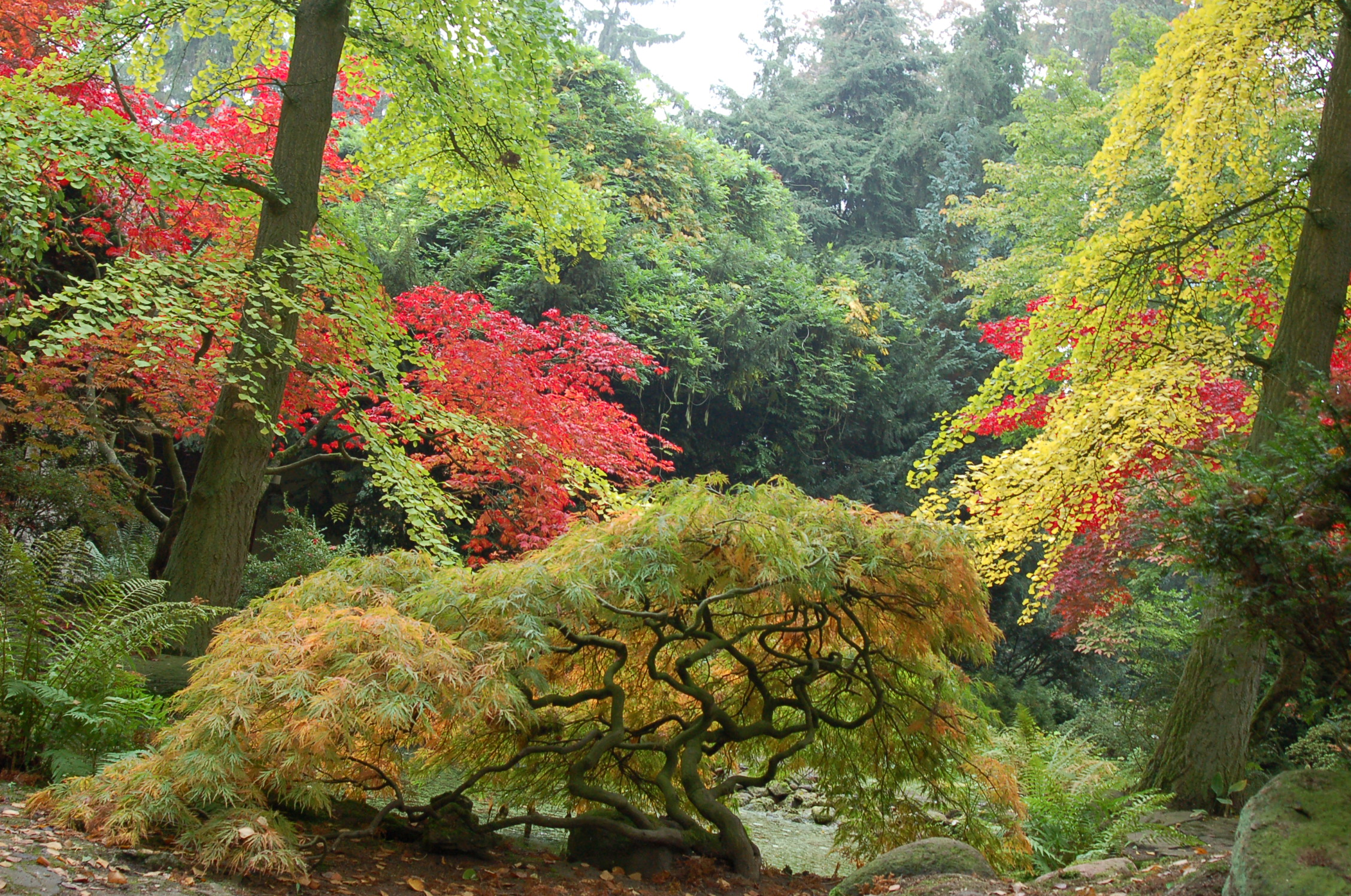
Dendrological Garden, Przelewice

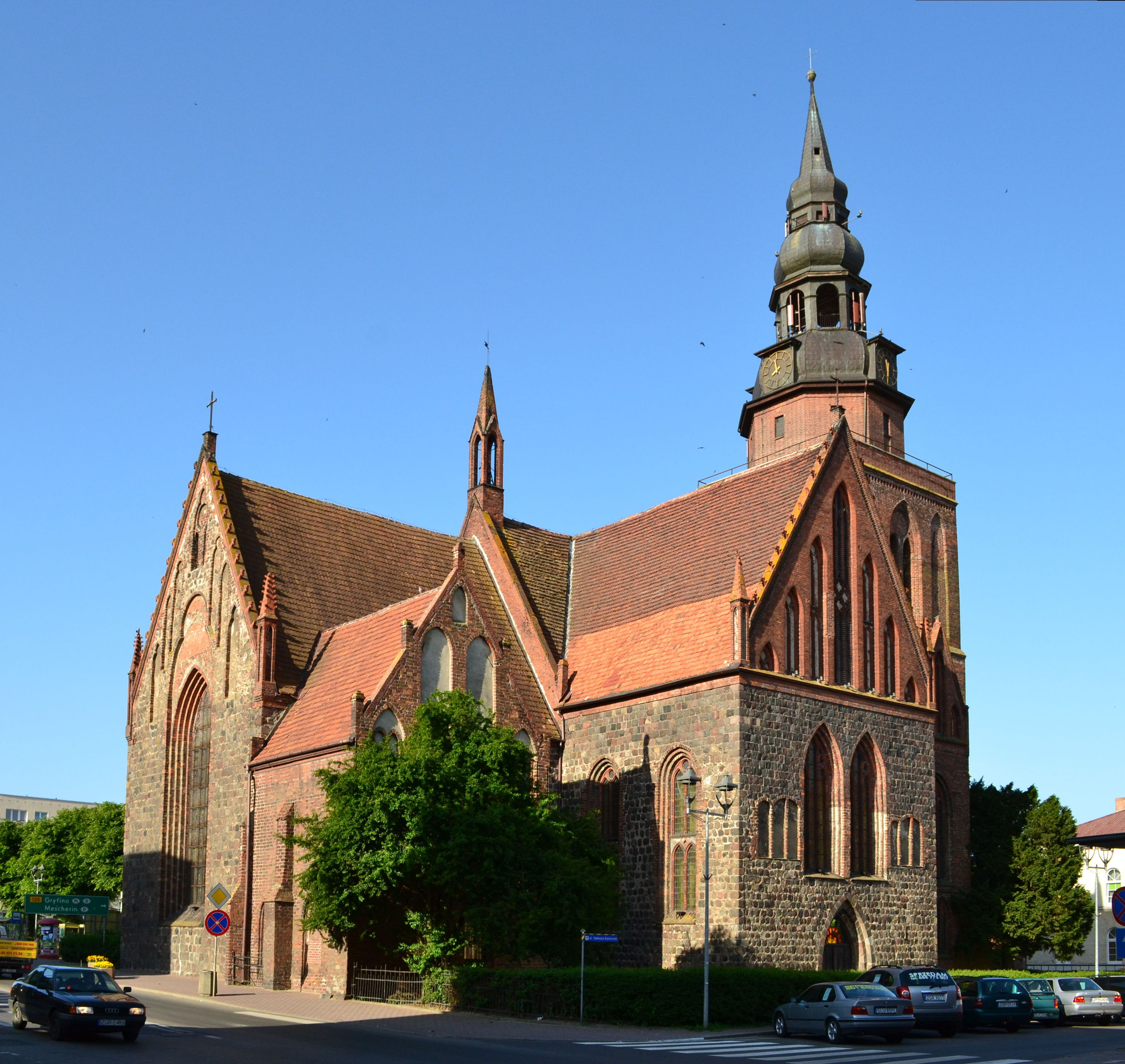
Church of the Nativity, Gryfino

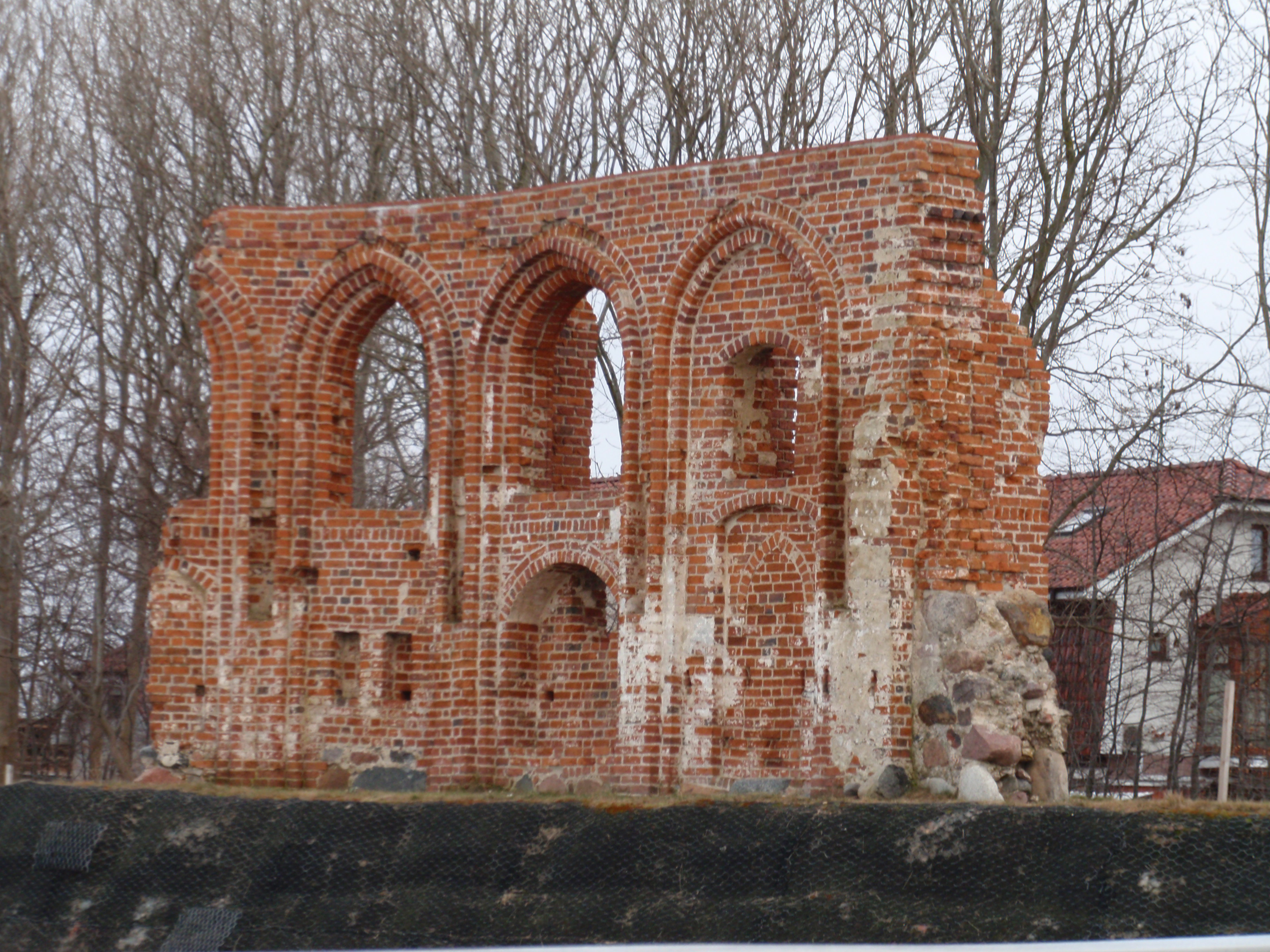
Ruins of the church in Trzęsacz

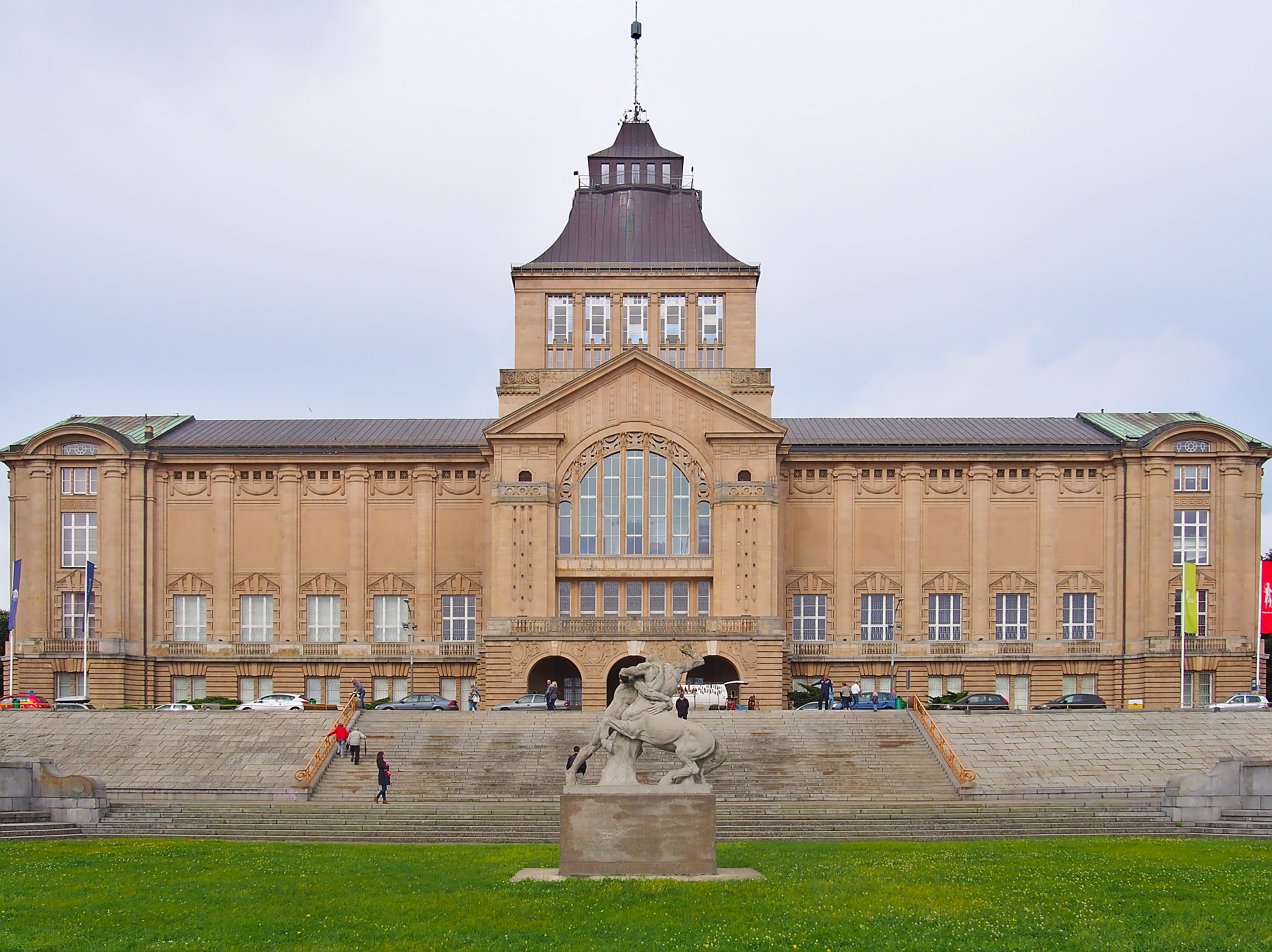
National Museum in Szczecin

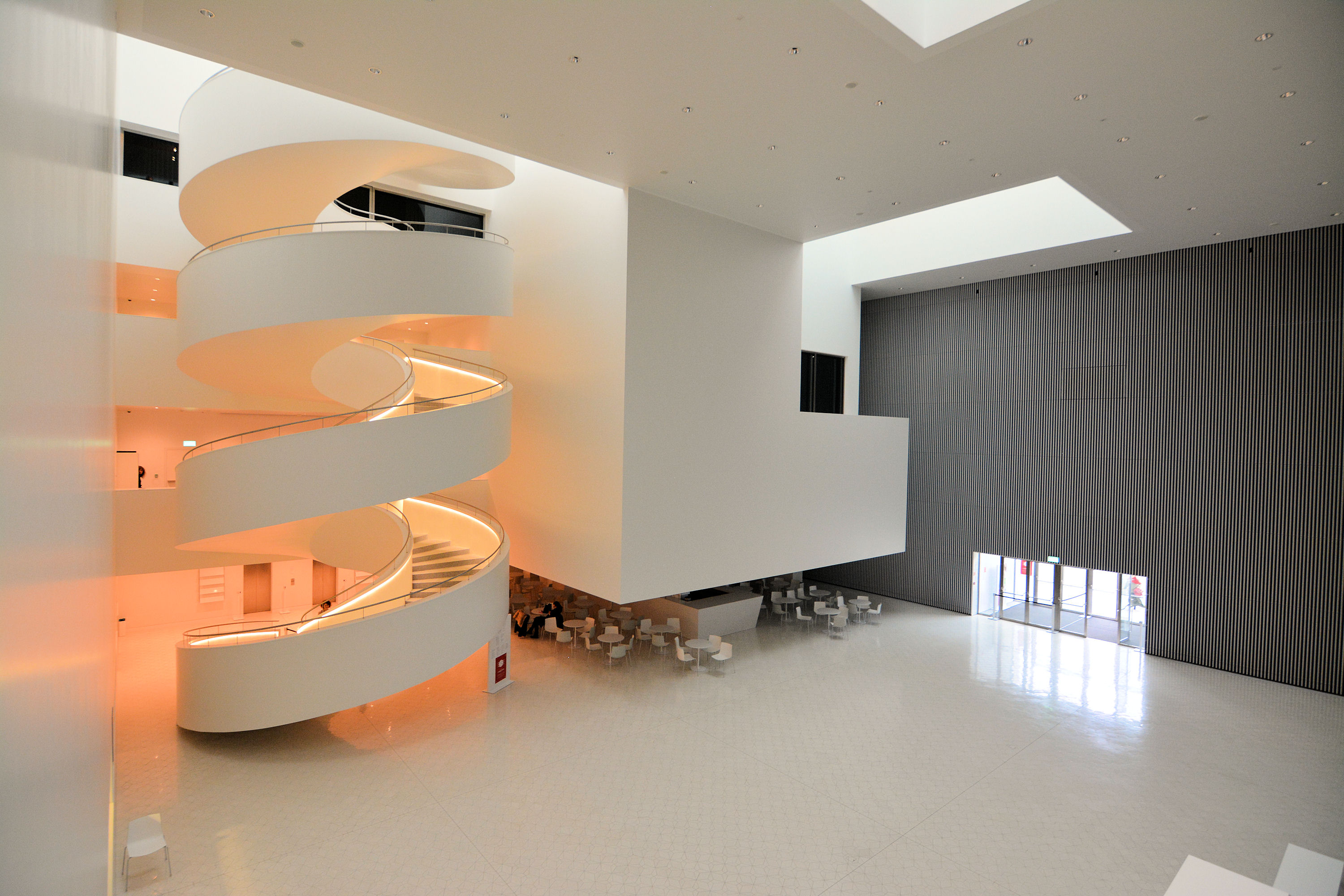
Szczecin Philharmonic

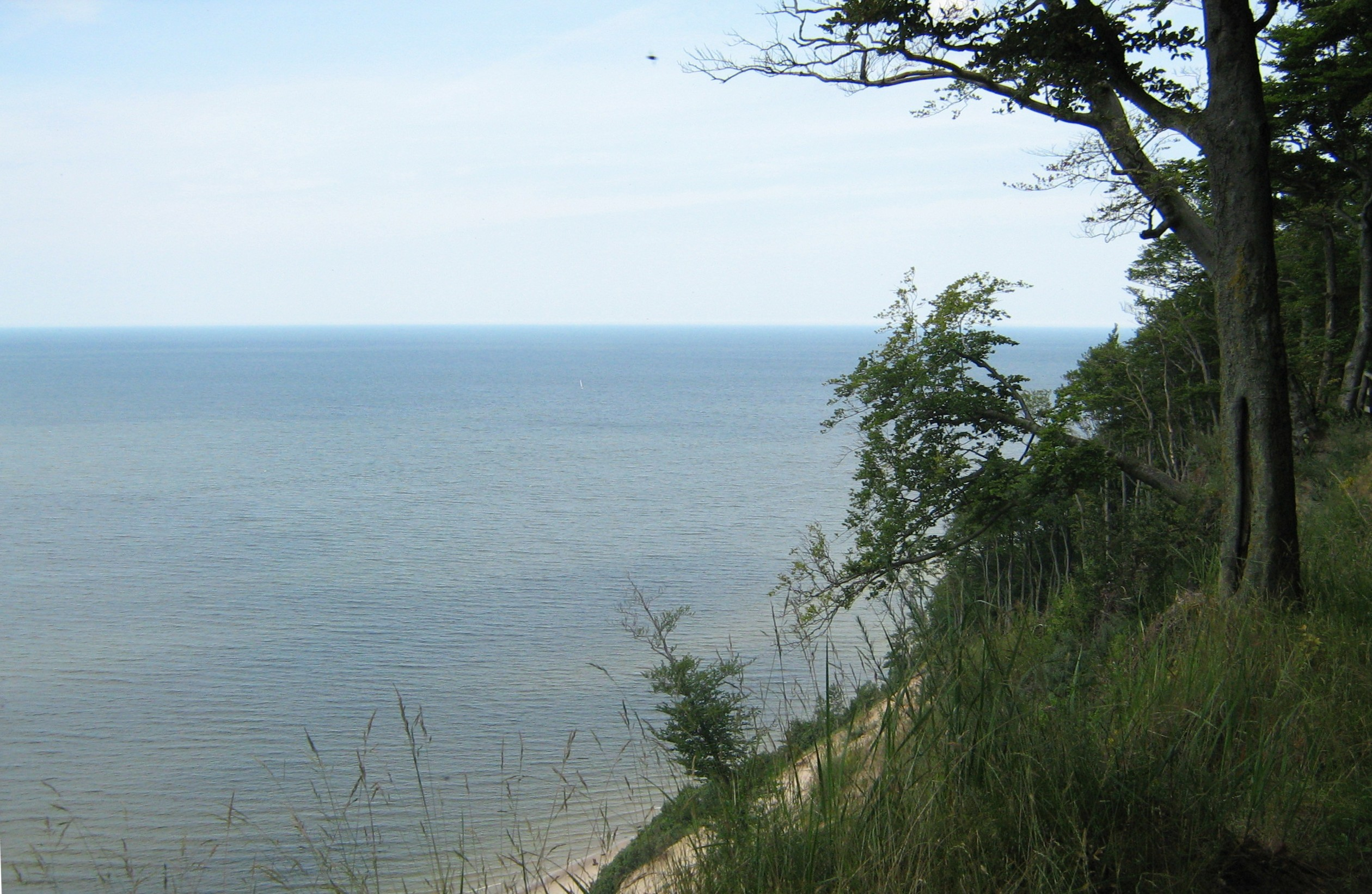
Gosań cliff, Wolin National Park

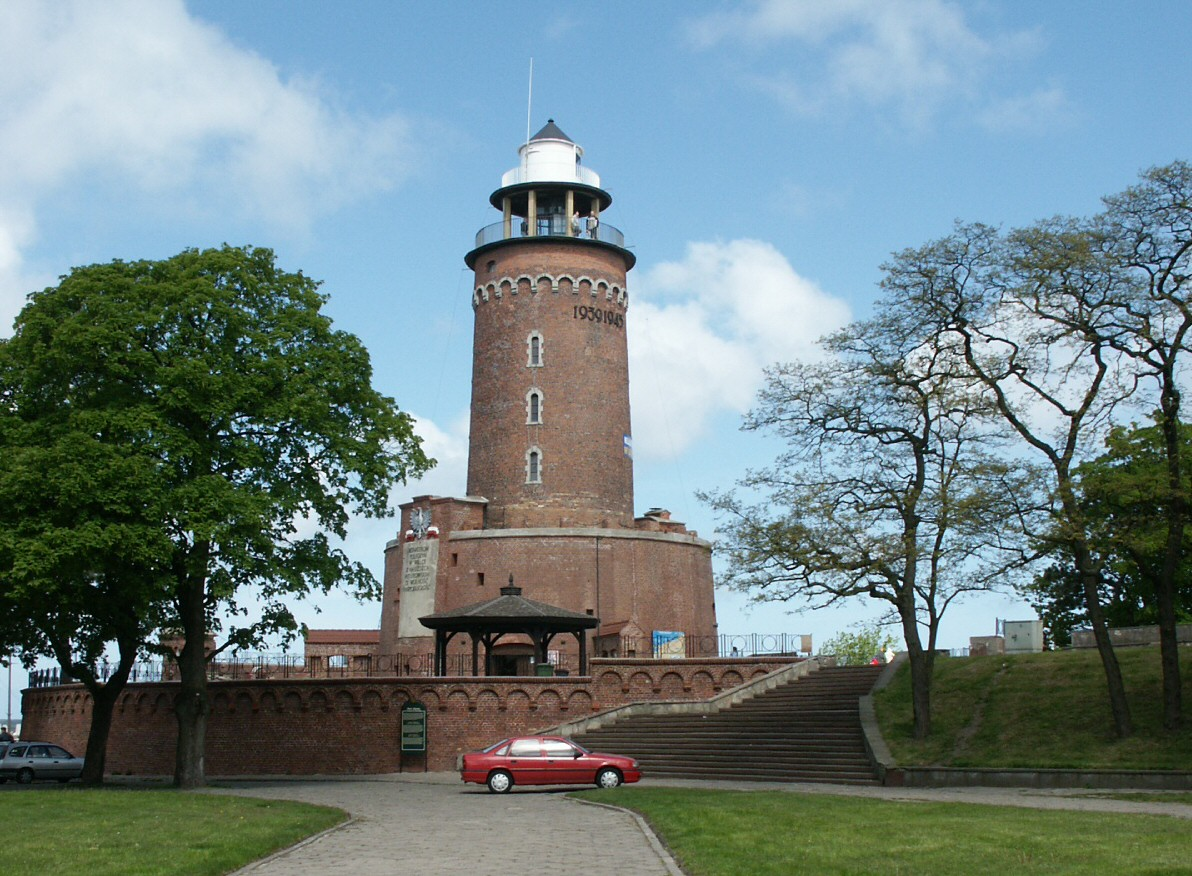
Lighthouse in Kołobrzeg

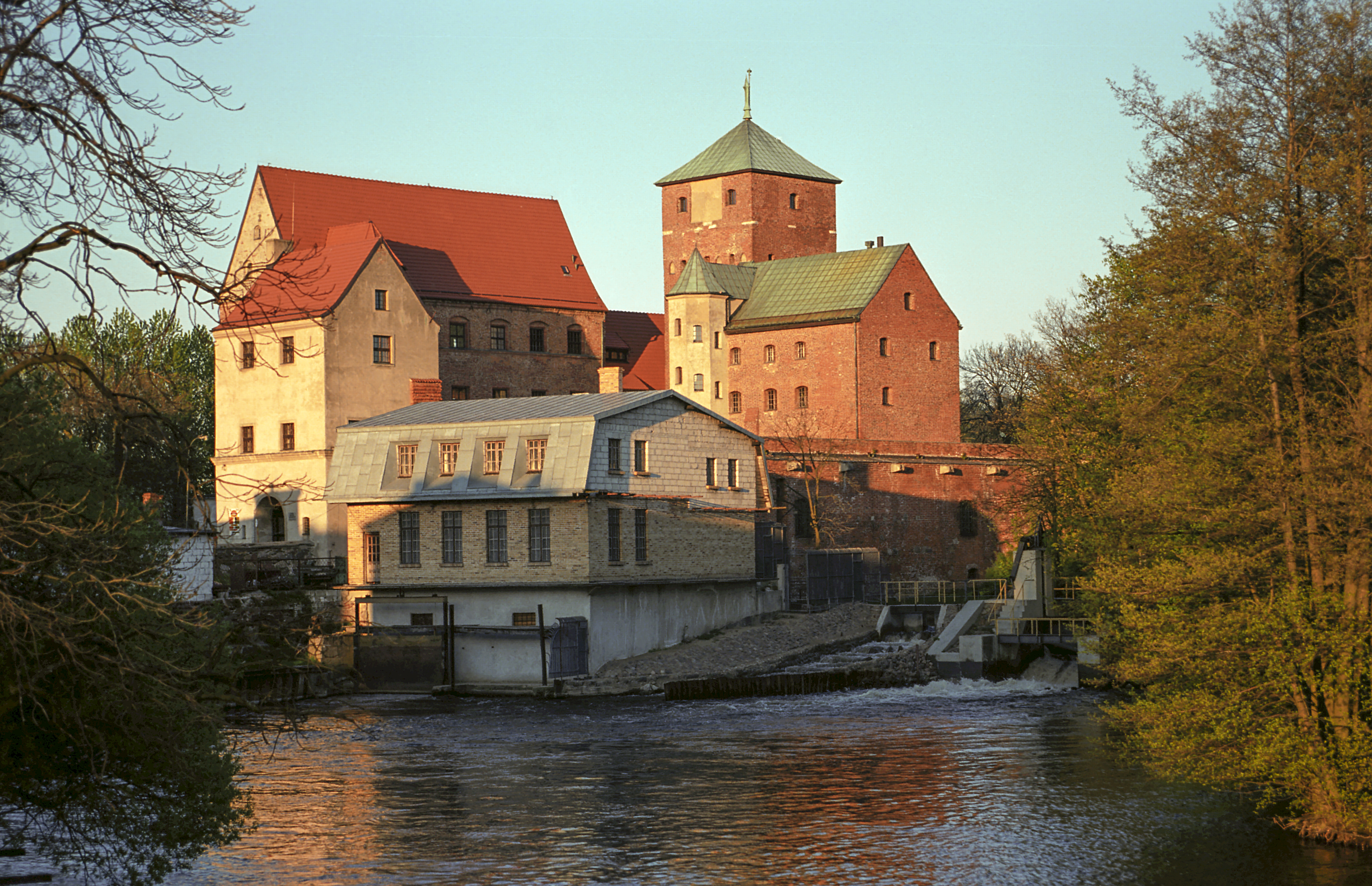
Pomeranian Dukes' Castle in Darłowo

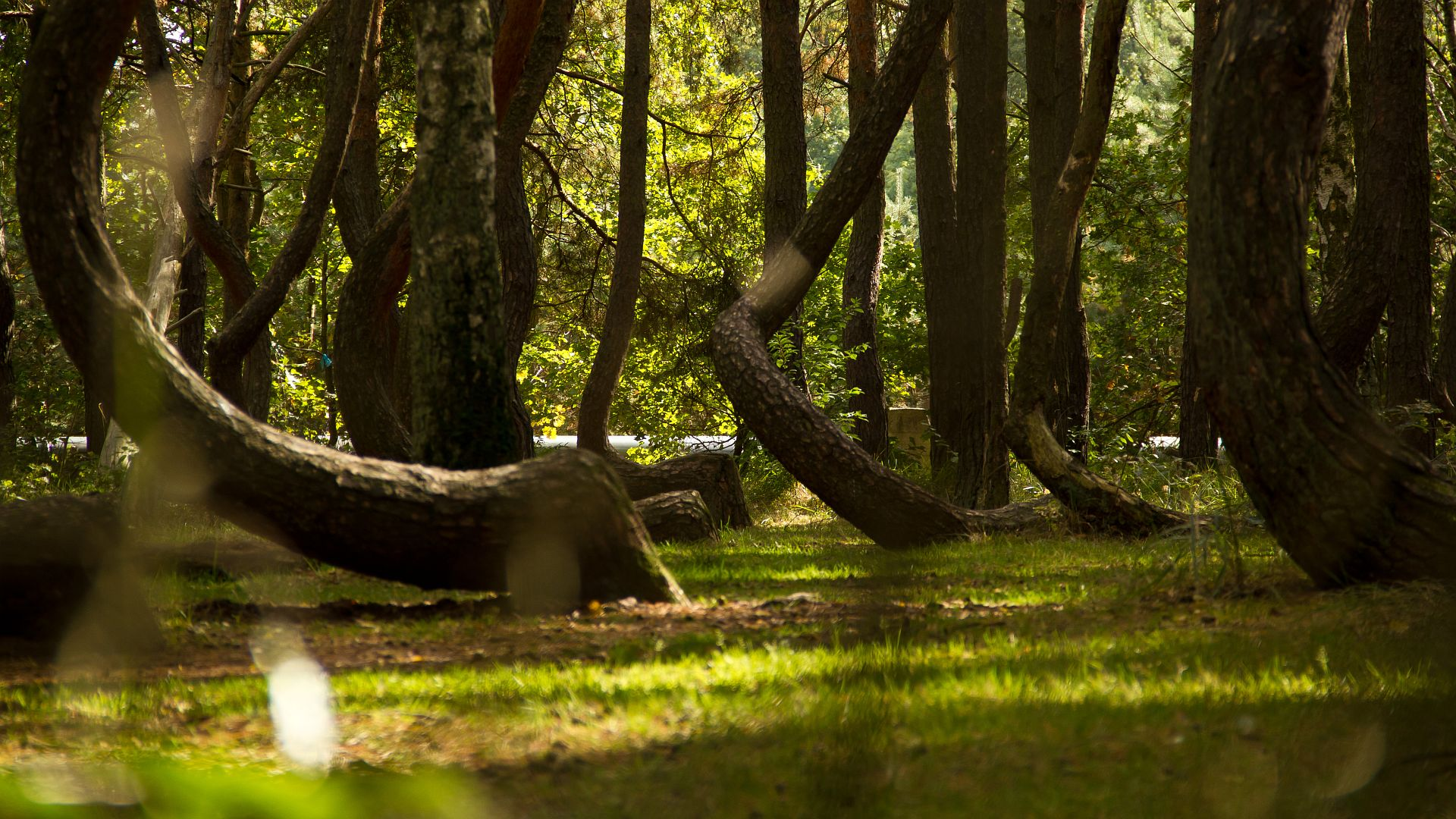
Crooked Forest

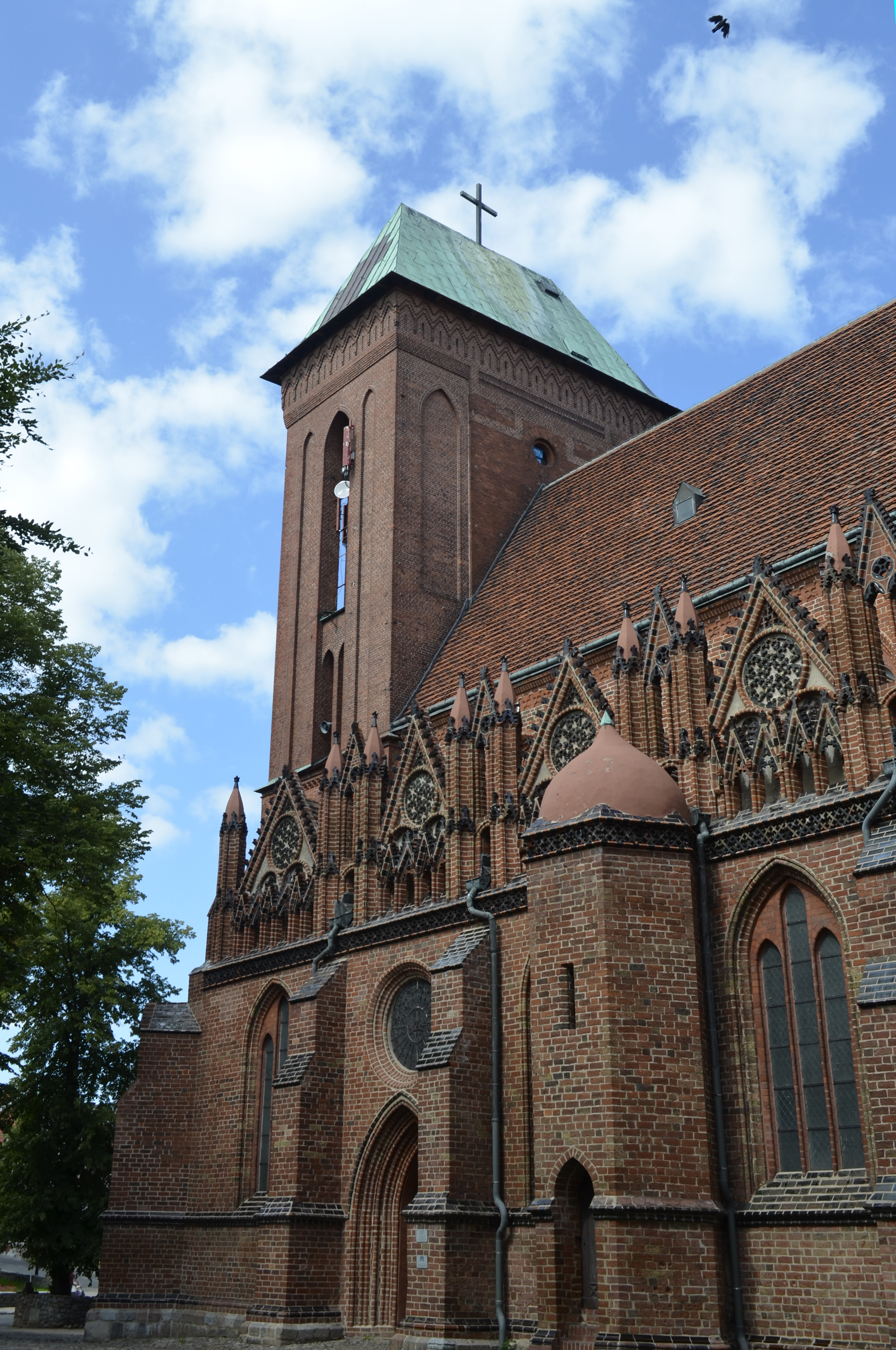
Cathedral of St. John the Baptist in Kamień Pomorski

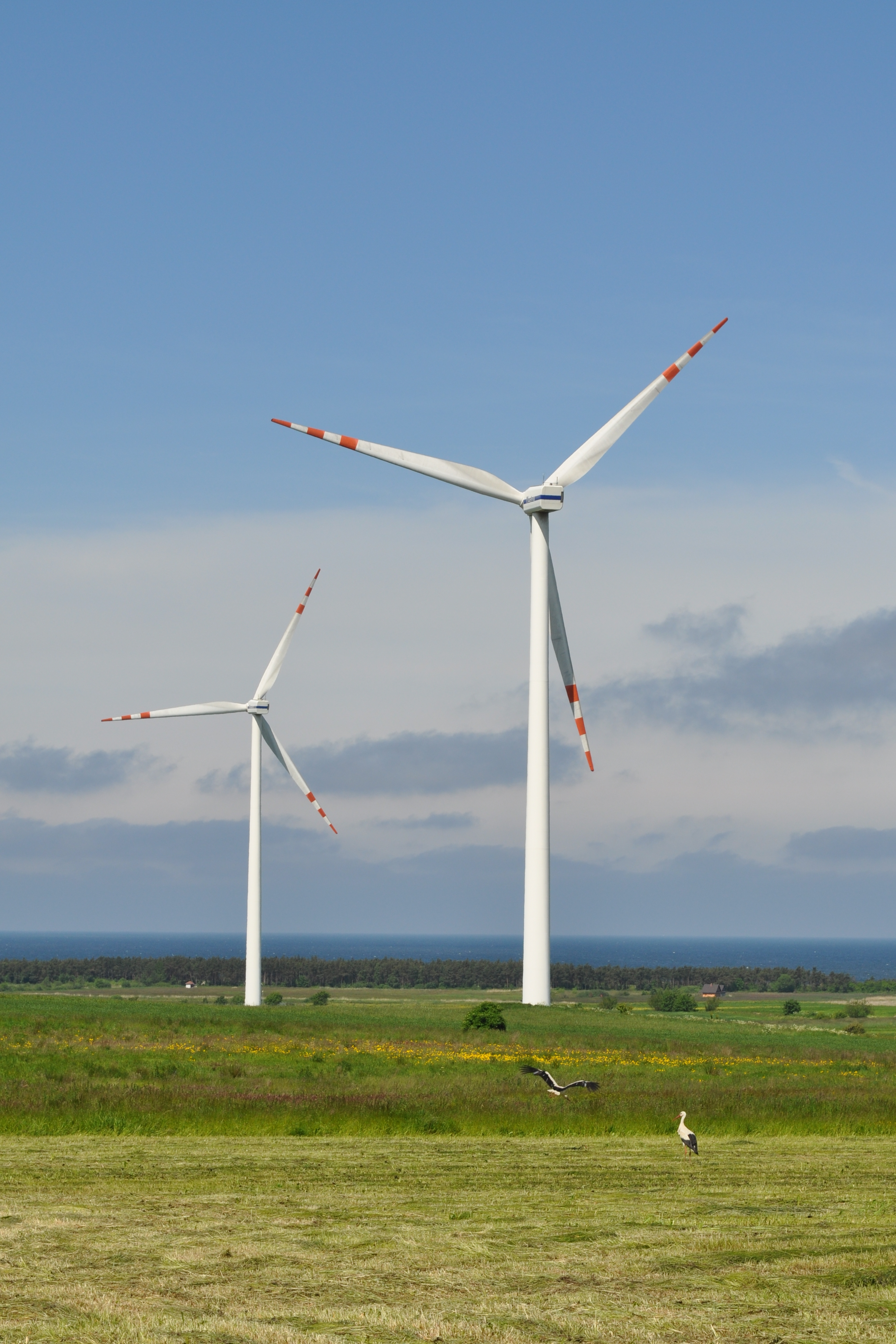
Wind turbines in Cisowo

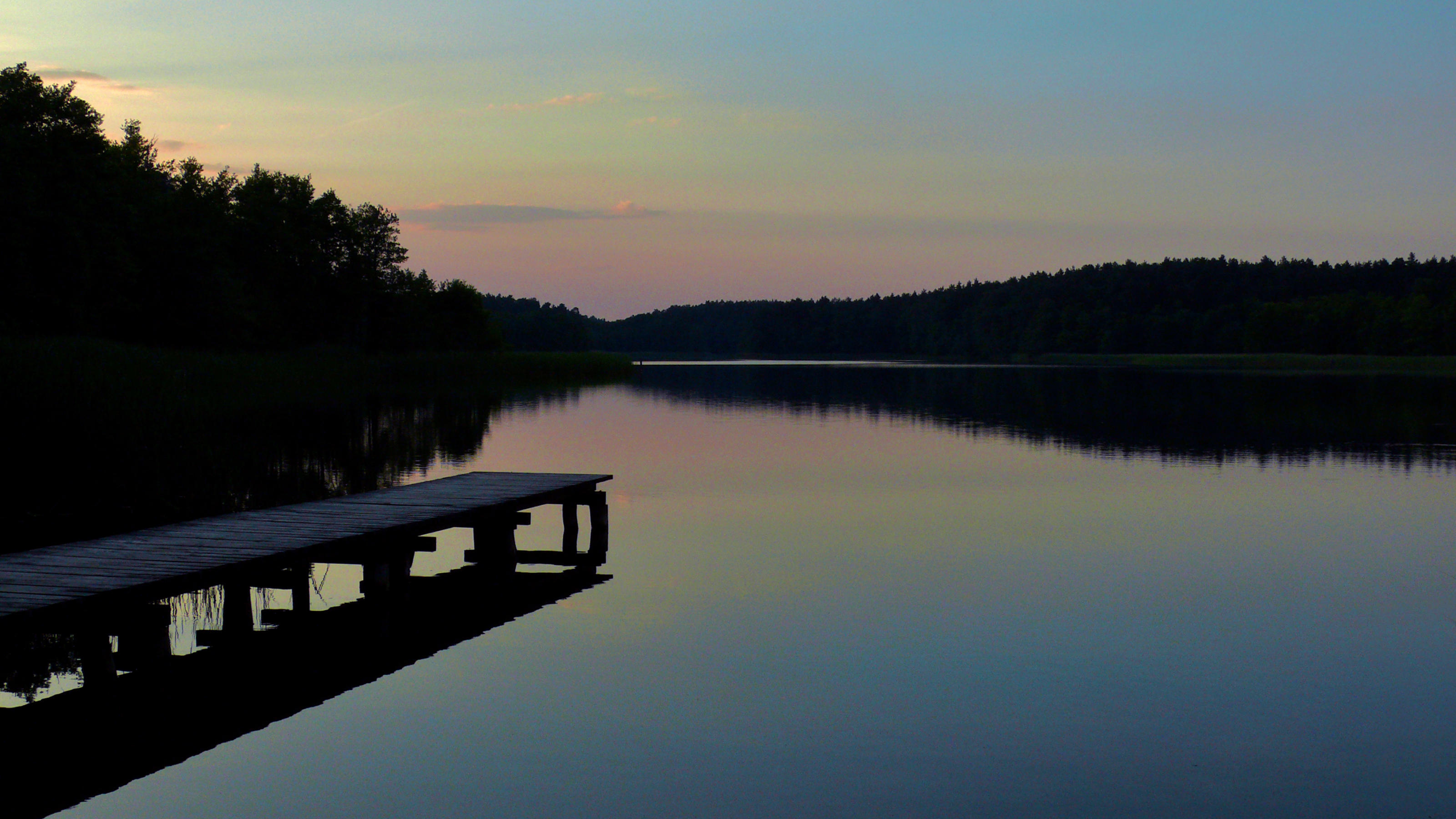
Lake Ostrowiec

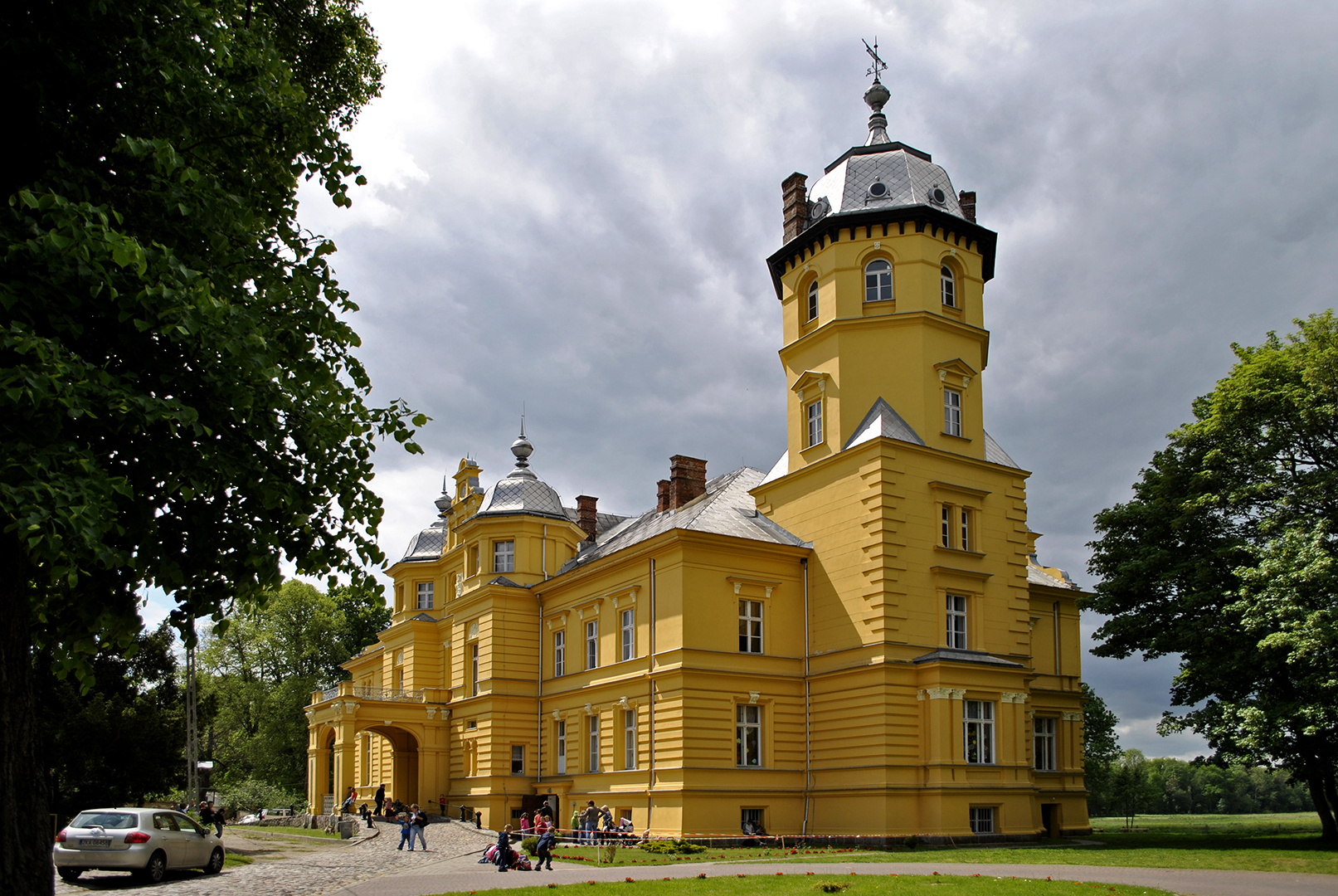
Stuchowo Palace

== See also ==
- Dukes of Pomerania
- History of Pomerania
- Karwowo Lake
- Pomeranian (disambiguation)
- Prussia's Province of Pomerania
- Province of Pomerania (1653-1815)
