= Szczeciński Park Naukowo-Technologiczny =

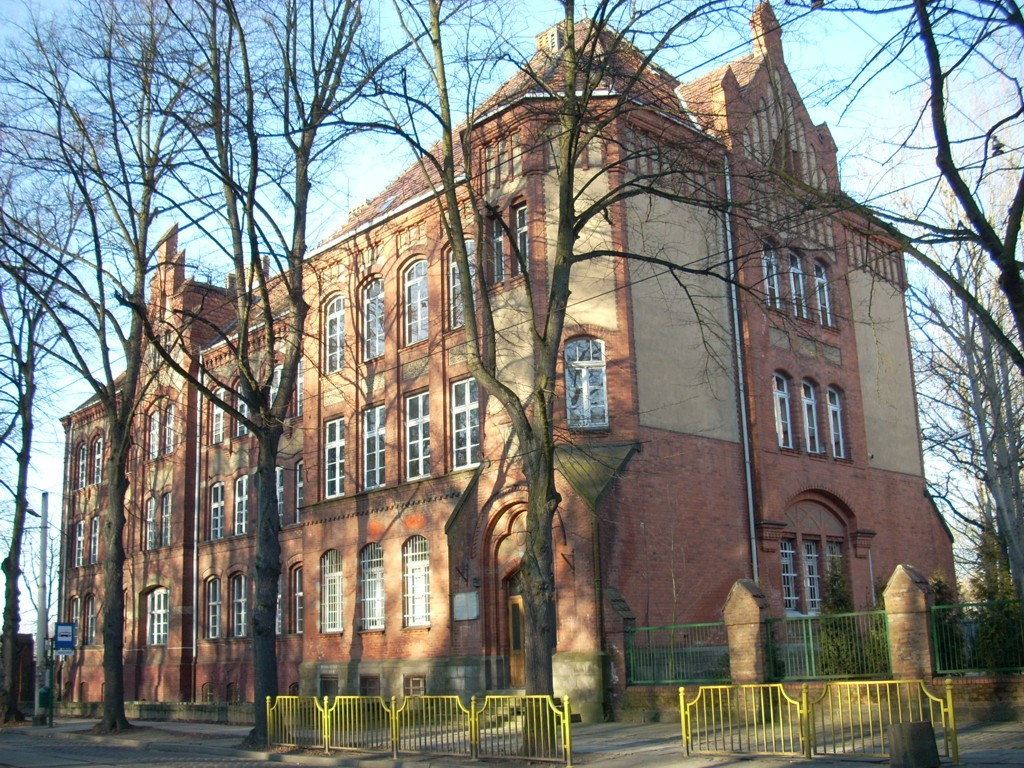

Szczeciński Park Naukowo-Technologiczny is a science park in the centre of Szczecin, in north-west West Pomeranian Voivodeship, Poland. In the area is the University of Szczecin, West Pomeranian University of Technology, Pomeranian Medical University, Maritime University of Szczecin, West Pomeranian Business School, Szczecin Shipyard, Zakłady Chemiczne Police SA (Police), ship (Szczecin-Świnoujście Harbour and Police Harbour), road and rail transport and Szczecin-Goleniów "Solidarność" Airport (Goleniów).
