= Trzebawie =

- Village
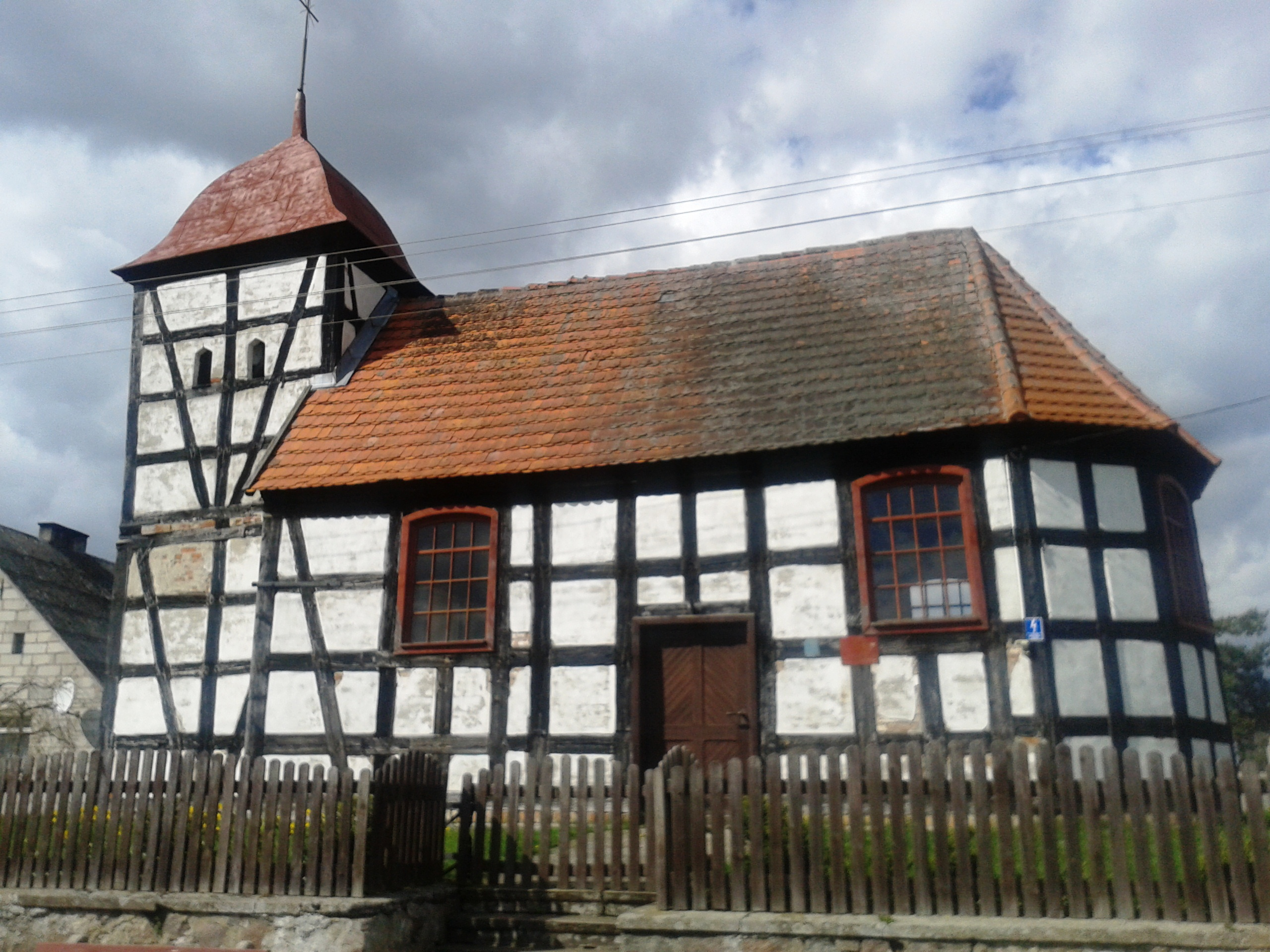
- Village church

- Location within Poland
- Coordinates: 53°32′N 15°26′E
- Country: Poland
- Voivodeship: West Pomeranian
- County: Łobez
- Gmina: Węgorzyno

Trzebawie [tʂɛˈbavjɛ] (German Altenfließ) is a village in the administrative district of Gmina Węgorzyno, within Łobez County, West Pomeranian Voivodeship, in north-western Poland. It lies approximately 9 km (6 mi) west of Węgorzyno, 17 km (11 mi) south-west of Łobez, and 58 km (36 mi) east of the regional capital Szczecin, near the eastern shore of the 9.5-kilometre-long Woświn Lake.

== History ==
By the late 13th century, Altenfließ was a fief of the ancient noble (Uradel) family of Wedel. In the early 14th century, Oldenvlete, belonged to a branch of this family, who had their seat in Mellen and who also owned Silligsdorf.

In 1713, Altenfließ was sold to a Matthias von Pritz, but was acquired by Colonel Carl Friedrich von Wedel in 1757 and thus returned to the House of Wedel. From 1854, discussions with the authorities took place, because Altenfließ was run as a manorial estate, without meeting the minimum size for one of 1,000 morgens in accordance with a Royal Decree of 1825. This question was not resolved until 1861.

Around 1860, the manorial fief of Altenfließ, i.e. the estate itself, comprised 952 acres of land, of which 661 acres was arable land, and hand 63 inhabitants. In addition there was the village of Altenfließ, i.e. the rural municipality with 556 acres of land, 351 acres of arable land, and 77 inhabitants. The church was a daughter church of the one in Mellen.

Later, the estate of Altenfließ was integrated into the rural municipality. Until 1945 Altenfließ formed a rural community in the county of Regenwalde in the Province of Pomerania. Apart from the village of Altenfließ itself, there were no other dwellings.

In 1945, the village was renamed Trzebawie when it became part of Poland, due to the border changes demanded by the Soviet Union at the Potsdam Conference. The original German population was expelled.

== Population ==
- 1885: 155 inhabitants
- 1925: 73 inhabitants
- 1933: 136 inhabitants
- 1939: 157 inhabitants

== Literature ==
- Heinrich Berghaus: Landbuch des Herzogtums Pommern. Part II, Vol. 7. Berlin und Wriezen 1874, pp. 684–687 (online).
