= Święciechowo =

- Village
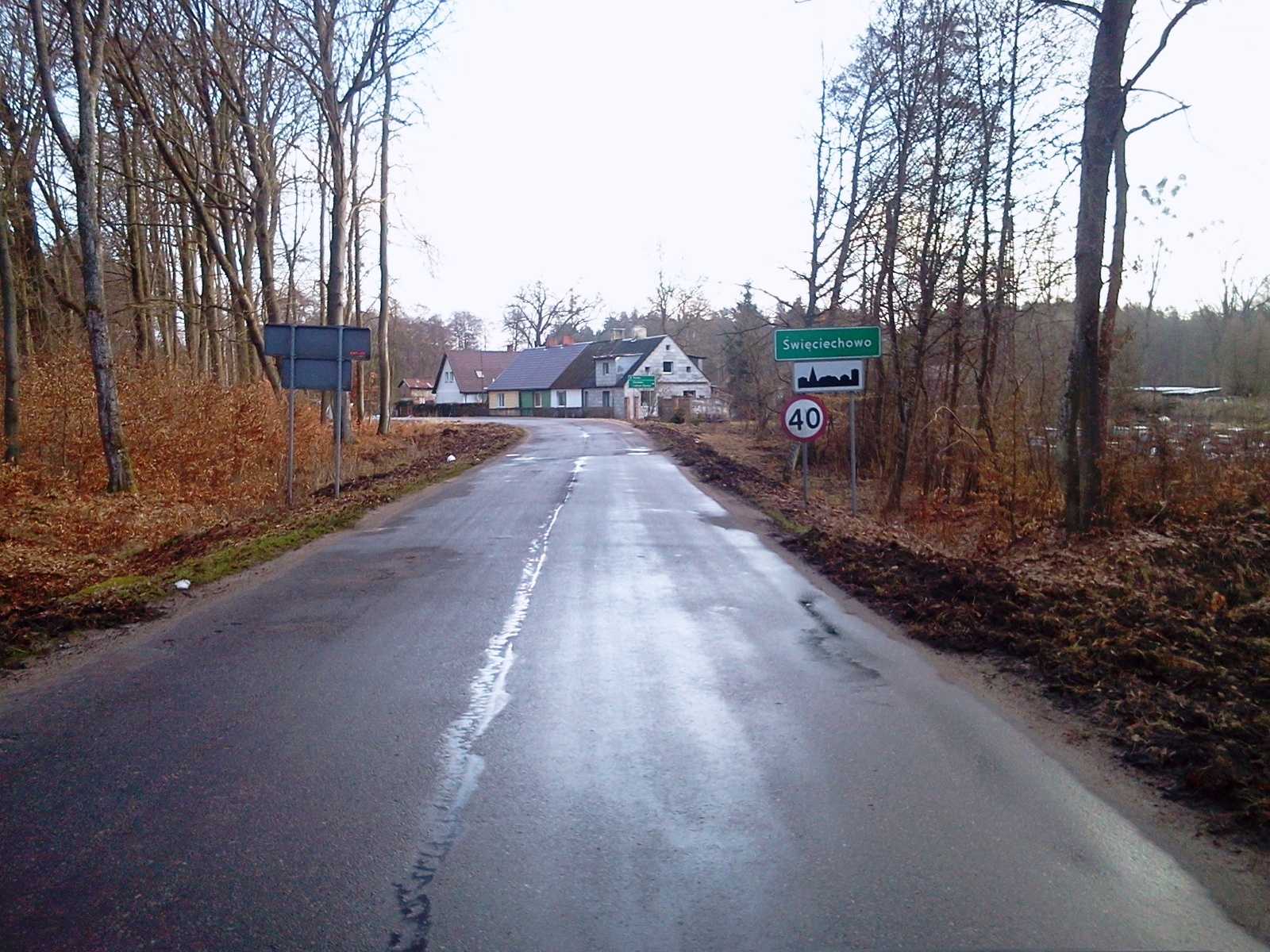
- Święciechowo

- Location within Poland
- Coordinates: 53°43′23″N 15°24′35″E
- Country: Poland
- Voivodeship: West Pomeranian
- County: Łobez
- Gmina: Resko
- Time zone: UTC+1 (CET)
  - Summer (DST): UTC+2 (CEST)
- Vehicle registration: ZLO

Święciechowo (Polish: [ɕfjɛɲt͡ɕɛˈxɔvɔ]; German: Grünhof) is a village in the administrative district of Gmina Resko, within Łobez County, West Pomeranian Voivodeship, in north-western Poland. It lies approximately 9 km (6 mi) south of Resko, 17 km (11 mi) north-west of Łobez, and 65 km (40 mi) north-east of the regional capital Szczecin.

During World War II, the German Nazi government operated a forced labour subcamp of the Stalag II-D prisoner-of-war camp in the village.
