= Sosnowo, Łobez County =

Sosnowo
- Village
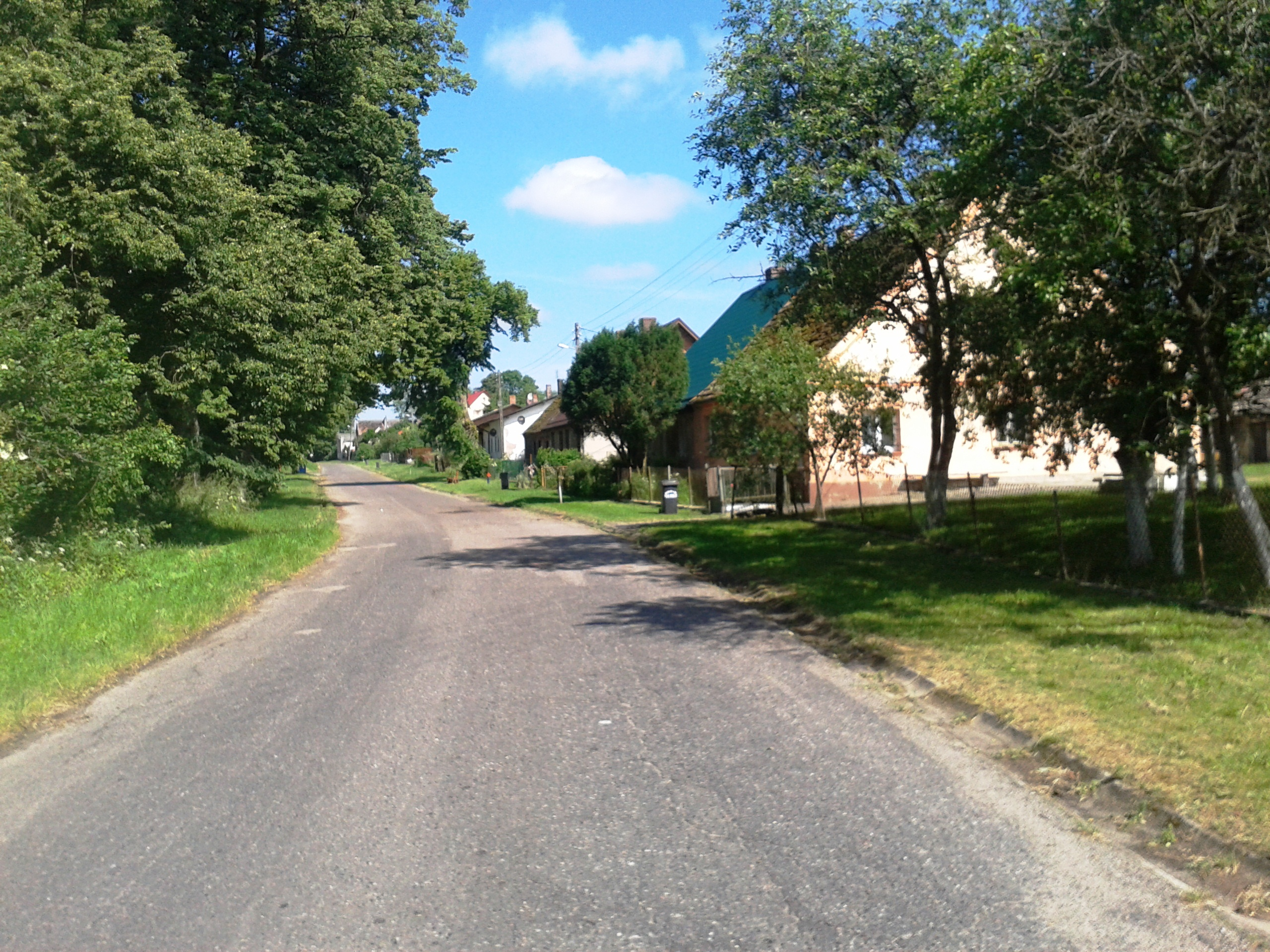

- Location within Poland
- Coordinates: 53°45′57″N 15°31′4″E
- Country: Poland
- Voivodeship: West Pomeranian
- County: Łobez
- Gmina: Resko
- Time zone: UTC+1 (CET)
  - Summer (DST): UTC+2 (CEST)
- Vehicle registration: ZLO

Sosnowo [sɔsˈnɔvɔ] is a village in the administrative district of Gmina Resko, within Łobez County, West Pomeranian Voivodeship, in north-western Poland. It lies approximately 9 kilometres (6 mi) south-east of Resko, 17 km (11 mi) north-west of Łobez, and 73 km (45 mi) north-east of the regional capital Szczecin.

== History ==
During World War II, the Germans operated a forced labour subcamp of the Stalag II-D prisoner-of-war camp in the village.

== See also ==
- History of Pomerania
