= Gardzin =

- Village
- Location within Poland
- Coordinates: 53°47′11″N 15°29′19″E
- Country: Poland
- Voivodeship: West Pomeranian
- County: Łobez
- Gmina: Resko

Gardzin (Polish pronunciation: [ˈɡard͡ʑin]; formerly German: Gardin) is a village in the administrative district of Gmina Resko, within Łobez County, West Pomeranian Voivodeship, in north-western Poland. It lies approximately 7 km (4 mi) east of Resko, 19 km (12 mi) north-west of Łobez, and 73 km (45 mi) north-east of the regional capital Szczecin.

For the history of the region, see History of Pomerania.
