= Przemysław, West Pomeranian Voivodeship =

Przemysław
- Settlement
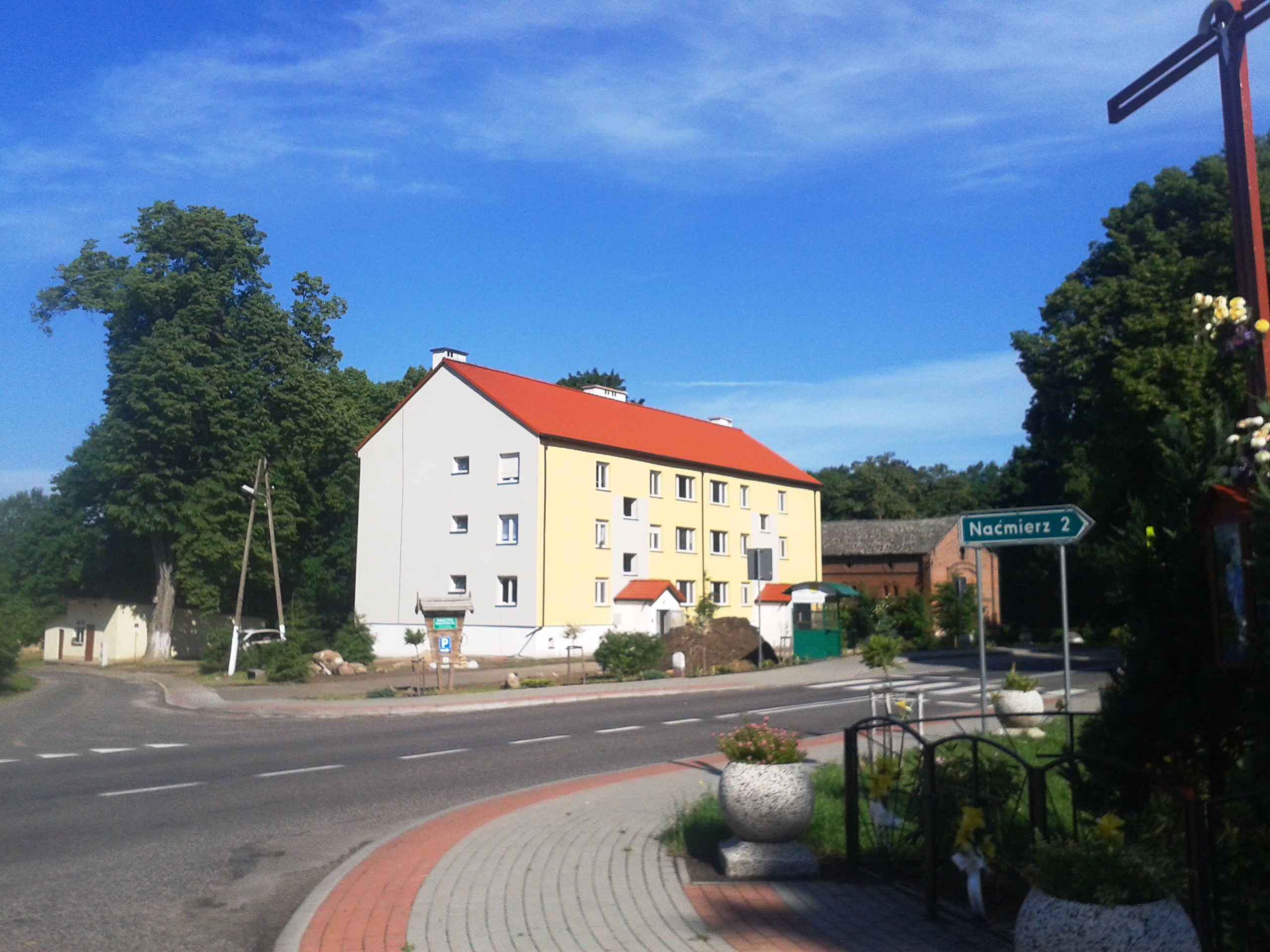
- Przemysław

- Location within Poland
- Coordinates: 53°44′0″N 15°34′9″E
- Country: Poland
- Voivodeship: West Pomeranian
- County: Łobez
- Gmina: Resko

Przemysław (Polish pronunciation: [pʂɛˈmɨswaf]; German: Premslaff) is a settlement in the administrative district of Gmina Resko, within Łobez County, West Pomeranian Voivodeship, in north-western Poland. It lies approximately 14 km (9 mi) south-east of Resko, 12 km (7 mi) north of Łobez, and 75 km (47 mi) north-east of the regional capital Szczecin.

For the history of the region, see History of Pomerania.
