= Piaski, Łobez County =

Piaski
- Village
- Location within Poland
- Coordinates: 53°44′37″N 15°23′9″E
- Country: Poland
- Voivodeship: West Pomeranian
- County: Łobez
- Gmina: Resko
- Time zone: UTC+1 (CET)
  - Summer (DST): UTC+2 (CEST)
- Postal code: 72-315
- Vehicle registration: ZLO

Piaski (Polish pronunciation: [ˈpjaskʲi]) is a village in the administrative district of Gmina Resko, within Łobez County, West Pomeranian Voivodeship, in north-western Poland. It lies approximately 7 km (4 mi) south of Resko, 20 km (12 mi) north-west of Łobez, and 65 km (40 mi) north-east of the regional capital Szczecin.
