= Łabuń Mały =

- Village
- Location within Poland
- Coordinates: 53°47′45″N 15°26′26″E
- Country: Poland
- Voivodeship: West Pomeranian
- County: Łobez
- Gmina: Resko

Łabuń Mały (Polish pronunciation: [ˈwabuj̃ ˈmawɨ]; German: Neu Labuhn) is a village in the administrative district of Gmina Resko, within Łobez County, West Pomeranian Voivodeship, in north-western Poland. It lies approximately 3 km (2 mi) east of Resko, 22 km (14 mi) north-west of Łobez, and 71 km (44 mi) north-east of the regional capital Szczecin.

For the history of the region, see History of Pomerania.
