= Stołążek =

- Village
- Location within Poland
- Coordinates: 53°51′22″N 15°29′0″E
- Country: Poland
- Voivodeship: West Pomeranian
- County: Łobez
- Gmina: Resko
- Time zone: UTC+1 (CET)
  - Summer (DST): UTC+2 (CEST)
- Vehicle registration: ZLO

Stołążek [stɔˈwɔ̃ʐɛk] is a village in the administrative district of Gmina Resko, within Łobez County, West Pomeranian Voivodeship, in north-western Poland. It lies approximately 9 km (6 mi) north-east of Resko, 27 km (17 mi) north of Łobez, and 77 km (48 mi) north-east of the regional capital Szczecin.

Three Polish citizens were murdered by Nazi Germany in the village during World War II.
