= Ługowina =

- Village
- Location within Poland
- Coordinates: 53°45′N 15°25′E
- Country: Poland
- Voivodeship: West Pomeranian
- County: Łobez
- Gmina: Resko

Ługowina [wuɡɔˈvina] (German: Lowin) is a village in the administrative district of Gmina Resko, within Łobez County, West Pomeranian Voivodeship, in north-western Poland. It lies approximately 6 km (4 mi) south of Resko, 19 km (12 mi) north-west of Łobez, and 67 km (42 mi) north-east of the regional capital Szczecin.

For the history of the region, see History of Pomerania.
