= Sienno, West Pomeranian Voivodeship =

Sienno
- Village
- Location within Poland
- Coordinates: 53°44′6″N 15°18′37″E
- Country: Poland
- Voivodeship: West Pomeranian
- County: Łobez
- Gmina: Resko

Sienno [ˈɕɛnnɔ] (German: Kurtsdorf) is a village in the administrative district of Gmina Resko, within Łobez County, West Pomeranian Voivodeship, in north-western Poland. It lies approximately 10 km (6 mi) south-west of Resko, 24 km (15 mi) north-west of Łobez, and 60 km (37 mi) north-east of the regional capital Szczecin.

For the history of the region, see History of Pomerania.
