= Łosośniczka =

- Village
- Location within Poland
- Coordinates: 53°41′37″N 15°17′4″E
- Country: Poland
- Voivodeship: West Pomeranian
- County: Łobez
- Gmina: Resko

Łosośniczka [wɔsɔɕˈnit͡ʂka] (German: Lasbeck) is a village in the administrative district of Gmina Resko, within Łobez County, West Pomeranian Voivodeship, in north-western Poland. It lies approximately 15 km (9 mi) south-west of Resko, 23 km (14 mi) west of Łobez, and 56 km (35 mi) north-east of the regional capital Szczecin.

For the history of the region, see History of Pomerania.
