= Iglice =

- Village
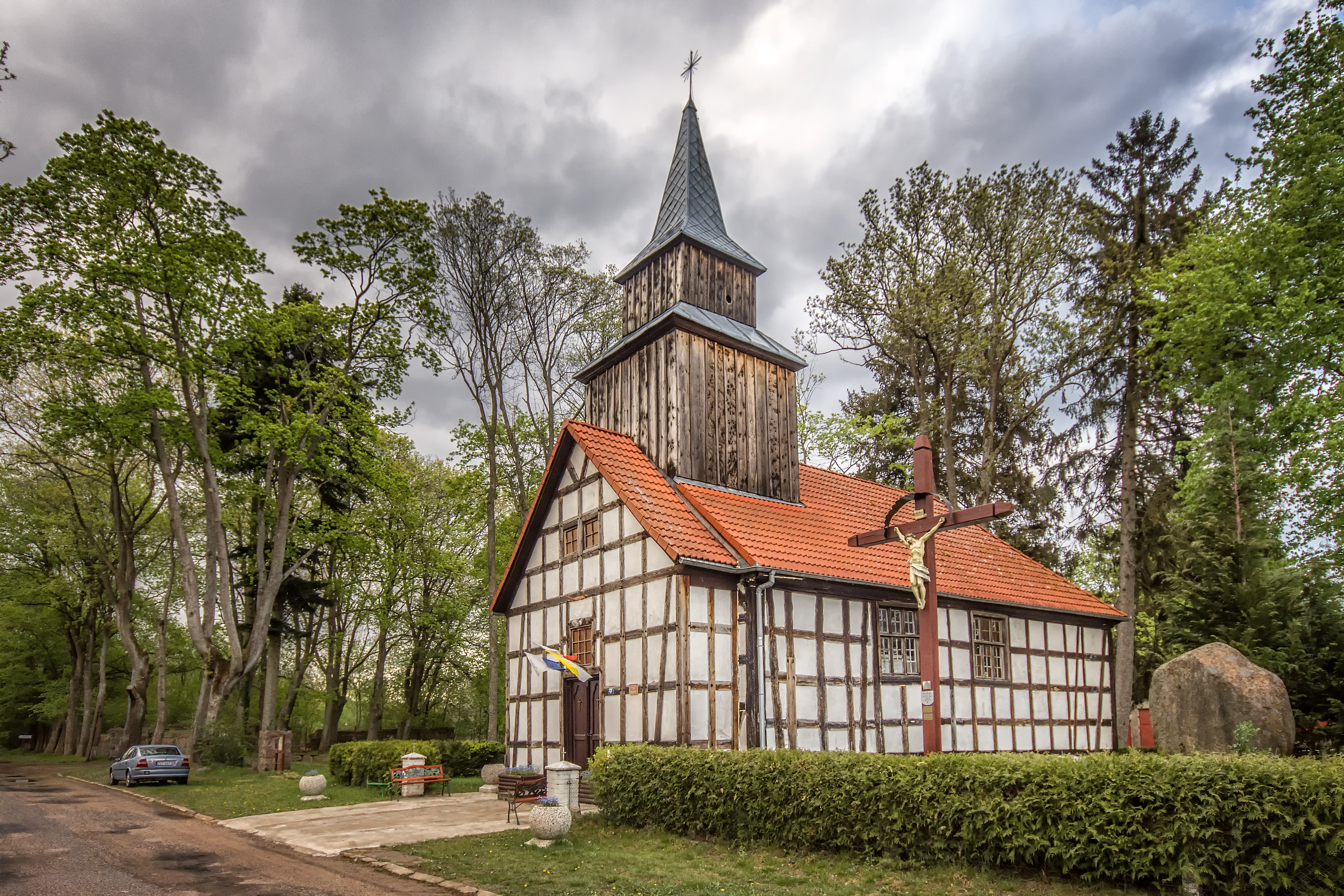
- Saint Stanislaus Kostka church in Iglice

- Location within Poland
- Coordinates: 53°49′N 15°28′E
- Country: Poland
- Voivodeship: West Pomeranian
- County: Łobez
- Gmina: Resko
- Time zone: UTC+1 (CET)
  - Summer (DST): UTC+2 (CEST)
- Vehicle registration: ZLO

Iglice [iˈɡlit͡sɛ] is a village in the administrative district of Gmina Resko, within Łobez County, West Pomeranian Voivodeship, in north-western Poland. It lies approximately 5 km (3 mi) north-east of Resko, 23 km (14 mi) north-west of Łobez, and 74 km (46 mi) north-east of the regional capital Szczecin.

It is located in the historic region of Pomerania.
