= Winniki, West Pomeranian Voivodeship =

Winniki
- Village
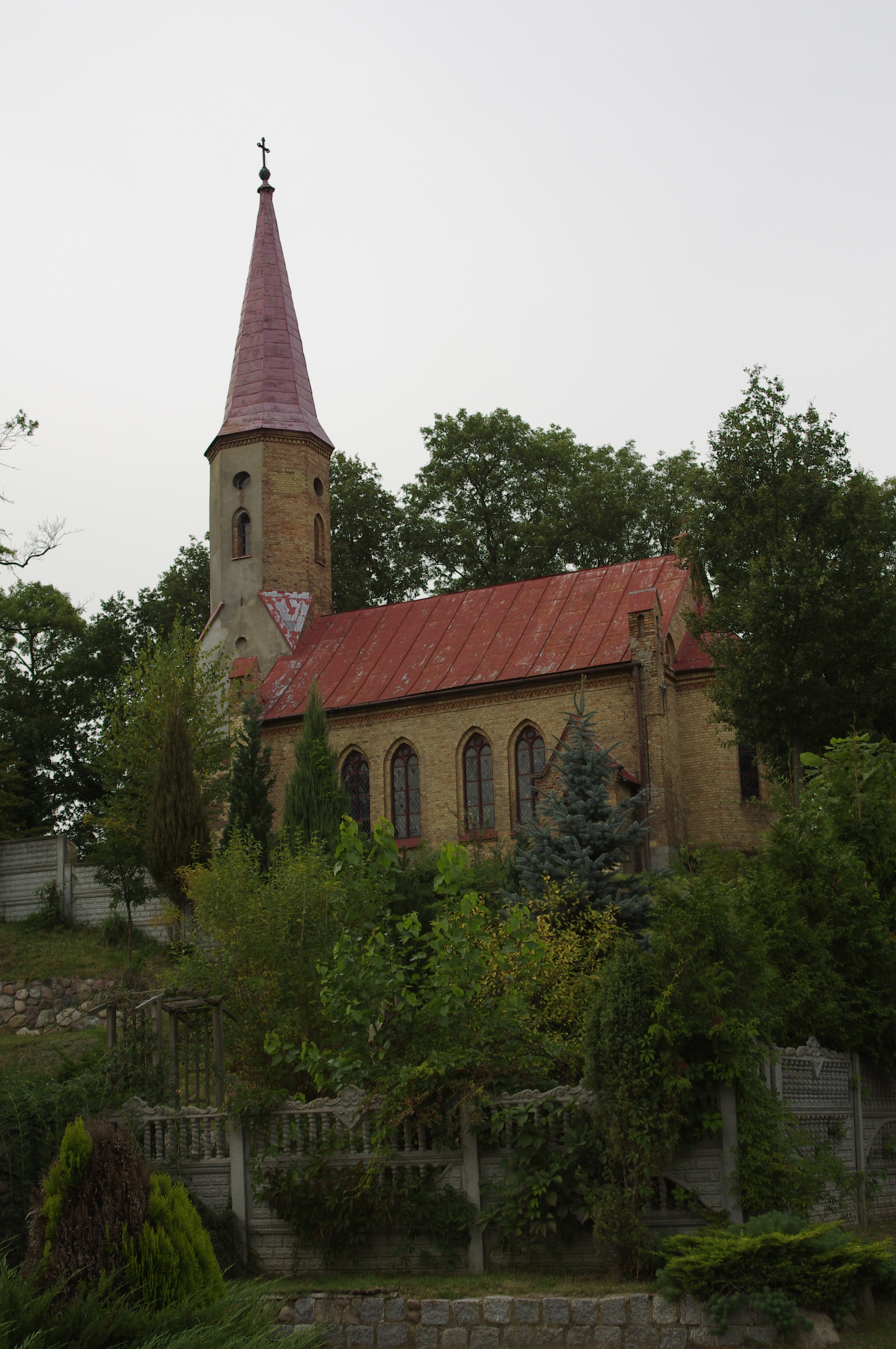
- Church in Winniki

- Location within Poland
- Coordinates: 53°31′N 15°29′E
- Country: Poland
- Voivodeship: West Pomeranian
- County: Łobez
- Gmina: Węgorzyno

Winniki [viɲˈɲiki] (German: Winningen) is a village in the administrative district of Gmina Węgorzyno, within Łobez County, West Pomeranian Voivodeship, in north-western Poland. It lies approximately 6 km (4 mi) south-west of Węgorzyno, 16 km (10 mi) south-west of Łobez, and 61 km (38 mi) east of the regional capital Szczecin.
