= Runowo, West Pomeranian Voivodeship =

Runowo
- Village
- Location within Poland
- Coordinates: 53°33′N 15°31′E
- Country: Poland
- Voivodeship: West Pomeranian
- County: Łobez
- Gmina: Węgorzyno

Runowo [ruˈnɔvɔ] (German: Ruhnow) is a village in the administrative district of Gmina Węgorzyno, within Łobez County, West Pomeranian Voivodeship, in north-western Poland. It lies approximately 4 km (2 mi) west of Węgorzyno, 12 km (7 mi) south-west of Łobez, and 64 km (40 mi) east of the regional capital Szczecin.
