= Słowikowo, West Pomeranian Voivodeship =

Słowikowo
- Settlement
- Location within Poland
- Coordinates: 53°47′57″N 15°23′22″E
- Country: Poland
- Voivodeship: West Pomeranian
- County: Łobez
- Gmina: Resko

Słowikowo [swɔviˈkɔvɔ] (German: Johannisthal) is a settlement in the administrative district of Gmina Resko, within Łobez County, West Pomeranian Voivodeship, in north-western Poland. It lies approximately 1 km (1 mi) west of Resko, 24 km (15 mi) north-west of Łobez, and 69 km (43 mi) north-east of the regional capital Szczecin.

In 1945, Germany was defeated in World War II and lost the territory. For the history of the region, see History of Pomerania.
