= Kraśnik Łobeski =

- Village
- Location within Poland
- Coordinates: 53°34′53″N 15°32′29″E
- Country: Poland
- Voivodeship: West Pomeranian
- County: Łobez
- Gmina: Węgorzyno

Kraśnik Łobeski [ˈkraɕnik wɔˈbɛski] is a village in the administrative district of Gmina Węgorzyno, within Łobez County, West Pomeranian Voivodeship, in north-western Poland. It lies approximately 4 km (2 mi) north-west of Węgorzyno, 10 km (6 mi) south-west of Łobez, and 66 km (41 mi) east of the regional capital Szczecin.
