= Prusim, West Pomeranian Voivodeship =

Prusim
- Settlement
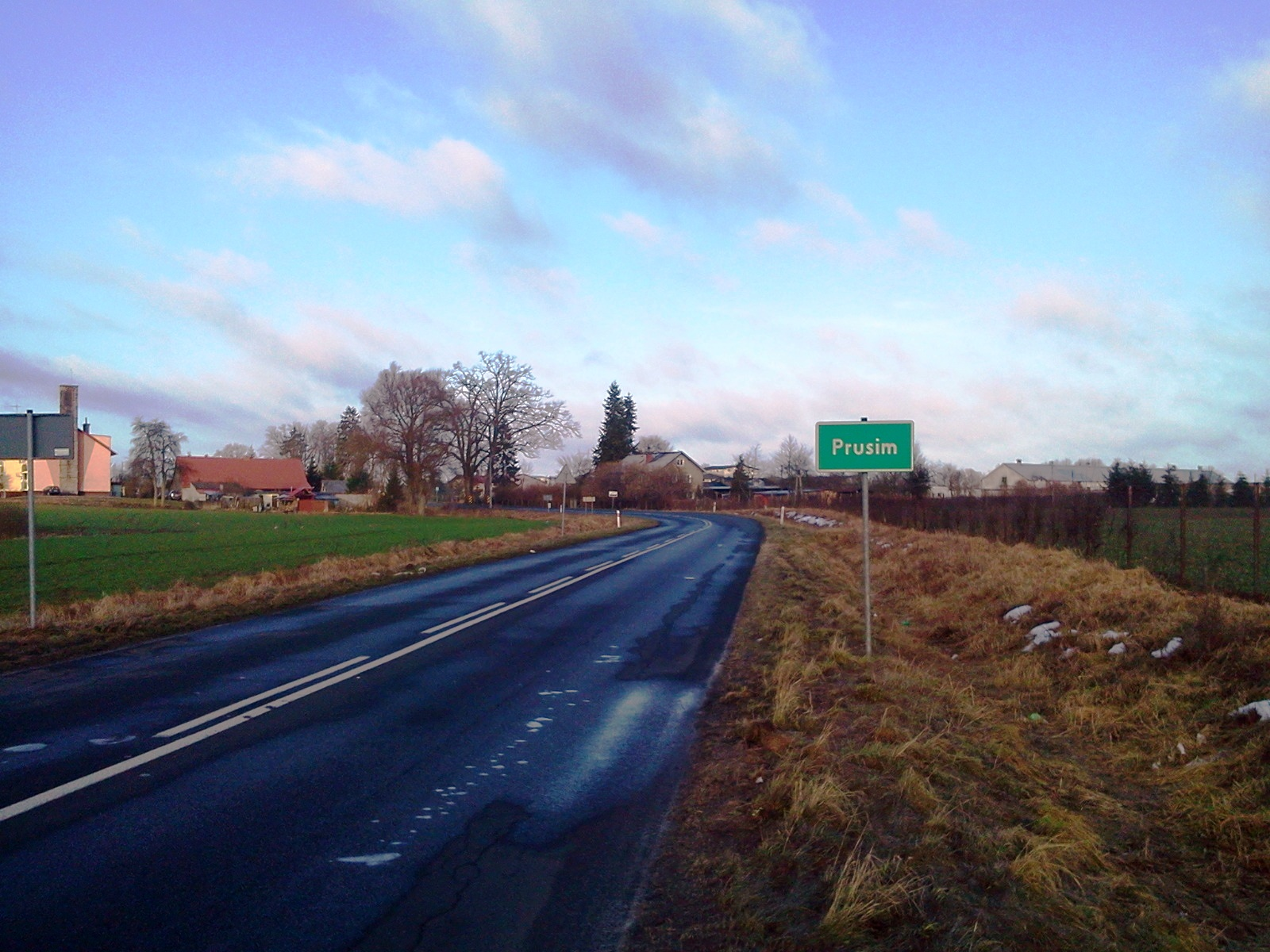
- Prusim

- Location within Poland
- Coordinates: 53°46′35″N 15°25′47″E
- Country: Poland
- Voivodeship: West Pomeranian
- County: Łobez
- Gmina: Resko
- Vehicle registration: ZLO

Prusim [ˈpruɕim] is a settlement in the administrative district of Gmina Resko, within Łobez County, West Pomeranian Voivodeship, in north-western Poland. It lies approximately 4 km (2 mi) south-east of Resko, 21 km (13 mi) north-west of Łobez, and 69 km (43 mi) north-east of the regional capital Szczecin.

== History ==
The territory became part of the emerging Polish state under its first ruler Mieszko I around 967. Following the fragmentation of Poland, it was part of the Duchy of Pomerania.

During World War II, the Germans operated a forced labour subcamp of the prison in Goleniów in the village.
