= Komorowo, Łobez County =

Komorowo
- Settlement
- Location within Poland
- Coordinates: 53°49′27″N 15°22′21″E
- Country: Poland
- Voivodeship: West Pomeranian
- County: Łobez
- Gmina: Resko

Komorowo [kɔmɔˈrɔvɔ] (German: Kummerow) is a settlement in the administrative district of Gmina Resko, within Łobez County, West Pomeranian Voivodeship, in north-western Poland. It lies approximately 4 km (2 mi) north-west of Resko, 27 km (17 mi) north-west of Łobez, and 69 km (43 mi) north-east of the regional capital Szczecin.

For the history of the region, see History of Pomerania.
