= Chwarstno =

- Village
- Location within Poland
- Coordinates: 53°32′N 15°27′E
- Country: Poland
- Voivodeship: West Pomeranian
- County: Łobez
- Gmina: Węgorzyno

Chwarstno (Polish pronunciation: [ˈxfarstnɔ]; German: Horst) is a village in the administrative district of Gmina Węgorzyno, within Łobez County, West Pomeranian Voivodeship, in north-western Poland. It lies is approximately 8 km (5 mi) west of Węgorzyno, 16 km (10 mi) south-west of Łobez, and 59 km (37 mi) east of the regional capital Szczecin.
