= Podlipce =

- Village
- Location within Poland
- Coordinates: 53°30′N 15°32′E
- Country: Poland
- Voivodeship: West Pomeranian
- County: Łobez
- Gmina: Węgorzyno

Podlipce [pɔdˈlipt͡sɛ] (German: Piepstock) is a village in the administrative district of Gmina Węgorzyno, within Łobez County, West Pomeranian Voivodeship, in north-western Poland. It lies approximately 5 km (3 mi) south-west of Węgorzyno, 16 km (10 mi) south of Łobez, and 64 km (40 mi) east of the regional capital Szczecin.
