= Stara Dobrzyca =

- Village
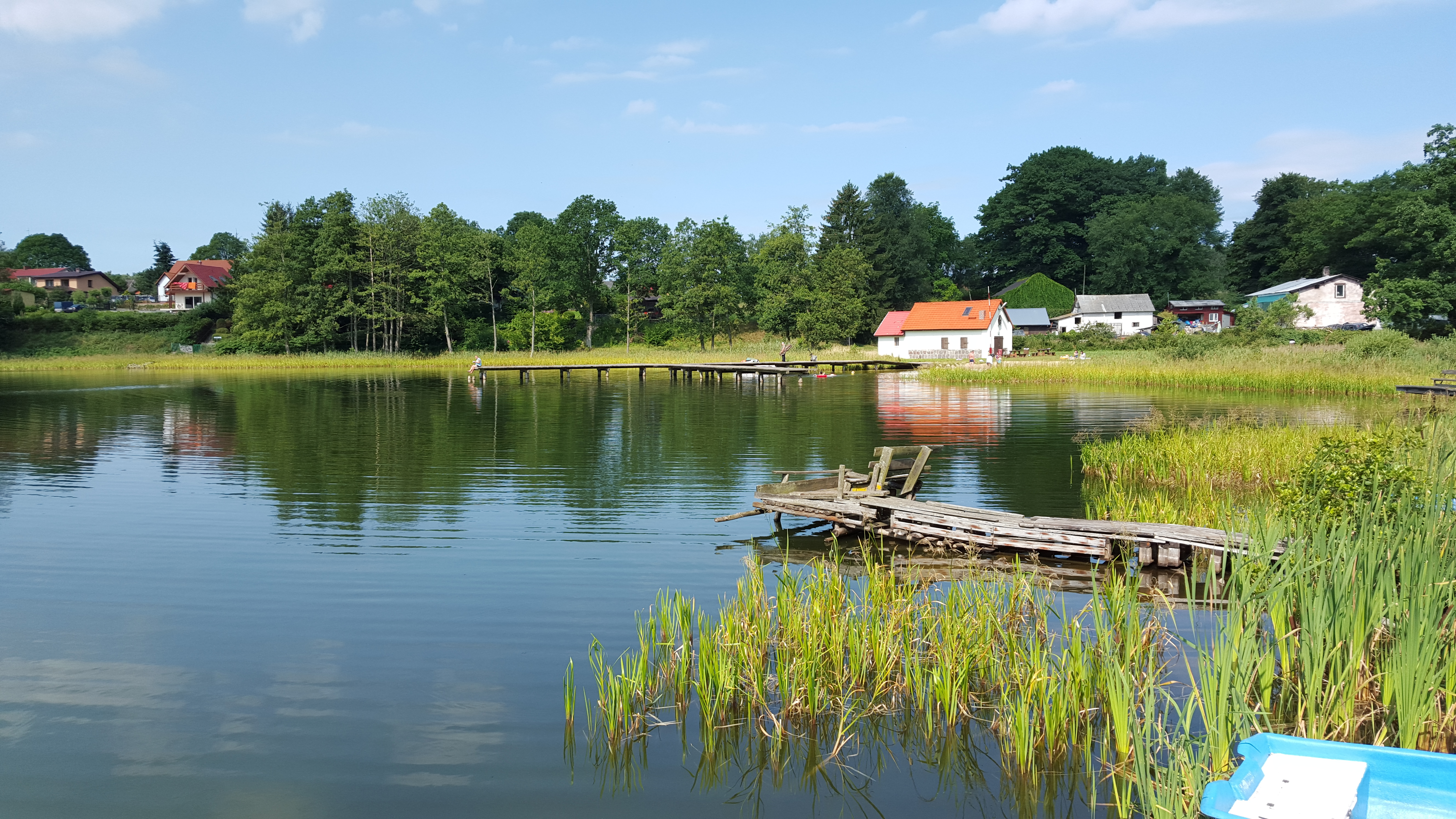

- Location within Poland
- Coordinates: 53°49′6″N 15°32′0″E
- Country: Poland
- Voivodeship: West Pomeranian
- County: Łobez
- Gmina: Resko
- Time zone: UTC+1 (CET)
  - Summer (DST): UTC+2 (CEST)
- Vehicle registration: ZLO

Stara Dobrzyca (Polish pronunciation: [ˈstara dɔˈbʐɨt͡sa]) is a village in the administrative district of Gmina Resko, within Łobez County, West Pomeranian Voivodeship, in north-western Poland. It lies approximately 9 km (6 mi) east of Resko, 22 km (14 mi) north of Łobez, and 77 km (48 mi) north-east of the regional capital Szczecin.

It is situated on the northern shore of Dobrzyca Lake in the historic region of History of Pomerania.
