= Łagiewniki, West Pomeranian Voivodeship =

Łagiewniki
- Settlement
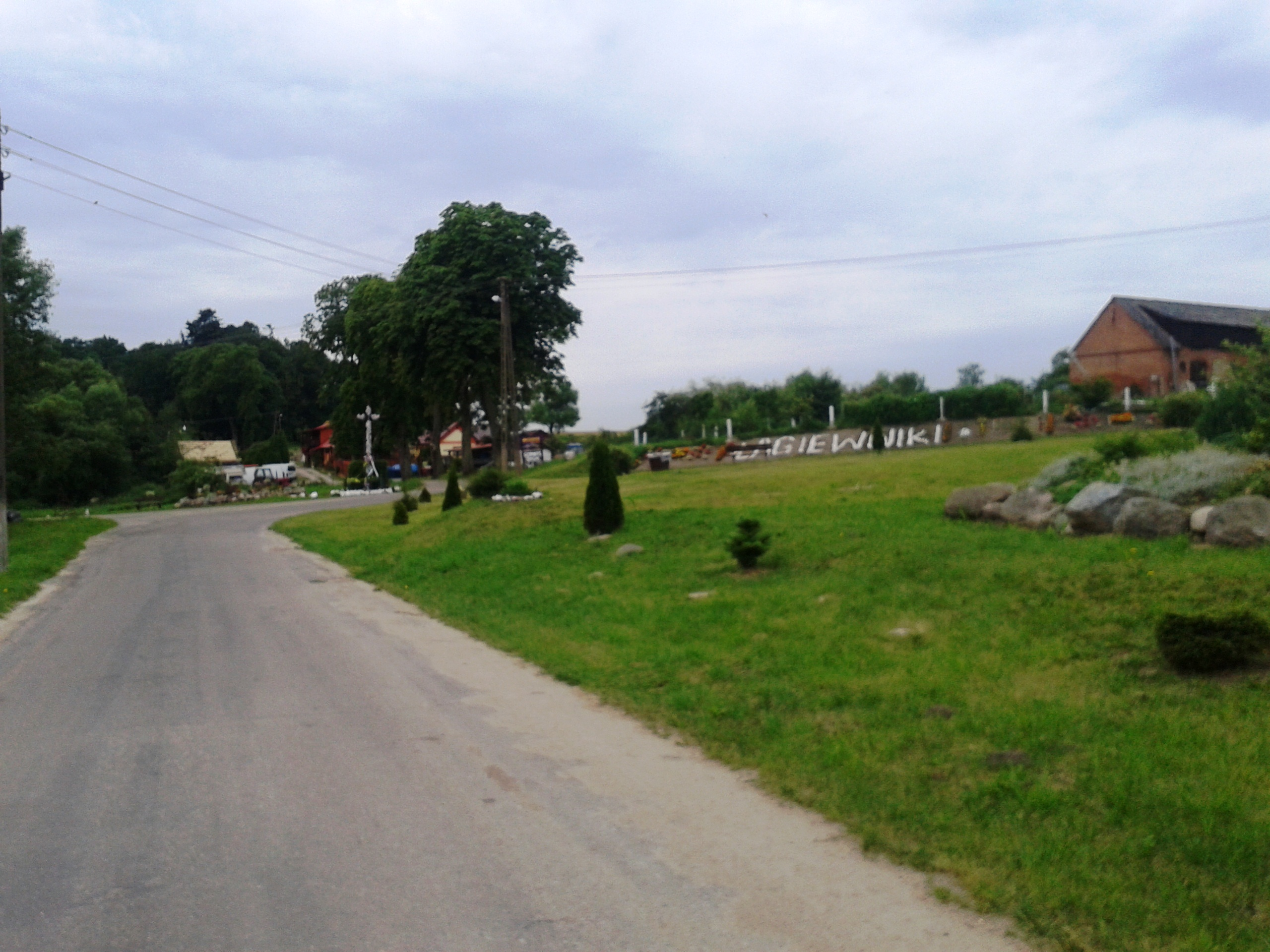
- Łagiewniki- gmina Resko

- Location within Poland
- Coordinates: 53°44′36″N 15°29′43″E
- Country: Poland
- Voivodeship: West Pomeranian
- County: Łobez
- Gmina: Resko
- Population: 160

Łagiewniki (Polish pronunciation: [waɡʲɛvˈniki]; German: Elvershagen) is a settlement in the administrative district of Gmina Resko, within Łobez County, West Pomeranian Voivodeship, in north-western Poland. It lies approximately 9 km (6 mi) south-east of Resko, 15 km (9 mi) north-west of Łobez, and 71 km (44 mi) north-east of the regional capital Szczecin.

For the history of the region, see History of Pomerania.

The settlement has a population of 160.
