= Godziszewo, West Pomeranian Voivodeship =

Godziszewo
- Village
- Location within Poland
- Coordinates: 53°44′43″N 15°17′59″E
- Country: Poland
- Voivodeship: West Pomeranian
- County: Łobez
- Gmina: Resko

Godziszewo [ɡɔd͡ʑiˈʂɛvɔ] (German: Friederickenwalde) is a village in the administrative district of Gmina Resko, within Łobez County, West Pomeranian Voivodeship, in north-western Poland. It lies approximately 9 km (6 mi) south-west of Resko, 25 km (16 mi) north-west of Łobez, and 60 km (37 mi) north-east of the regional capital Szczecin.

For the history of the region, see History of Pomerania.
