= Mieszewo =

- Village
- Location within Poland
- Coordinates: 53°35′N 15°23′E
- Country: Poland
- Voivodeship: West Pomeranian
- County: Łobez
- Gmina: Węgorzyno

Mieszewo [mjɛˈʂɛvɔ] (German: Meesow) is a Polish village in the administrative district of Gmina Węgorzyno, within Łobez County, West Pomeranian Voivodeship, in north-western Poland. It lies approximately 13 km (8 mi) north-west of Węgorzyno, 17 km (11 mi) west of Łobez, and 57 km (35 mi) east of the regional capital Szczecin.

== People ==
- Johann Georg von Dewitz (1878-1958), German politician (German National People's Party)
