= Cieszyno, Łobez County =

Cieszyno
- Village
- Location within Poland
- Coordinates: 53°31′N 15°27′E
- Country: Poland
- Voivodeship: West Pomeranian
- County: Łobez
- Gmina: Węgorzyno

Cieszyno [t͡ɕɛˈʂɨnɔ] (German: Teschendorf) is a village in the administrative district of Gmina Węgorzyno, within Łobez County, West Pomeranian Voivodeship, in north-western Poland. It lies approximately 8 km (5 mi) west of Węgorzyno, 17 km (11 mi) south-west of Łobez, and 59 km (37 mi) east of the regional capital Szczecin.

== See also ==
- History of Pomerania
