= Bezmoście =

- Settlement
- Location within Poland
- Coordinates: 53°45′33″N 15°28′38″E
- Country: Poland
- Voivodeship: West Pomeranian
- County: Łobez
- Gmina: Resko
- Population: 8

Bezmoście [bɛzˈmɔɕt͡ɕɛ] (formerly German Ottoburg) is a settlement in the administrative district of Gmina Resko, within Łobez County, West Pomeranian Voivodeship, in north-western Poland. It lies approximately 7 km (4 mi) south-east of Resko, 17 km (11 mi) north-west of Łobez, and 71 km (44 mi) north-east of the regional capital Szczecin.

For the history of the region, see History of Pomerania.

The settlement has a population of 8.
