= Orzeszkowo, West Pomeranian Voivodeship =

Orzeszkowo
- Village
- Location within Poland
- Coordinates: 53°51′23″N 15°31′3″E
- Country: Poland
- Voivodeship: West Pomeranian
- County: Łobez
- Gmina: Resko
- Population: 30

Orzeszkowo [ɔʐɛʂˈkɔvɔ] (German: Neuhof) is a village in the administrative district of Gmina Resko, within Łobez County, West Pomeranian Voivodeship, in north-western Poland. It lies approximately 10 km (6 mi) north-east of Resko, 26 km (16 mi) north of Łobez, and 79 km (49 mi) north-east of the regional capital Szczecin.

For the history of the region, see History of Pomerania.

The village has a population of 30.

Orzeszkowo-type cemeteries are a distinctive form of early medieval necropolis, characterized by quadrilateral barrows, most often square in shape. The term derives from the site at Orzeszkowo, excavated between 1921 and 1924. Such barrows occur exclusively in Pomerania and are distinguished by an earthen mound enclosed by a stone setting, within which various stone constructions, such as burial chambers or pavements, are found. They typically contain the burials of several individuals. Orzeszkowo-type cemeteries are biritual in character: alongside predominant inhumations, cremation graves also occur. Grave goods are usually modest. Although these sites belong to the most intriguing categories of early medieval funerary monuments, they have not been extensively studied in recent decades. An exception is the cemetery at Nowy Chorów in Słupsk County, Kępice Commune.
