= Krosino, Łobez County =

Krosino
- Settlement
- Location within Poland
- Coordinates: 53°45′29″N 15°34′48″E
- Country: Poland
- Voivodeship: West Pomeranian
- County: Łobez
- Gmina: Resko
- Population: 40

Krosino (Polish pronunciation: [krɔˈɕinɔ]; formerly German: Krössin) is a settlement in the administrative district of Gmina Resko, within Łobez County, West Pomeranian Voivodeship, in north-western Poland. It lies approximately 13 km (8 mi) east of Resko, 15 km (9 mi) north of Łobez, and 76 km (47 mi) north-east of the regional capital Szczecin.

For the history of the region, see History of Pomerania.

The settlement has a population of 40.
