= Trzaski, Łobez County =

Trzaski
- Village
- Location within Poland
- Coordinates: 53°46′24″N 15°21′48″E
- Country: Poland
- Voivodeship: West Pomeranian
- County: Łobez
- Gmina: Resko

Trzaski [ˈtʂaski] (German: Seehof) is a village in the administrative district of Gmina Resko, within Łobez County, West Pomeranian Voivodeship, in north-western Poland. It lies approximately 4 km (2 mi) south-west of Resko, 23 km (14 mi) north-west of Łobez, and 65 km (40 mi) north-east of the regional capital Szczecin.

For the history of the region, see History of Pomerania.
