= Potuliny =

- Settlement
- Location within Poland
- Coordinates: 53°48′13″N 15°28′1″E
- Country: Poland
- Voivodeship: West Pomeranian
- County: Łobez
- Gmina: Resko

Potuliny [pɔtuˈlinɨ] (German: Flackenhagen) is a settlement in the administrative district of Gmina Resko, within Łobez County, West Pomeranian Voivodeship, in north-western Poland. It lies approximately 5 km (3 mi) east of Resko, 22 km (14 mi) north-west of Łobez, and 73 km (45 mi) north-east of the regional capital Szczecin.

For the history of the region, see History of Pomerania.
