= Lubień Dolny =

- Village
- Location within Poland
- Coordinates: 53°45′19″N 15°26′51″E
- Country: Poland
- Voivodeship: West Pomeranian
- County: Łobez
- Gmina: Resko

Lubień Dolny (Polish pronunciation: [ˈlubjɛj̃ ˈdɔlnɨ]; German: Niederhagen) is a village in the administrative district of Gmina Resko, within Łobez County, West Pomeranian Voivodeship, in north-western Poland. It lies approximately 6 km (4 mi) south-east of Resko, 18 km (11 mi) north-west of Łobez, and 69 km (43 mi) north-east of the regional capital Szczecin.

For the history of the region, see History of Pomerania.
