= Przytoń, Łobez County =

Przytoń
- Village
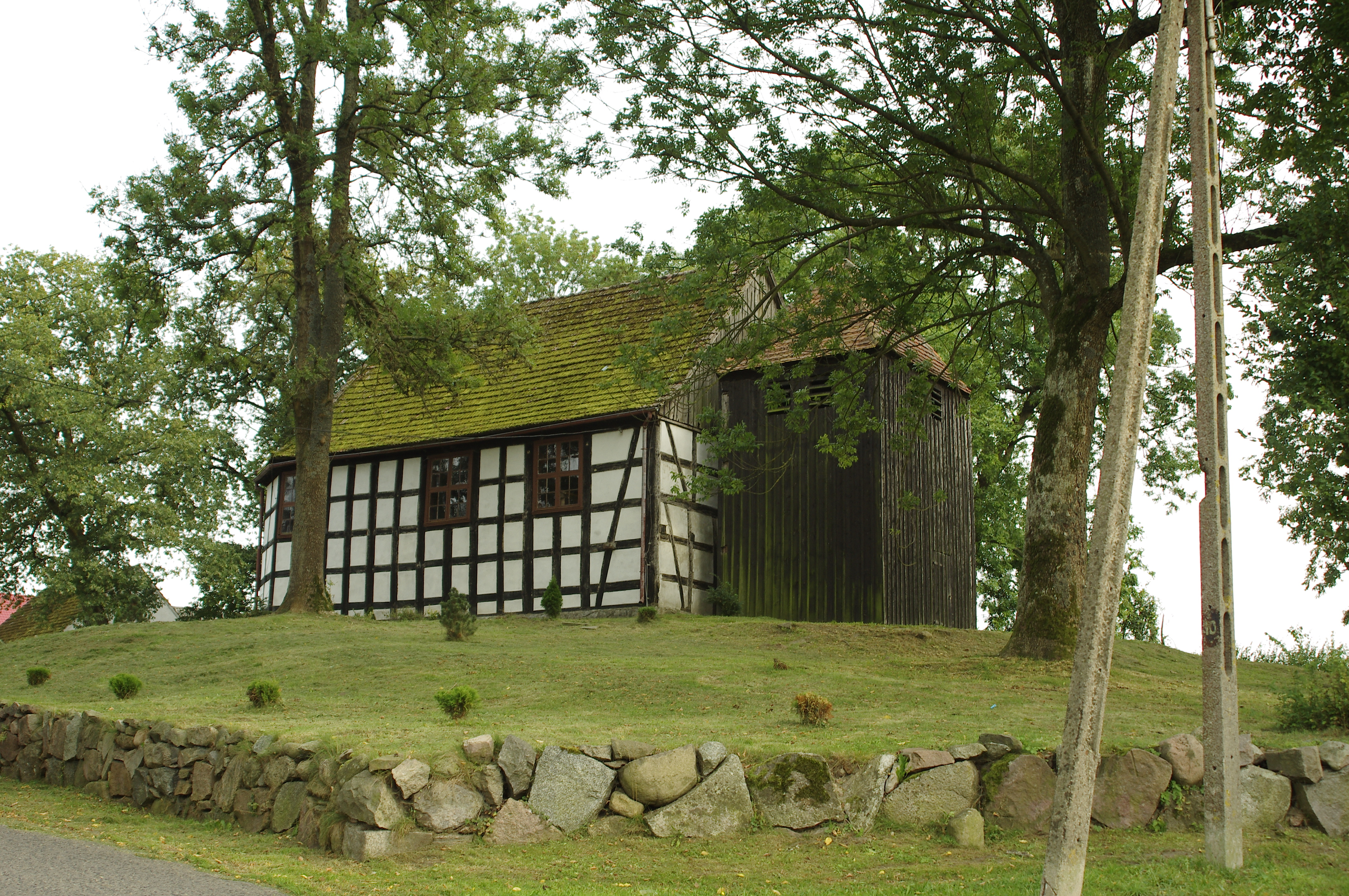
- Church in Przytoń

- Location within Poland
- Coordinates: 53°32′N 15°36′E
- Country: Poland
- Voivodeship: West Pomeranian
- County: Łobez
- Gmina: Węgorzyno
- Time zone: UTC+1 (CET)
  - Summer (DST): UTC+2 (CEST)
- Vehicle registration: ZLO

Przytoń [ˈpʂɨtɔɲ] (German: Klaushagen) is a village in the administrative district of Gmina Węgorzyno, within Łobez County, West Pomeranian Voivodeship, in north-western Poland. It lies approximately 3 km (2 mi) east of Węgorzyno, 12 km (7 mi) south of Łobez, and 69 km (43 mi) east of the regional capital Szczecin.

== History ==
During World War II, on 2 February 1945, the village was the site of a stopover during the German-organised march of some 6,000 Polish prisoners of war from the Oflag II-D camp headed westwards.
