= Mołstowo, Łobez County =

Mołstowo
- Settlement
- Location within Poland
- Coordinates: 53°46′36″N 15°33′38″E
- Country: Poland
- Voivodeship: West Pomeranian
- County: Łobez
- Gmina: Resko

Mołstowo (Polish pronunciation: [mɔu̯sˈtɔvɔ]; formerly German: Molstow) is a settlement in the administrative district of Gmina Resko, within Łobez County, West Pomeranian Voivodeship, in north-western Poland. It lies approximately 11 km (7 mi) east of Resko, 17 km (11 mi) north of Łobez, and 76 km (47 mi) north-east of the regional capital Szczecin.

For the history of the region, see History of Pomerania.
