= Lesięcin =

- Village
- Location within Poland
- Coordinates: 53°35′N 15°34′E
- Country: Poland
- Voivodeship: West Pomeranian
- County: Łobez
- Gmina: Węgorzyno

Lesięcin [lɛˈɕɛnt͡ɕin] (German: Lessenthin) is a village in the administrative district of Gmina Węgorzyno, within Łobez County, West Pomeranian Voivodeship, in north-western Poland. It lies approximately 5 km (3 mi) north of Węgorzyno, 7 km (4 mi) south-west of Łobez, and 68 km (42 mi) east of the regional capital Szczecin.
