= Sosnówko =

- Village
- Location within Poland
- Coordinates: 53°47′5″N 15°30′58″E
- Country: Poland
- Voivodeship: West Pomeranian
- County: Łobez
- Gmina: Resko

Sosnówko (Polish pronunciation: [sɔsˈnufkɔ]; formerly German: Neu Zozenow) is a village in the administrative district of Gmina Resko, within Łobez County, West Pomeranian Voivodeship, in north-western Poland. It lies approximately 8 km (5 mi) east of Resko, 19 km (12 mi) north of Łobez, and 74 km (46 mi) north-east of the regional capital Szczecin.

For the history of the region, see History of Pomerania.
