= Sarnikierz =

- Village
- Location within Poland
- Coordinates: 53°28′N 15°31′E
- Country: Poland
- Voivodeship: West Pomeranian
- County: Łobez
- Gmina: Węgorzyno
- Population: 33

Sarnikierz [sarˈnikʲɛʂ] (German: Dorotheenthal) is a village in the administrative district of Gmina Węgorzyno, within Łobez County, West Pomeranian Voivodeship, in north-western Poland. It lies approximately 9 km (6 mi) south of Węgorzyno, 20 km (12 mi) south of Łobez, and 63 km (39 mi) east of the regional capital Szczecin.

The village has a population of 33.
