= Taczały =

- Village
- Location within Poland
- Coordinates: 53°44′45″N 15°16′20″E
- Country: Poland
- Voivodeship: West Pomeranian
- County: Łobez
- Gmina: Resko

Taczały [taˈt͡ʂawɨ] (German: Ludwigshorst) is a village in the administrative district of Gmina Resko, within Łobez County, West Pomeranian Voivodeship, in north-western Poland. It lies approximately 11 km (7 mi) south-west of Resko, 26 km (16 mi) north-west of Łobez, and 59 km (37 mi) north-east of the regional capital Szczecin.

For the history of the region, see History of Pomerania.
