= Siwkowice =

- Village
- Location within Poland
- Coordinates: 53°44′6″N 15°15′2″E
- Country: Poland
- Voivodeship: West Pomeranian
- County: Łobez
- Gmina: Resko

Siwkowice [ɕifkɔˈvit͡sɛ] (German: Schmelzdorf) is a village in the administrative district of Gmina Resko, within Łobez County, West Pomeranian Voivodeship, in north-western Poland. It lies approximately 13 km (8 mi) south-west of Resko, 27 km (17 mi) north-west of Łobez, and 57 km (35 mi) north-east of the regional capital Szczecin.

For the history of the region, see History of Pomerania.
