= Łabuń Wielki =

- Village
- Location within Poland
- Coordinates: 53°48′40″N 15°25′27″E
- Country: Poland
- Voivodeship: West Pomeranian
- County: Łobez
- Gmina: Resko

Łabuń Wielki (Polish pronunciation: [ˈwabuj̃ ˈvjɛlkʲi]; German: Labuhn) is a village in the administrative district of Gmina Resko, within Łobez County, West Pomeranian Voivodeship, in north-western Poland. It lies approximately 3 km (2 mi) north-east of Resko, 24 km (15 mi) north-west of Łobez, and 71 km (44 mi) north-east of the regional capital Szczecin.

For the history of the region, see History of Pomerania.
