= Naćmierz, Łobez County =

Naćmierz
- Settlement
- Location within Poland
- Coordinates: 53°43′52″N 15°36′12″E
- Country: Poland
- Voivodeship: West Pomeranian
- County: Łobez
- Gmina: Resko
- Population (2022): 64
- ZIP Code: 73-153
- Area code: 91

Naćmierz [ˈnat͡ɕmjɛʂ] (German: Natzmersdorf) is a settlement in the administrative district of Gmina Resko, within Łobez County, West Pomeranian Voivodeship, in north-western Poland.

As of 2022, the village has a population of 64.

== History ==
The village of Naćmierz (lit. 'stonehead') was originally a fief of the von Borcke family, a house of Pomeranian nobility. In 1496 Henry von Meseritz purchased the land from Hans von Borcke, and later passed through other noble families until the turn of the 19th century, when the property was owned by the von Brockhusen family (see: Brockhusen (noble family)), and managed by Anton Bogislav von Brockhusen. The land was finally held by the Holtz family until 1945, succeeded by the establishment of the People's Republic of Poland.

Originally titled Nacmierz, the name was changed to Naćmierz in 2007.

The settlement is currently home to Naćmierz Manor, which was built in the 18th century by the von Borcke family. It was rebuilt in the 19th century following damage to the building.

== Geography ==
Naćmierz lies approximately 16 km (10 mi) south-east of Resko, 11 km (7 mi) north of Łobez, and 76 km (47 mi) north-east of the regional capital Szczecin. It is bordered to the west by the village of Przemysław, and to the east by Klępnica.

The village is under the jurisdiction of the Łoba District Police.

== See also ==
- History of Pomerania
