= Żerzyno =

- Settlement
- Location within Poland
- Coordinates: 53°44′53″N 15°19′19″E
- Country: Poland
- Voivodeship: West Pomeranian
- County: Łobez
- Gmina: Resko

Żerzyno [ʐɛˈʐɨnɔ] (German: Ornshagen) is a settlement in the administrative district of Gmina Resko. It is situated within Łobez County, West Pomeranian Voivodeship, in north-western Poland. It lies approximately 8 km (5 mi) south-west of Resko, 24 km (15 mi) north-west of Łobez, and 62 km (39 mi) north-east of the regional capital Szczecin.

For the history of the region, see History of Pomerania.
