= Luboradz, West Pomeranian Voivodeship =

Luboradz
- Village
- Location within Poland
- Coordinates: 53°48′13″N 15°22′36″E
- Country: Poland
- Voivodeship: West Pomeranian
- County: Łobez
- Gmina: Resko

Luboradz [luˈbɔrat͡s] (German: Gramhof) is a village in the administrative district of Gmina Resko, within Łobez County, West Pomeranian Voivodeship, in north-western Poland. It lies approximately 2 km (1 mi) west of Resko, 25 km (16 mi) north-west of Łobez, and 68 km (42 mi) north-east of the regional capital Szczecin.

For the history of the region, see History of Pomerania.
