= Lubień Górny =

- Settlement
- Location within Poland
- Coordinates: 53°44′20″N 15°27′11″E
- Country: Poland
- Voivodeship: West Pomeranian
- County: Łobez
- Gmina: Resko

Lubień Górny (Polish pronunciation: [ˈlubjɛj̃ ˈɡurnɨ]; German: Obernhagen) is a settlement in the administrative district of Gmina Resko, within Łobez County, West Pomeranian Voivodeship, in north-western Poland. It lies approximately 8 km (5 mi) south-east of Resko, 16 km (10 mi) north-west of Łobez, and 68 km (42 mi) north-east of the regional capital Szczecin.

For the history of the region, see History of Pomerania.
