= Łosośnica =

- Village
- Location within Poland
- Coordinates: 53°42′17″N 15°16′22″E
- Country: Poland
- Voivodeship: West Pomeranian
- County: Łobez
- Gmina: Resko

Łosośnica [wɔsɔɕˈnit͡sa] (formerly German Lasbeck) is a village in the administrative district of Gmina Resko, within Łobez County, West Pomeranian Voivodeship, in north-western Poland. It lies approximately 14 km (8.7 mi) south-west of Resko, 25 km (16 mi) west of Łobez, and 56 km (35 mi) north-east of the regional capital Szczecin.

For the history of the region, see History of Pomerania.
