= Gozdno, West Pomeranian Voivodeship =

Gozdno
- Village
- Location within Poland
- Coordinates: 53°47′57″N 15°29′27″E
- Country: Poland
- Voivodeship: West Pomeranian
- County: Łobez
- Gmina: Resko

Gozdno [ˈɡɔzdnɔ] (German: Hägerfelde) is a village in the administrative district of Gmina Resko, within Łobez County, West Pomeranian Voivodeship, in north-western Poland. It lies approximately 6 km (4 mi) east of Resko, 21 km (13 mi) north-west of Łobez, and 74 km (46 mi) north-east of the regional capital Szczecin.

For the history of the region, see History of Pomerania.
