= Miłogoszcz, Łobez County =

Miłogoszcz
- Settlement
- Location within Poland
- Coordinates: 53°43′34″N 15°18′9″E
- Country: Poland
- Voivodeship: West Pomeranian
- County: Łobez
- Gmina: Resko

Miłogoszcz [miˈwɔɡɔʂt͡ʂ] (formerly German: Sophienhof) is a settlement in the administrative district of Gmina Resko, within Łobez County, West Pomeranian Voivodeship, in north-western Poland. It lies approximately 11 km (7 mi) south-west of Resko, 24 km (15 mi) north-west of Łobez, and 59 km (37 mi) north-east of the regional capital Szczecin.

For the history of the region, see History of Pomerania.
