= Smólsko, Łobez County =

Smólsko
- Settlement
- Location within Poland
- Coordinates: 53°45′45″N 15°23′39″E
- Country: Poland
- Voivodeship: West Pomeranian
- County: Łobez
- Gmina: Resko

Smólsko [ˈsmulskɔ] is a settlement in the administrative district of Gmina Resko, within Łobez County, West Pomeranian Voivodeship, in north-western Poland. It lies approximately 5 km (3 mi) south of Resko, 21 km (13 mi) north-west of Łobez, and 66 km (41 mi) north-east of the regional capital Szczecin.

For the history of the region, see History of Pomerania.
