= Mielno, Łobez County =

Mielno
- Village
- Location within Poland
- Coordinates: 53°34′2″N 15°24′55″E
- Country: Poland
- Voivodeship: West Pomeranian
- County: Łobez
- Gmina: Węgorzyno

Mielno [ˈmjɛlnɔ] (German: Mellen) is a village in the administrative district of Gmina Węgorzyno, within Łobez County, West Pomeranian Voivodeship, in north-western Poland. It lies approximately 11 km (7 mi) west of Węgorzyno, 16 km (10 mi) south-west of Łobez, and 58 km (36 mi) east of the regional capital Szczecin.
