= Sielsko =

- Village
- Location within Poland
- Coordinates: 53°35′N 15°28′E
- Country: Poland
- Voivodeship: West Pomeranian
- County: Łobez
- Gmina: Węgorzyno

Sielsko [ˈɕɛlskɔ] (German: Silligsdorf) is a village in the administrative district of Gmina Węgorzyno, within Łobez County, West Pomeranian Voivodeship, in north-western Poland. It lies approximately 9 km (6 mi) north-west of Węgorzyno, 12 km (7 mi) south-west of Łobez, and 62 km (39 mi) east of the regional capital Szczecin.
