= Nowe Węgorzynko =

Nowe Węgorzynko is a rural settlement in Gmina Węgorzyno, Łobez County, West Pomeranian Voivodeship, in north-western Poland.

It had two bus bays installed in 2017.

The village is the site of the pig sanctuary Gieniutkowo, established in 2021. The sanctuary houses 34 pigs in an area of one hectare. It is owned and operated by a graphic designer and an IT specialist, Monica and Marcin Krasoń. They are a couple, originally from Łódź, and both vegans. The pigs come from interventions against animal abuse or were donated voluntarily by owners unable to take care of them. One of the pigs has legs impaired by vertebral paralysis and uses wheels.
