= Porąbka, Łobez County =

Porąbka
- Settlement
- Location within Poland
- Coordinates: 53°49′50″N 15°24′12″E
- Country: Poland
- Voivodeship: West Pomeranian
- County: Łobez
- Gmina: Resko

Porąbka [pɔˈrɔmpka] (German: Rübenhagen) is a settlement in the administrative district of Gmina Resko, within Łobez County, West Pomeranian Voivodeship, in north-western Poland. It lies approximately 4 km (2 mi) north of Resko, 27 km (17 mi) north-west of Łobez, and 71 km (44 mi) north-east of the regional capital Szczecin.

For the history of the region, see History of Pomerania.
