= Policko, Łobez County =

Policko
- Village
- Location within Poland
- Coordinates: 53°47′27″N 15°22′55″E
- Country: Poland
- Voivodeship: West Pomeranian
- County: Łobez
- Gmina: Resko

Policko [pɔˈlit͡skɔ] (German: Stadtfeld) is a village in the administrative district of Gmina Resko, within Łobez County, West Pomeranian Voivodeship, in north-western Poland. It lies approximately 2 km (1 mi) south-west of Resko, 24 km (15 mi) north-west of Łobez, and 68 km (42 mi) north-east of the regional capital Szczecin.

For the history of the region, see History of Pomerania.
