= Smolsko =

Smolsko may refer to:

- Smolsko, Sofia Province, Bulgaria
- Smólsko, Łobez County, Poland
- Smólsko, Myślibórz County, Poland
