= Brzeźniak, West Pomeranian Voivodeship =

Brzeźniak
- Village
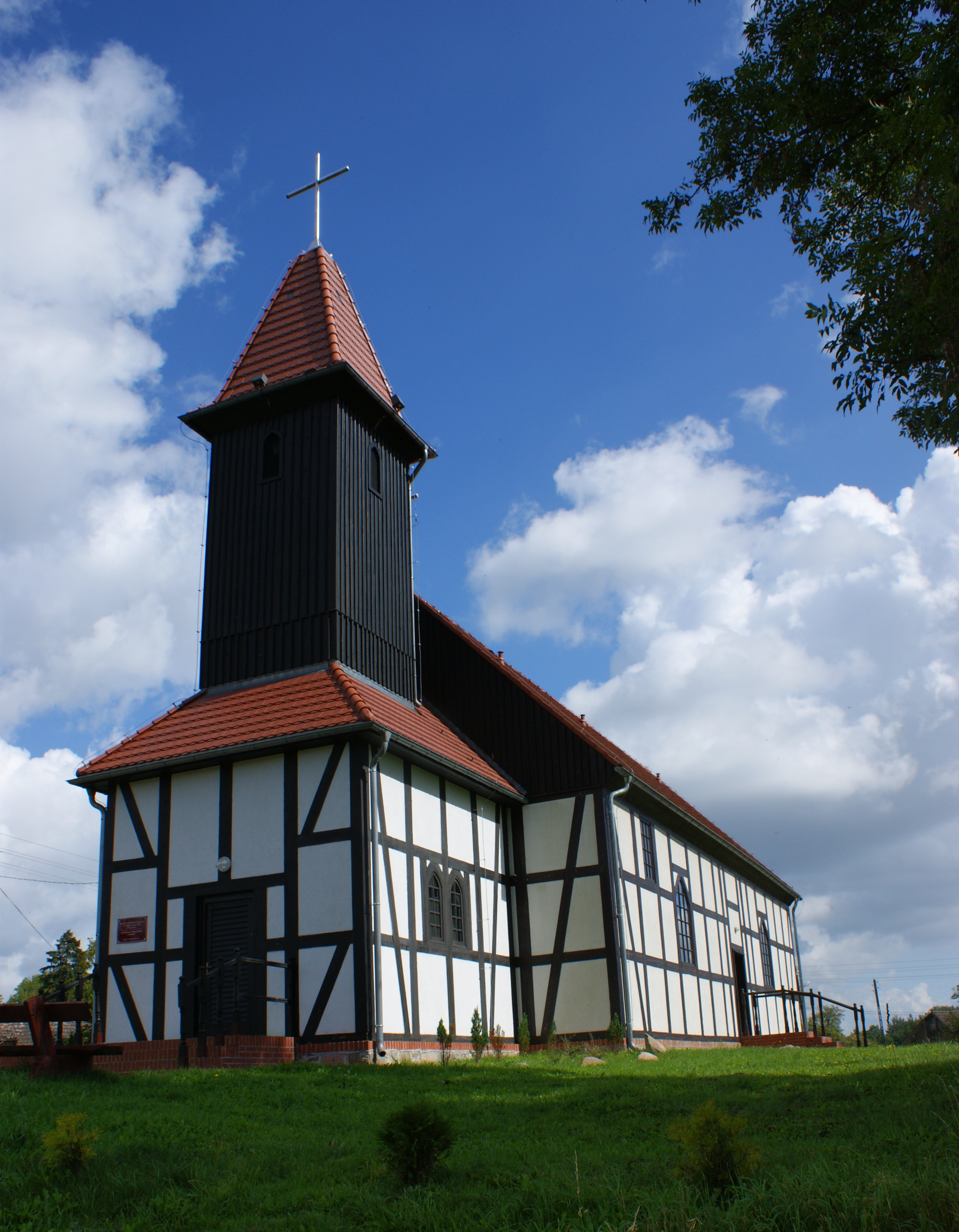
- Timber-framed church in Brzezniak

- Location within Poland
- Coordinates: 53°32′22″N 15°40′19″E
- Country: Poland
- Voivodeship: West Pomeranian
- County: Łobez
- Gmina: Węgorzyno

Brzeźniak [ˈbʐɛʑɲak] (German: Rosenfelde) is a village in the administrative district of Gmina Węgorzyno, within Łobez County, West Pomeranian Voivodeship, in north-western Poland.
