= Mokronos =

Mokronos may refer to the following places:

- Mokronos, Greater Poland Voivodeship (west-central Poland)
- Mokronos, Łobez County in West Pomeranian Voivodeship (north-west Poland)
- Mokronos, Pyrzyce County in West Pomeranian Voivodeship (north-west Poland)
