= Porąbka =

Porąbka may refer to the following places:

- Porąbka, Limanowa County in Lesser Poland Voivodeship (south Poland)
- Porąbka, Olkusz County in Lesser Poland Voivodeship (south Poland)
- Porąbka, Silesian Voivodeship (south Poland)
- Porąbka, Łobez County in West Pomeranian Voivodeship (north-west Poland)
- Porąbka, Świdwin County in West Pomeranian Voivodeship (north-west Poland)
