= Gozdno =

Gozdno may refer to the following places in Poland:

- Gozdno, Lower Silesian Voivodeship (south-west Poland)
- Gozdno, Lubusz Voivodeship (west Poland)
- Gozdno, West Pomeranian Voivodeship (north-west Poland)
