= Zwierzynek, West Pomeranian Voivodeship =

Zwierzynek
- Village
- Location within Poland
- Coordinates: 53°35′07.15″N 15°23′59.87″E
- Country: Poland
- Voivodeship: West Pomeranian
- County: Łobez
- Gmina: Węgorzyno

Zwierzynek [zvjɛˈʐɨnɛk] (German: Schwerin) is a village in the administrative district of Gmina Węgorzyno, within Łobez County, West Pomeranian Voivodeship, in north-western Poland.
