= Gmina Resko =

Gmina Resko Resko Commune
- Gmina
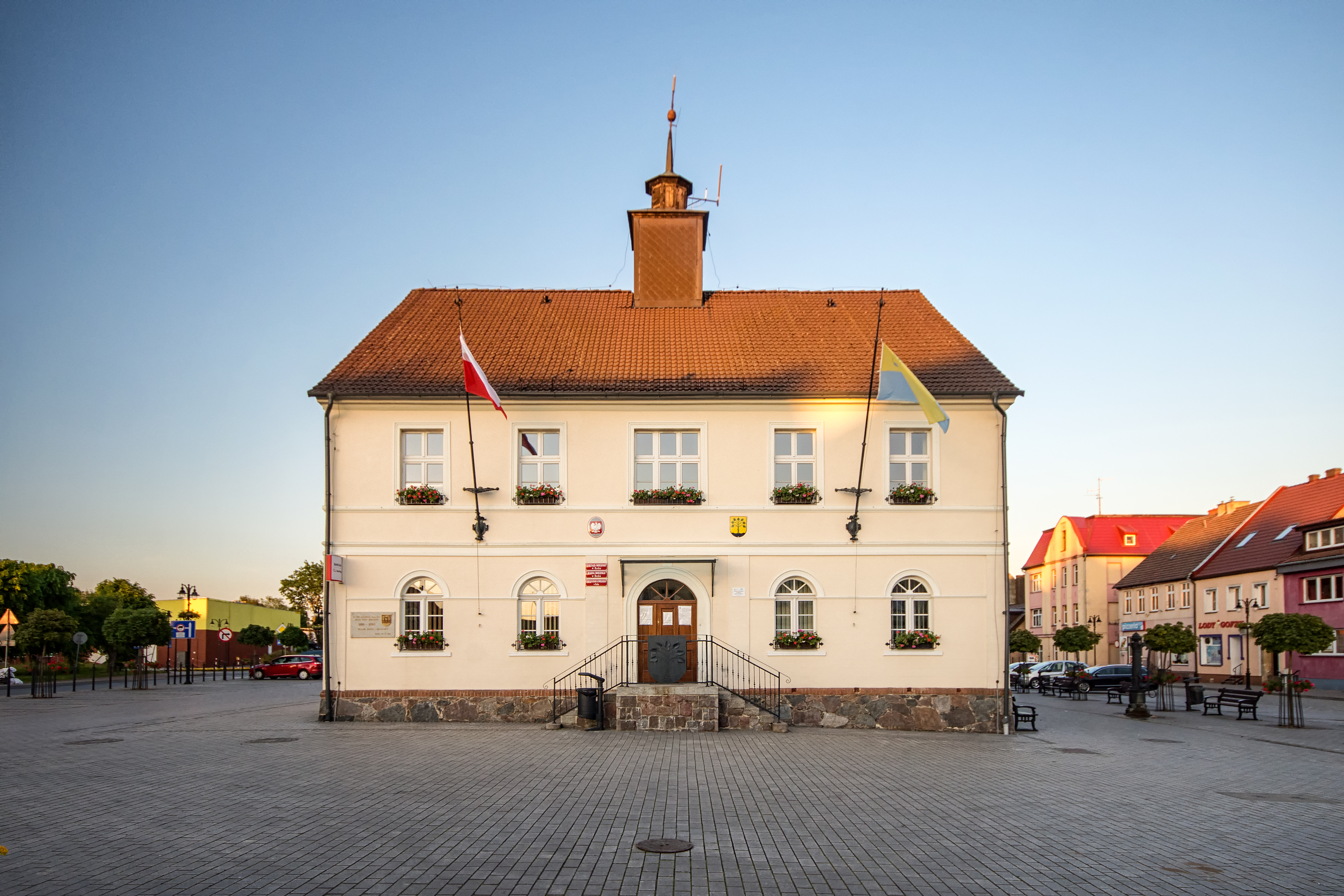
- Gmina office in Resko

- Flag Coat of arms
- Interactive map of Gmina Resko
- Coordinates (Resko): 53°48′N 15°24′E
- Country: Poland
- Voivodeship: West Pomeranian
- County: Łobez
- Seat: Resko

Area
  - Total: 285.24 km^{2} (110.13 sq mi)

Population (2006)
  - Total: 8,236
  - Density: 28.87/km^{2} (74.78/sq mi)
  - Urban: 4,377
  - Rural: 3,859
- Time zone: UTC+1 (CET)
  - Summer (DST): UTC+2 (CEST)
- Vehicle registration: ZLO
- Website: http://www.resko.pl/

Gmina Resko is an urban-rural gmina (administrative district) in Łobez County, West Pomeranian Voivodeship, in north-western Poland. Its seat is the town of Resko, which lies approximately 24 kilometres (15 mi) north-west of Łobez and 69 km (43 mi) north-east of the regional capital Szczecin.

The gmina covers an area of 285.24 square kilometres (110.1 sq mi), and as of 2006 its total population is 8,236 (out of which the population of Resko amounts to 4,377, and the population of the rural part of the gmina is 3,859).

== Villages ==
Apart from the town of Resko, Gmina Resko contains the villages and settlements of Bezmoście, Dorowo, Gardzin, Godziszewo, Gozdno, Iglice, Komorowo, Krosino, Łabuń Mały, Łabuń Wielki, Łagiewniki, Łosośnica, Łosośniczka, Lubień Dolny, Lubień Górny, Luboradz, Ługowina, Miłogoszcz, Mokronos, Mołstowo, Naćmierz, Orzeszkowo, Piaski, Policko, Porąbka, Potuliny, Prusim, Przemysław, Sąpólko, Sienno, Siwkowice, Słowikowo, Smólsko, Sosnówko, Sosnowo, Stara Dobrzyca, Stołążek, Święciechowo, Świekotki, Taczały, Trzaski and Żerzyno.

== Neighbouring gminas ==
Gmina Resko is bordered by the gminas of Łobez, Nowogard, Płoty, Radowo Małe, Rymań, Sławoborze and Świdwin.

== See also ==
- History of Pomerania
