= Sulice, Poland =

Sulice
- Village
- Location within Poland
- Coordinates: 53°31′47″N 15°35′54″E
- Country: Poland
- Voivodeship: West Pomeranian
- County: Łobez
- Gmina: Węgorzyno
- Time zone: UTC+01:00 (CET)
  - Summer (DST): UTC+02:00 (CEST)

Sulice [suˈlit͡sɛ] (German: Neu Gerdshagen) is a village in the administrative district of Gmina Węgorzyno, within Łobez County, West Pomeranian Voivodeship, in north-western Poland.
