= Miłogoszcz =

Miłogoszcz may refer to the following places in Poland:

- Miłogoszcz, Lower Silesian Voivodeship (south-west Poland)
- Miłogoszcz, Koszalin County in West Pomeranian Voivodeship (north-west Poland)
- Miłogoszcz, Łobez County in West Pomeranian Voivodeship (north-west Poland)
- Miłogoszcz, Wałcz County in West Pomeranian Voivodeship (north-west Poland)
