= Policko =

Policko may refer to the following places:

- Policko, Greater Poland Voivodeship (west-central Poland)
- Policko, Lubusz Voivodeship (west Poland)
- Policko, Koszalin County in West Pomeranian Voivodeship (north-west Poland)
- Policko, Łobez County in West Pomeranian Voivodeship (north-west Poland)
