= Gmina Węgorzyno =

Gmina Węgorzyno Węgorzyno Commune
- Gmina
- Coat of arms
- Interactive map of Gmina Węgorzyno
- Coordinates (Węgorzyno): 53°32′20″N 15°33′46″E
- Country: Poland
- Voivodeship: West Pomeranian
- County: Łobez
- Seat: Węgorzyno

Government
  - City Mayor: Krzysztof Gwóźdź
  - Deputy Mayor: Michał Kupczyński

Area
  - Total: 256.19 km^{2} (98.92 sq mi)

Population (2006)
  - Total: 7,316
  - Density: 28.56/km^{2} (73.96/sq mi)
  - Urban: 3,011
  - Rural: 4,305
- Website: http://www.wegorzyno.pl/

Gmina Węgorzyno is an urban-rural gmina (administrative district) in Łobez County, West Pomeranian Voivodeship, in north-western Poland. Its seat is the town of Węgorzyno, which lies approximately 12 kilometres (7 mi) south of Łobez and 67 km (42 mi) east of the regional capital Szczecin.

The gmina covers an area of 256.19 square kilometres (98.9 sq mi), and as of 2006 its total population is 7,316 (out of which the population of Węgorzyno amounts to 3,011, and the population of the rural part of the gmina is 4,305).

The gmina contains part of the protected area called Ińsko Landscape Park. The river Brzeźnicka Węgorza is within the gmina.

== Villages ==
Apart from the town of Węgorzyno, Gmina Węgorzyno contains the villages and settlements of Brzeźniak, Chwarstno, Cieszyno, Kraśnik Łobeski, Lesięcin, Mielno, Mieszewo, Podlipce, Przytoń, Runowo, Sarnikierz, Sielsko, Stare Węgorzynko, Sulice, Trzebawie, Wiewiecko, Winniki and Zwierzynek.

== Neighbouring gminas ==
Gmina Węgorzyno is bordered by the gminas of Chociwel, Dobra, Drawsko Pomorskie, Ińsko, Łobez and Radowo Małe.
