= Stalag II-D =

- Stargard, Pomerania
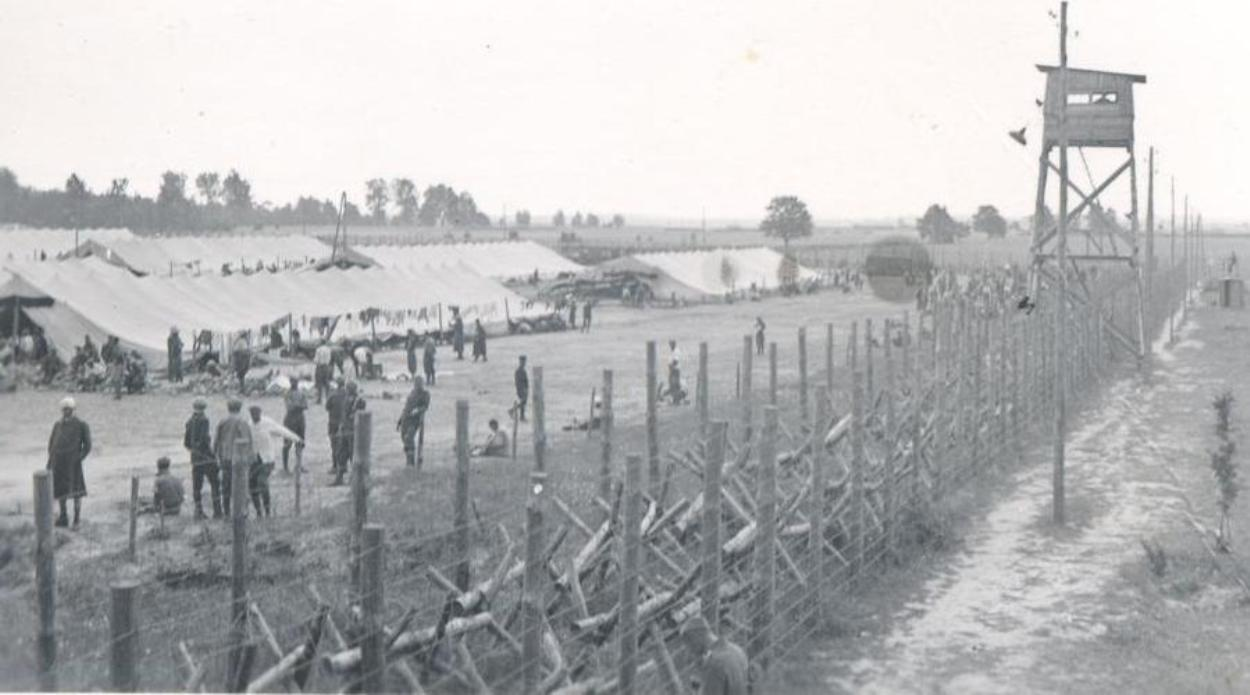
- Stalag II D Stargard, in 1939-1945.

Site information
- Type: Prisoner-of-war camp
- Controlled by: Nazi Germany

Location
- Coordinates: 53.32°N 14.98°E

Site history
- In use: 1939–1945
- Battles/wars: World War II

Garrison information
- Occupants: Polish prisoners of war and civilian prisoners, American, French, Dutch, Belgian, Serbian, Soviet, Italian, Canadian, Moroccan, Tunisian and Senegalese prisoners of war

Stalag II-D Stargard (American named, "Camp #86") was a World War II German Army prisoner-of-war camp located near Stargard, Pomerania. It housed Polish, American, French, Dutch, Belgian, Serbian, Soviet, Italian and Canadian prisoners of war, and Polish civilians. Some 6,000 POWs and civilians died in the camp.

== Camp history ==
The camp was established as a temporary camp Dulag L on a military training ground in September 1939 to detain Polish soldiers and civilians taken prisoner during the German September 1939 offensive, which started World War II. For the first few months they lived in the open or in tents during a very cold winter, while they built the wooden and brick huts for the permanent camp. In October 1939 the Dulag L camp was transformed into the Stalag II-D camp. Polish military officers were imprisoned in the camp until December 1939, and Polish civilians until January 1940. Later also other groups of Polish soldiers were held in the camp.

In May and June 1940 American, French, Dutch and Belgian soldiers taken prisoner during the Battle of France arrived. These were followed by Soviet prisoners from Operation Barbarossa in the summer of 1941. In September and October 1943 Italian prisoners arrived after the Italian capitulation. Canadian prisoners from the Dieppe Raid of August 1942 were transferred to Stargard from Stalag VIII-B in January 1944.

Germans introduced racial segregation, and Poles, Africans, Arabs, Jews and Soviet troops were separated from POWs of other nationalities. There were about 4,600 prisoners from Africa, specifically Moroccans, Tunisians and Senegalese, and there was a high mortality rate among them, although from summer 1940 they were gradually transported to other camps located in southern France. Germans carried out medical experiments on the Senegalese. Serbs also faced noticeably more severe treatment. Hundreds of Soviet POWs were deported to concentration camps. Italian POWs were deported to Meppen, to a subcamp of the Neuengamme concentration camp, in November 1943. Following the Warsaw Uprising of 1944, many Polish civilians, including women and children, were deported to the camp.

The POWs were often used for forced labour in over 1,500 subcamps located in the region. Many died during the work, and were buried near the labour sites.

Late arrivals were Americans, NCOs from the Battle of the Bulge, who left Stalag XIIA Limburg on January 15, 1945, by rail to arrive on January 19, 1945. The camp was liberated by the Soviet Red Army in mid-April 1945.

In 2021–2022, new research was conducted at the site of the former camp, co-financed by the Ministry of Culture and National Heritage of Poland. In 2021, a mass grave of dozens of POWs, most of whom died of exhaustion, was discovered. Another mass grave of more than 100 people, including dozens of civilians, even women and children, most likely Poles deported from Warsaw after the Warsaw Uprising, was discovered in 2022. Further two mass graves of some 100 people—Polish civilians, including women, children and the elderly, and POWs, mainly Soviet—were found in 2023. A mass grave with nearly 200 POWs was discovered in 2024.

== Living conditions ==
The lower ranks prisoners at this camp fared much better than those in many other camps further south. They worked predominately on farms and had the possibility to obtain better nourishment.

== Evacuation and dissolution ==
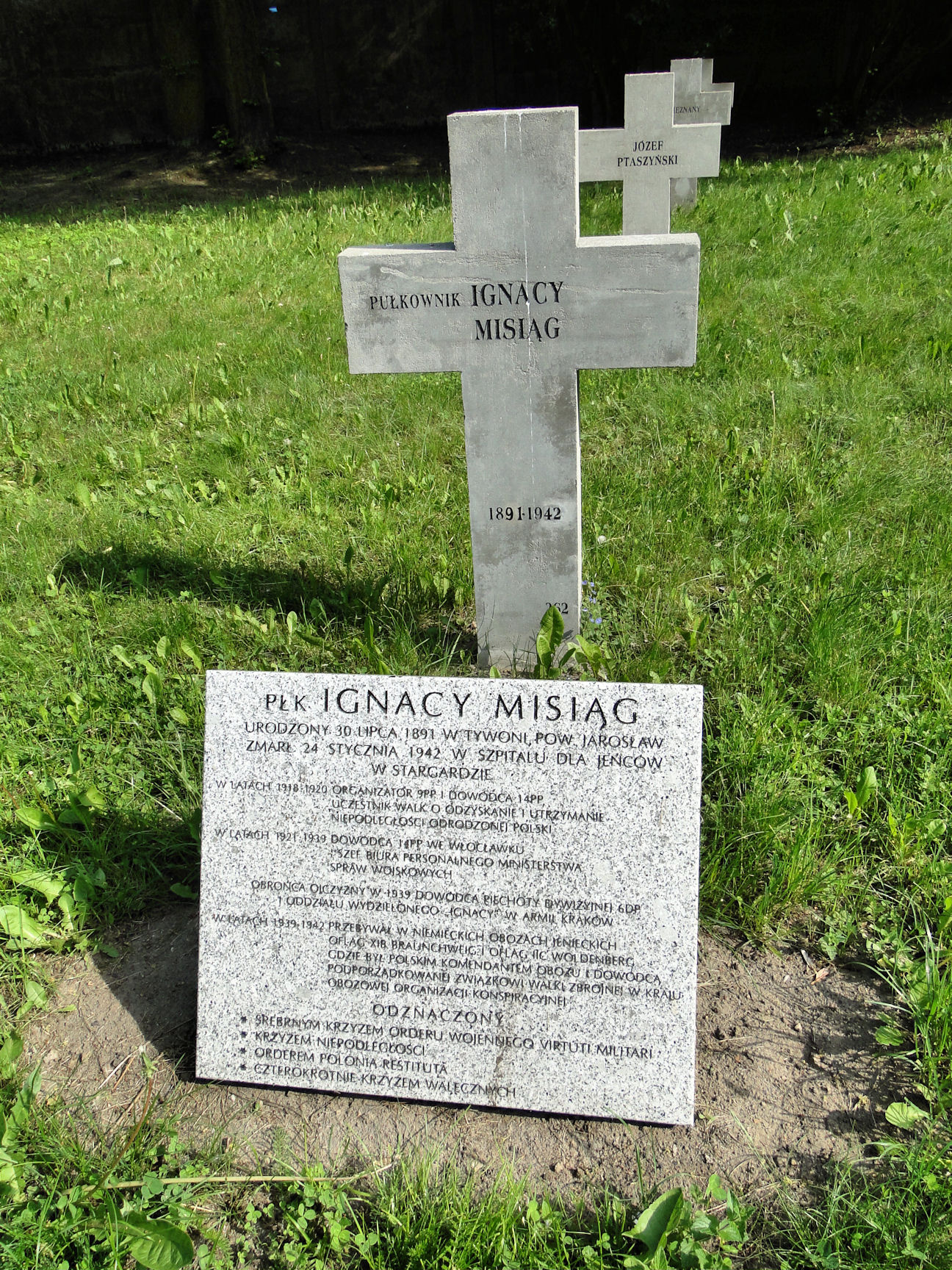
Graves of Polish POWs, who died in the camp

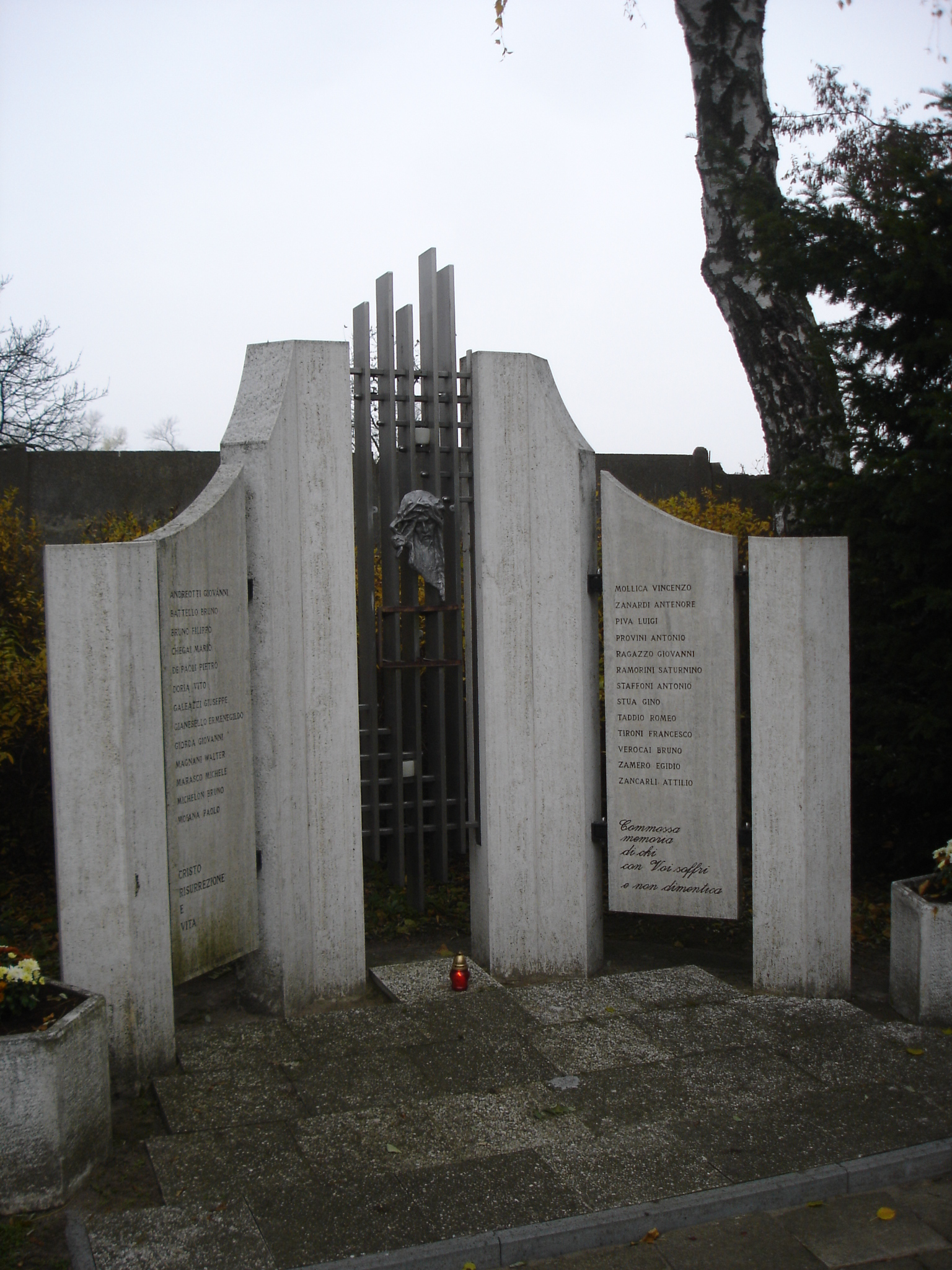
Monument to Italian POWs, who died in the camp

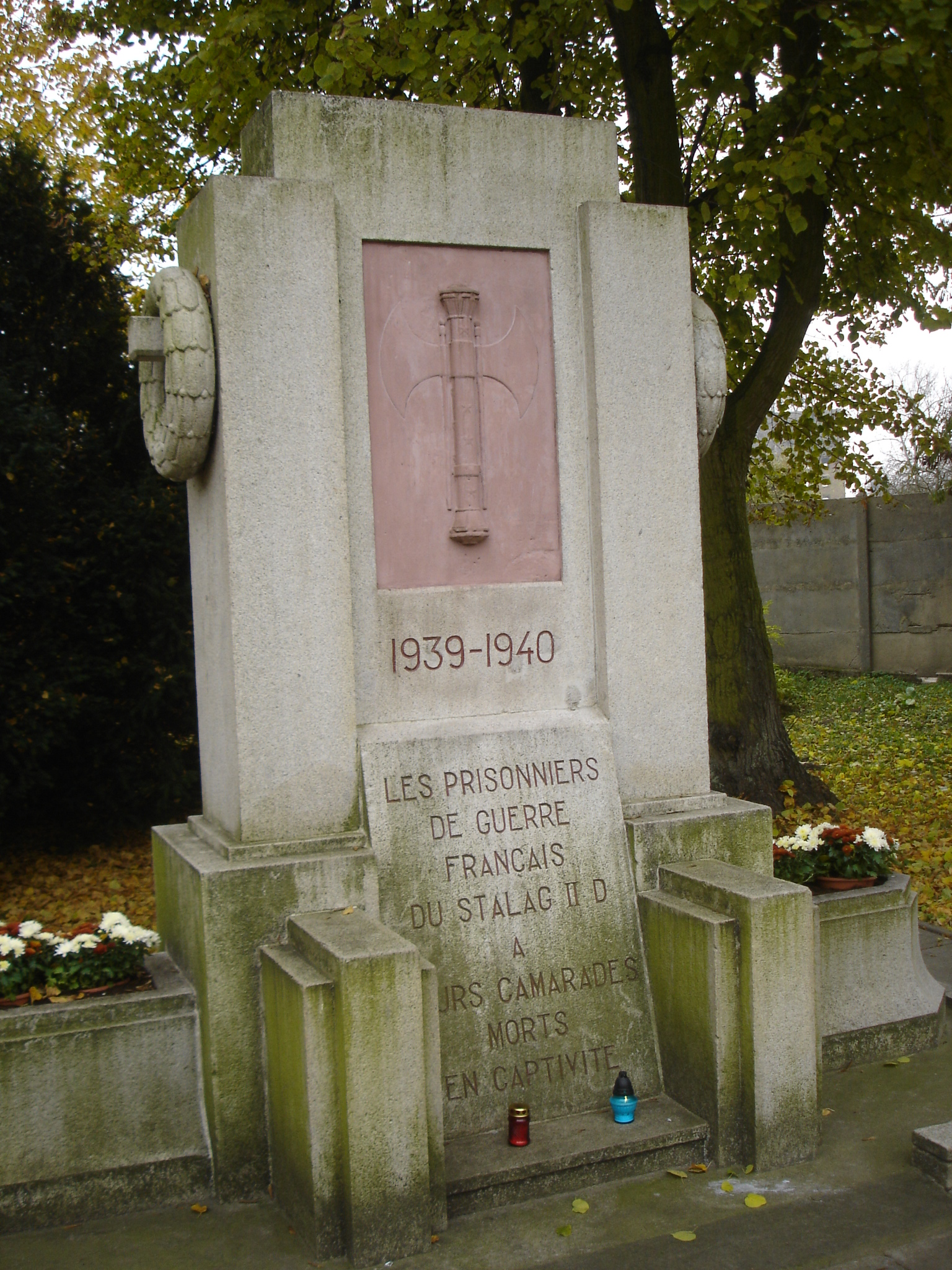
Monument to French POWs, who died in the camp

The first evacuation occurred on 29 January 1945 in blizzard conditions. The count was held up the morning of the march as the MOC (Man of Confidence) was in negotiation with the Kommandant for the safety of the men who were too sick for the march. Many of the sick and infirmed were left behind in the Lazzarett (camp clinic) and were transported by rail or truck at a later date. Almost a thousand men struggled into formation. There were about five-hundred Russians, two-hundred Frenchmen, one-hundred Americans and twenty-five Canadians in the march. Other reports have the number at as many as two-thousand in the column. They were marched twenty-five or thirty kilometers that day. Then were put into a barn, under guard, and slept for the night. Every evening the guards would dump out the meal for the day on the muddy earth. Everyone would scramble for what they could get. In the morning, they were given two slices of bread, counted, and the march began again for twenty-five or thirty kilometers until they reached the next appointed village. Those who fell to the side of the road were rumored to have been shot, but were more likely to have been loaded onto the “dead cart” at the end of the column used to carry the dead, dying, and sick all piled into the cart together and carried to the next stopping point. After two, maybe three days, the column reached Szczecin. The sick and the dead were left at Szczecin while the majority of the rest were moved on to Stalag II-A in Neubrandenburg where they arrived on 7 February 1945. The eight-day total distance of the march was 70–90 miles (120-150 Kilometers).

On 25 February 1945 most of the remaining prisoners were forced to march westward in advance of the Soviet offensive and endured great hardships before they were freed by Allied troops in April 1945.

== Escape ==
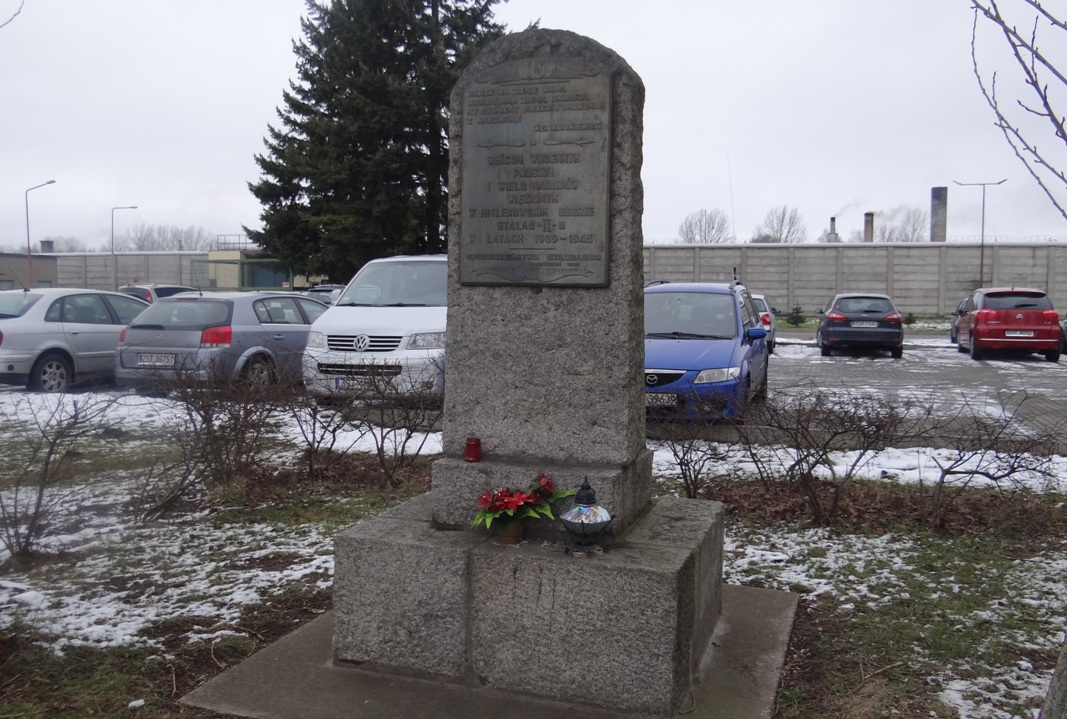
Memorial to the victims of the camp

It was relatively easy to escape from a farm, but much more difficult to evade recapture. Prisoners working on farms did not have the essential assistance that was provided in Oflags by teams of dedicated specialists who forged documents and prepared maps. Without these it was extremely difficult to traverse hundreds of miles past frequent checks by the Nazi police.

Gabriel Regnier, a French prisoner, describes his failed attempt with a French companion on 23 March 1942. A Polish civilian worker at the farm had helped them by hiding civilian clothes for them. It was a dark night and they successfully reached a freight train that was switching cars at the station that was close to the farm. They successfully hid in one box-car full of boxes. But then the train stopped in Szczecin for unloading, they switched to another car loaded with sacks of barley destined for Aachen in western Germany, which they reached four days later. There again they got out to search for a car going to the Netherlands. Unfortunately the driver of a vehicle noticed two persons moving hesitantly along the train and alerted the military police. Recaptured they were returned to Stargard and spent 24 days in solitary confinement.

== Sources ==
- Account of Canadian soldier
- Very detailed memoir of French prisoner (in French)

== See also ==
- List of prisoner-of-war camps in Germany
- Stalag
- Gerald MacIntosh Johnston
