= Węgorzyno =

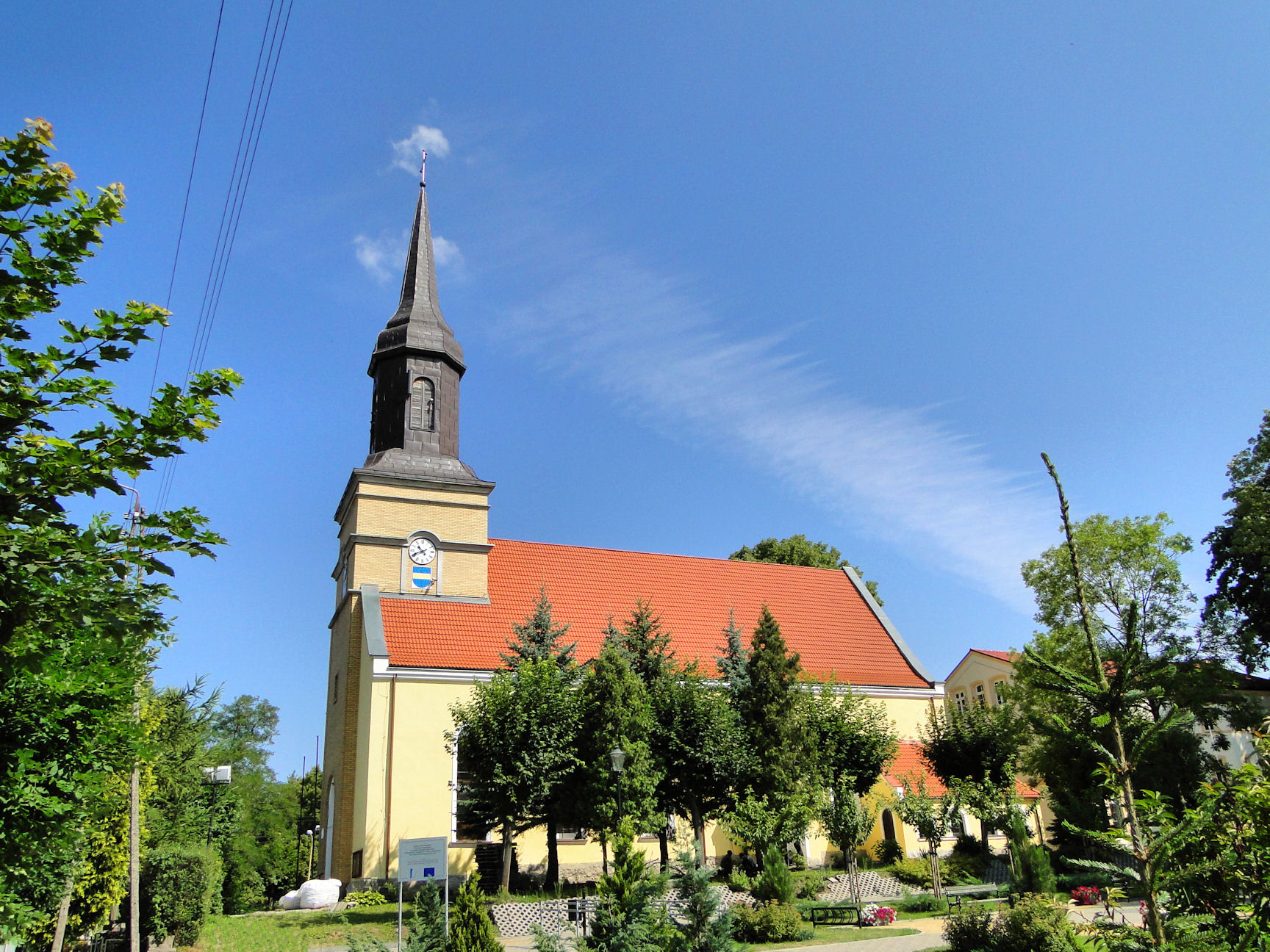
- Church of the Assumption of the Virgin Mary

- Coat of arms

- Location within Poland
- Coordinates: 53°32′20″N 15°33′46″E
- Country: Poland
- Voivodeship: West Pomeranian
- County: Łobez
- Gmina: Węgorzyno
- Town rights: 1460

Area
  - Total: 6.82 km^{2} (2.63 sq mi)

Population (2010)
  - Total: 3,005
  - Density: 441/km^{2} (1,140/sq mi)
- Time zone: UTC+1 (CET)
  - Summer (DST): UTC+2 (CEST)
- Postal code: 73–155
- Vehicle registration: ZLO
- Website: http://www.wegorzyno.pl

Węgorzyno [vɛŋɡɔˈʐɨnɔ] (German: Wangerin) is a town in Łobez County, West Pomeranian Voivodeship, in north-western Poland, located on Lake Węgorzyno. It is the seat of Gmina Węgorzyno. It is a retail and leisure resort.

== History ==
It was granted town rights in 1460.

During World War II, the Germans operated a forced labour subcamp of the Stalag II-D prisoner-of-war camp in the town.

== Demographics ==
Historical population

Year	Pop.	±%
1871	2,611	—
1880	2,709	+3.8%
1890	2,622	−3.2%
1900	2,571	−1.9%
1910	2,747	+6.8%

Year	Pop.	±%
1925	2,936	+6.9%
1950	1,225	−58.3%
1960	1,818	+48.4%
2010	3,005	+65.3%

== Notable residents ==
- Werner Dallmann (1924–1945), Waffen SS officer
- Joachim Christian Timm (1734–1805), German apothecary and botanist
