= Resko =

Town in West Pomeranian Voivodeship, Poland

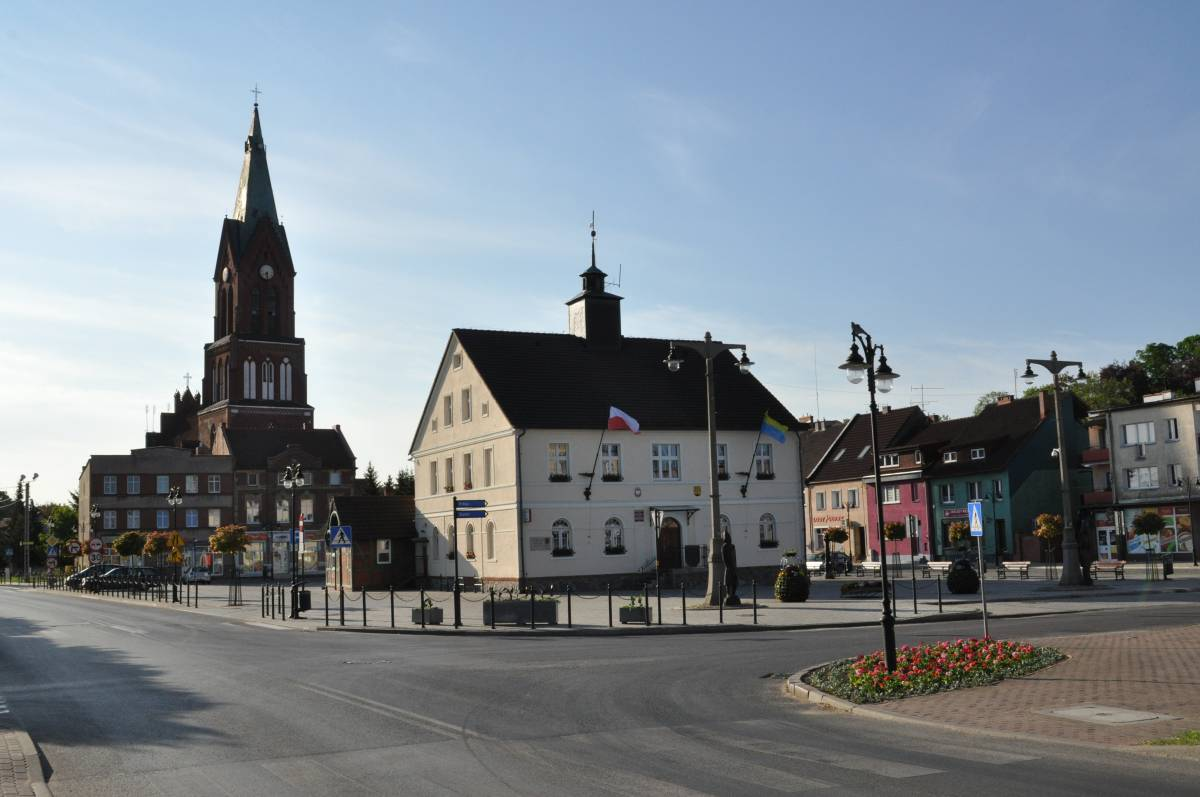
- Main square with the town hall

- Flag Coat of arms

- Location within Poland
- Coordinates: 53°48′N 15°24′E
- Country: Poland
- Voivodeship: West Pomeranian
- County: Łobez
- Gmina: Resko

Area
  - Total: 4.49 km^{2} (1.73 sq mi)

Population (2010)
  - Total: 4,329
  - Density: 964/km^{2} (2,500/sq mi)
- Time zone: UTC+1 (CET)
  - Summer (DST): UTC+2 (CEST)
- Postal code: 72-315
- Vehicle registration: ZLO
- Website: http://www.resko.pl/

Resko [ˈrɛskɔ] (Kashubian: Réga; German: Regenwalde) is a town in Łobez County, West Pomeranian Voivodeship, in north-western Poland, with 4,329 people (2010). It is located on the Rega River.

== History ==
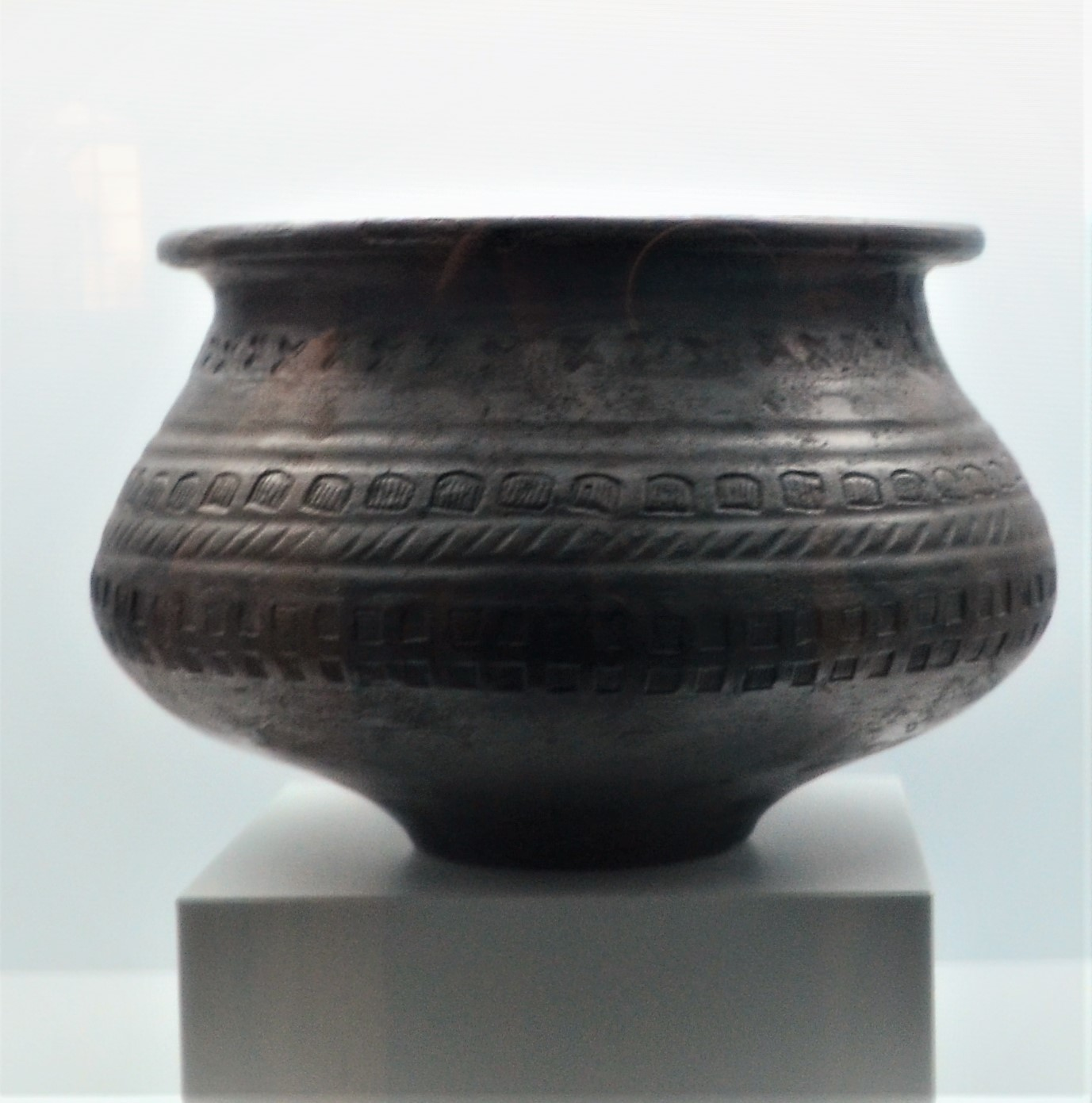
A 5th-century vessel from Resko, from the collection of the National Museum in Szczecin

The first unsuccessful attempt to grant a town charter occurred in 1255. Town rights were eventually granted according to various sources either in 1277, 1280 or 1288. The town suffered from fires in 1593, 1630, 1659, 1694 and 1716. It was most devastated by the Russians during the Seven Years' War of 1756–1763, and the town hall archive was burned.

During World War II, the German administration operated a forced labour subcamp of the Stalag II-D prisoner-of-war camp in the town.

== Demographics ==
Historical population

Year	Pop.	±%
1852	3,163	—
1861	3,442	+8.8%
1871	3,253	−5.5%
1880	3,370	+3.6%
1890	3,183	−5.5%
1900	3,396	+6.7%

Year	Pop.	±%
1910	3,558	+4.8%
1925	3,900	+9.6%
1950	2,109	−45.9%
1960	3,418	+62.1%
2010	4,329	+26.7%

== Climate ==
Resko has an oceanic climate (Köppen climate classification: Cfb) using the −3 °C (27 °F) isotherm or a humid continental climate (Köppen climate classification: Dfb) using the 0 °C (32 °F) isotherm.

Climate data for Resko (1991–2020 normals, extremes 1951–present)
Month	Jan	Feb	Mar	Apr	May	Jun	Jul	Aug	Sep	Oct	Nov	Dec	Year
Record high °C (°F)	13.7 (56.7)	17.5 (63.5)	23.3 (73.9)	30.4 (86.7)	31.2 (88.2)	36.3 (97.3)	37.5 (99.5)	37.1 (98.8)	31.7 (89.1)	27.2 (81.0)	19.0 (66.2)	14.5 (58.1)	37.5 (99.5)
Mean daily maximum °C (°F)	2.4 (36.3)	3.8 (38.8)	7.7 (45.9)	14.1 (57.4)	18.4 (65.1)	21.4 (70.5)	23.9 (75.0)	23.4 (74.1)	18.5 (65.3)	13.0 (55.4)	6.9 (44.4)	3.1 (37.6)	13.1 (55.6)
Daily mean °C (°F)	−0.2 (31.6)	0.7 (33.3)	3.2 (37.8)	8.3 (46.9)	12.7 (54.9)	16.1 (61.0)	18.4 (65.1)	17.7 (63.9)	13.2 (55.8)	8.6 (47.5)	4.2 (39.6)	0.9 (33.6)	8.7 (47.7)
Mean daily minimum °C (°F)	−2.6 (27.3)	−2.0 (28.4)	−0.2 (31.6)	3.1 (37.6)	7.0 (44.6)	10.4 (50.7)	12.8 (55.0)	12.5 (54.5)	9.2 (48.6)	5.4 (41.7)	1.9 (35.4)	−1.4 (29.5)	4.7 (40.5)
Record low °C (°F)	−26.7 (−16.1)	−29.9 (−21.8)	−20.2 (−4.4)	−8.6 (16.5)	−4.3 (24.3)	−0.9 (30.4)	3.7 (38.7)	0.7 (33.3)	−2.4 (27.7)	−6.6 (20.1)	−14.4 (6.1)	−22.3 (−8.1)	−29.9 (−21.8)
Average precipitation mm (inches)	59.2 (2.33)	51.4 (2.02)	55.0 (2.17)	35.5 (1.40)	55.9 (2.20)	72.0 (2.83)	76.9 (3.03)	81.2 (3.20)	60.9 (2.40)	48.9 (1.93)	52.0 (2.05)	65.7 (2.59)	714.7 (28.14)
Average relative humidity (%)	86.7	84.2	79.7	72.8	71.8	74.5	75.9	77.4	82.7	85.1	88.8	89.1	80.7
Mean monthly sunshine hours	38.3	59.0	117.7	193.0	239.8	240.6	243.4	220.4	144.0	99.9	43.4	26.0	1,665.6
Source 1: Institute of Meteorology and Water Management
Source 2: Meteomodel.pl (records, relative humidity 1981–2010)

== Notable residents ==
- Carl Sprengel (1787—1859) a German botanist
- Felicjan Sypniewski (1822—1877) a Polish naturalist, botanist and entomologist
- Friedrich Leo (1851—1914) a German classical philologist
- Ernst Eduard Taubert (1838—1934) a Pomeranian composer, music critic and music educator
- Mieczysław Młynarski (born 1956) a retired Polish professional basketball player and coach
- Bartosz Arłukowicz (born 1971) a Polish center-left politician and pediatrician
