= Łobez =

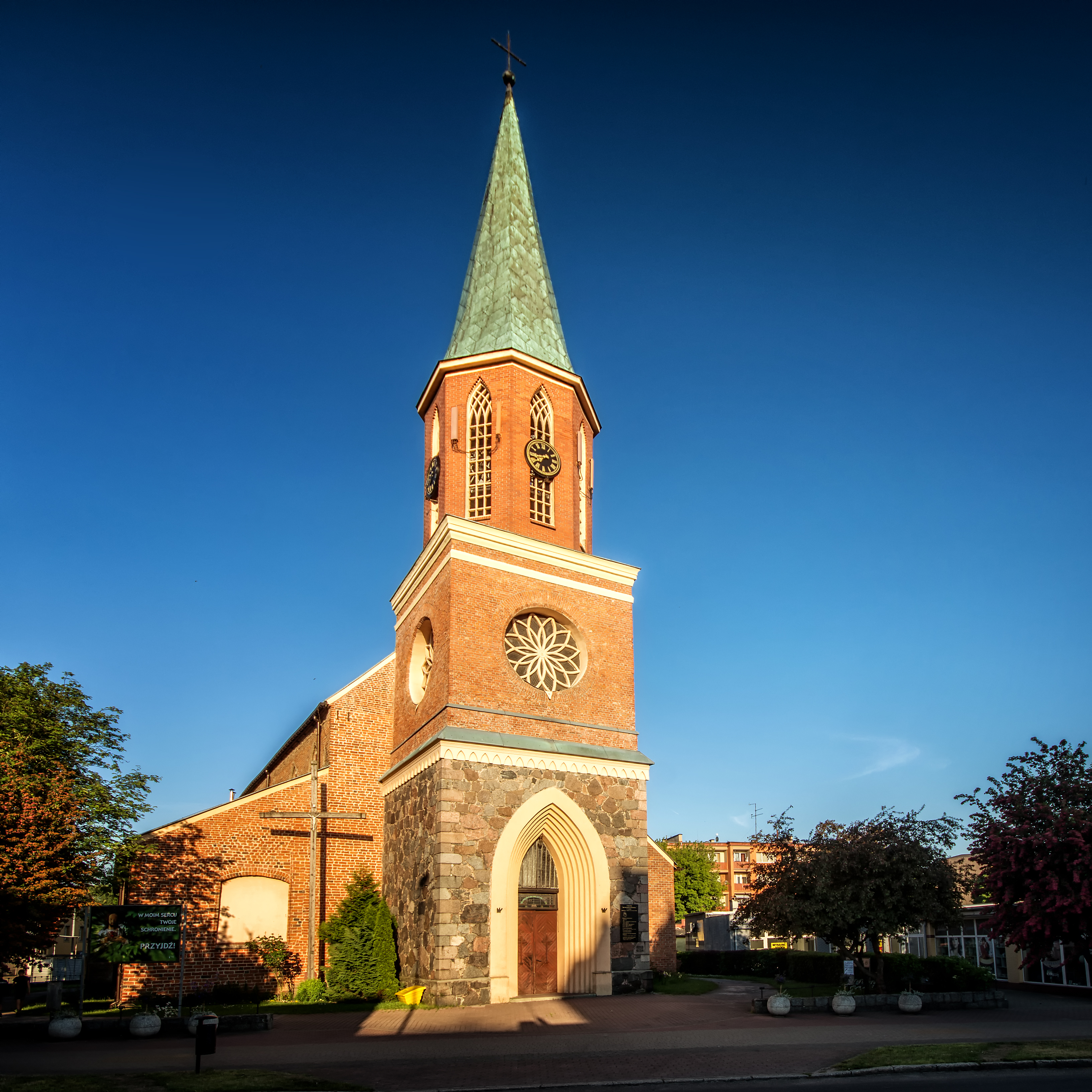
- Church of the Sacred Heart

- Flag Coat of arms

- Location within Poland
- Coordinates: 53°38′N 15°37′E
- Country: Poland
- Voivodeship: West Pomeranian
- County: Łobez
- Gmina: Łobez
- Town rights: 1275

Government
  - Mayor: Piotr Ćwikła

Area
  - Total: 12.8 km^{2} (4.9 sq mi)

Population (2019)
  - Total: 10,066
  - Density: 786/km^{2} (2,040/sq mi)
- Time zone: UTC+1 (CET)
  - Summer (DST): UTC+2 (CEST)
- Postal code: 73-150
- Area code: +48 91
- Car plates: ZLO
- Website: www.lobez.pl

Łobez [ˈwɔbɛs] (Kashubian: Łobéz; German: Labes) is a town on the river Rega in northwestern Poland, within the West Pomeranian Voivodeship. It is the capital of Łobez County, and has a population of 10,066 (2019).

== The name ==
The name Łobez comes from the Old Polish łobuzie (meaning "bushes").

== History ==
In the 12th century Łobez was a Slavic stronghold located within Poland and after the fragmentation of Poland into smaller duchies within the Griffin-ruled Duchy of Pomerania until its dissolution in 1637. Łobez was first mentioned in a document from 1271, according to which a knight named Borko, who was also the Castellan of nearby Kołobrzeg, was the owner of the town. By 1275 Łobez received town rights. A castle was built in the 13th century.

During World War II, the Germans operated two forced labour subcamps of the Stalag II-D prisoner-of-war camp in the town.

== Demographics ==
-

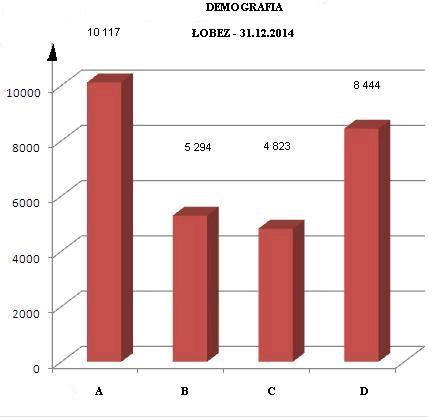
Łobez - demography: A - townsfolk, B - women, C - men, D - adults. 31.12.2014 r.

== Mayors ==
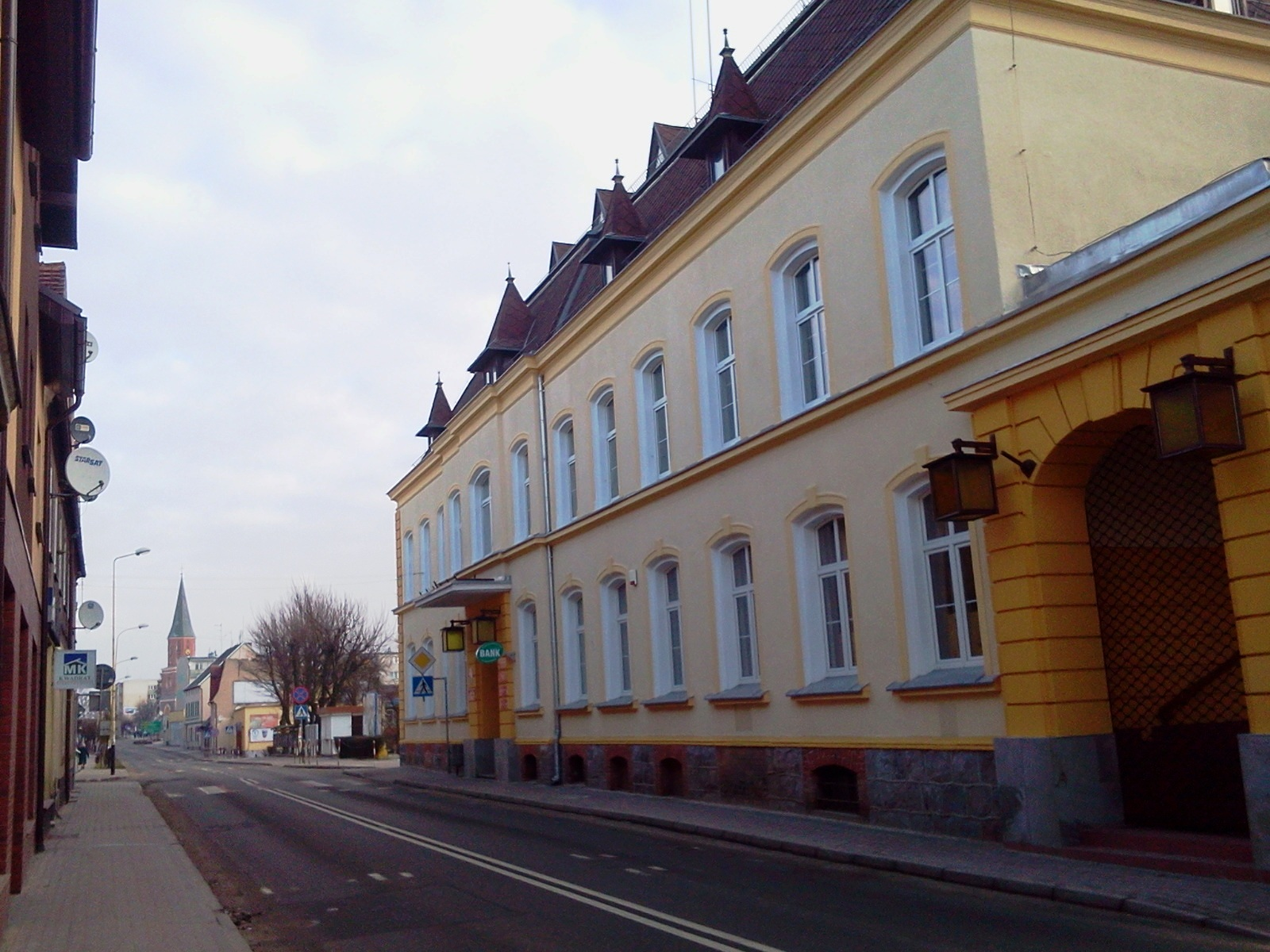
City Hall

| 1632 – Carsten Beleke | 1809 – Johann Georg Falck |
| 1670 – Bernd Bublich | 1823–1840 – Johann Friedrich Rosenow |
| 1700 – Paul Belecke | 1842–1844 – Adolf Ludwig Ritter (privremeno) |
| 1702 – Theele | 1844–1845 – Albert Wilhelm Rizky |
| 1723 – F. C. Hackebeck | 1846–1852 – Heinich Ludwig Gotthilf Hasenjäger |
| 1734 – F. W. Weinholz | prije 1859. Hasenjaeger |
| 1736 – Schulze | 1852–1864 – Carl Albert Alexander Schüz |
| 1732 – Hackenberken | 1921 – Willi Kieckbusch |
| 1745 – M. C. Frize | 1945 – Hackelberg, Teofil Fiutowski, Stefan Nowak, Feliks Mielczarek |
| 1746 – Johann Friedrich Thym | 1946 – Władysław Śmiełowski |
| 1752 – Johann Gottsried Severin | 1948 – Tadeusz Klimski |
| 1753? – J. F. von Flige | 1949 – Ignacy Łepkowski |
| 1757 – Johann Friedrich Thym | 1972-1990 Zbigniew Con |
| 1757 – Heller | 1990–94 Marek Romejko |
| 1767 – Gottlieb Timm | 1994–1998 Jan Szafran |
| 1775 – Johann Gottfried Severin | 1998–2002 Halina Szymańska |
| 1790 – Jahncke | 2002–2006 Marek Romejko |
| 1805 – Heinrich (?) Falck | 2006–2014 Ryszard Sola |
| 1806 – Zuther (drugi dan 1712) | 2014 Piotr Ćwikła |
| 1806 – Nemitz | |

== Notable residents ==
- Otto Puchstein (1856–1911) a German classical archaeologist

== International relations ==
Łobez is twinned with:

| Affing, Germany - Bavaria, since 1997; Svalöv, Sweden, since 2000; Kėdainiai, Lithuania, since 2002 | Paikuse, Estonia, since 2003; Wiek, Germany, since 2008 | Guča, Serbia, since 2010; Istra, - Russia, since 2011 |

== Bibliography ==
- Adam Kogut, Anna Dargiewicz, Barbara Smolska Nazarek: Gmina i miasto Łobez. przewodnik turystyczny / Gemeinde und Stadt Łobez. Reiseführer / Łobez commune and town. Tourist guidebook. Polish - German - English, 64 p., 2001, ISBN 83-7208-020-8 .
- Gmina Łobez (Hrsg.): Łobez. pictures from past to present, Polish - German - English, 82 p., 2004, ISBN 83-917628-5-8 .
