= Landkreis Regenwalde =

District in Pomerania

The Prussian Landkreis Regenwalde in Pomerania was a rural district that existed between 1818 and 1945.

On 1 January 1945 the district included:

- four cities
  - Labes
  - Plathe
  - Regenwalde
  - Wangerin

99 more municipalities with fewer than 2,000 inhabitants.

Administrative divisions of the province of Pomerania (1939).

== Administrative history ==
=== Kingdom of Prussia ===
After the reorganization of the district borders in the Kingdom of Prussia following the Congress of Vienna, the rural district of Regenwalde was created in the government region of Stettin in the Prussian province of Pomerania on 1 January 1818. In 1939, it was reorganized into the government region of Köslin. The district consisted of mostly rural areas around the cities of Labes, Plathe, Regenwalde and Wangerin. The district council (German: Landratsamt) was in Labes.

=== North German Confederation / German Empire ===
From 1 July 1867, the district was part of the North German Confederation and from 1 January 1871 it was part of the German Empire.

On 30 September 1929, there was a reorganization of borders in the district of Regenwalde, as in the rest of Prussia, in the course of which all of the formerly independent manors (German: Gutsbezirke) were dissolved and assigned to neighbouring municipalities (German: Landgemeinden).

On 1 October 1938, the district of Regenwalde was transferred from the government region of Stettin to the government region of Köslin. As of 1 January 1939, the district of Regenwalde had the title Landkreis (rural district), in accordance with nationwide naming conventions.

In the spring of 1945, the territory of the district of Regenwalde was occupied by the Red Army, and after the War, it was placed under Polish administration. Today, the area covered by the district is mainly in Łobez County in the West Pomeranian Voivodeship.

== Local government ==
The district of Regenwalde comprised the urban districts (German: Stadtgemeinden) Labes, Plathe, Regenwalde and Wangerin, several rural municipalities and – until their complete dissolution – a number of independent manors (German: Gutsbezirke).

After the Prussian local government reform of 15 December 1933, from 1 January 1934 there was a uniform local government constitution for all Prussian districts (German: Gemeinden). The former "urban municipalities" were now "towns".

When the German Municipal Code (Deutsche Gemeindeordnung) of 30 January 1935 came into force on 1 April 1935, there was a uniform municipal constitution throughout the Reich, and the former "rural municipalities" (Landgemeinden) became just "municipalities" (German: Gemeinden).

No new constitution for the districts was created; the Kreisordnung für die Provinzen Ost- und Westpreußen, Brandenburg, Pommern, Schlesien and Sachsen of 19 March 1881 remained in effect.

== Districts ==
In 1932, there were 19 local government districts (Amtbezirke) in the rural district of Regenwalde:

1. Bonin
2. Elvershagen
3. Grabow
4. Henkenhagen
5. Lessenthin
6. Maldewin
7. Neukirchen
8. Plathe A
9. Plathe B
10. Regenwalde, Land
11. Roggow A
12. Ruhnow
13. Schönwalde
14. Silligsdorf
15. Stargordt
16. Stramehl
17. Wisbu
18. Witzmitz
19. Wolkow

== Municipalities in 1932 ==
In 1932, the district of Regenwalde included four urban municipalities and 99 rural municipalities:

Towns

1. Labes
2. Plathe
3. Regenwalde
4. Wangerin

Rural municipalities

1. Aalkist
2. Alt Döberitz
3. Altenfließ
4. Bernsdorf
5. Blankenhagen
6. Bonin
7. Christinenhof
8. Daberkow
9. Dorotheenthal
10. Dorow
11. Dübzow
12. Elvershagen
13. Fier
14. Gardin
15. Geiglitz
16. Gerdshagen
17. Gienow
18. Glietzig
19. Groß Borckenhagen
20. Groß Raddow
21. Haseleu
22. Henkenhagen
23. Heydebreck
24. Horst
25. Justemin
26. Justin
27. Kankelfitz
28. Karnitz
29. Karolinenhof
30. Karow
31. Klaushagen
32. Klein Raddow
33. Kratzig
34. Kummerow
35. Kutzer
36. Kümken
37. Labuhn
38. Lasbeck
39. Lessenthin
40. Lietzow
41. Lowin
42. Ludwigshorst
43. Mackfitz
44. Maldewin
45. Meesow
46. Mellen
47. Muddelmow
48. Muhlendorf
49. Natelfitz
50. Natzmersdorf
51. Neu Natelfitz
52. Neu Schönwalde
53. Neuenhagen
54. Neuhof
55. Neukirchen
56. Niederhagen
57. Ornshagen
58. Paatzig
59. Piepenburg
60. Piepenhagen
61. Piepstock
62. Pinnow
63. Polchow
64. Premslaff
65. Prütznow
66. Radem
67. Reckow
68. Rienow
69. Roggow A
70. Roggow B
71. Rosenfelde
72. Rosenow
73. Ruhnow
74. Saagen
75. Sallmow
76. Schmelzdorf
77. Schwerin
78. Schöneu
79. Schönwalde
80. Silligsdorf
81. Stargordt
82. Stramehl
83. Tarnow
84. Teschendorf
85. Unheim
86. Wangerin B
87. Winningen
88. Wisbu
89. Witzmitz
90. Woitzel
91. Woldenburg
92. Wolkow
93. Wurow
94. Zachow
95. Zeitlitz
96. Zimmerhausen
97. Zowen
98. Zozenow
99. Zülzefitz

== Population ==
In 1905, the district had a population of 45,447, of which 45,136 (99.32%) spoke German, 278 (0.61%) spoke Polish, 7 (0.02%) were bilingual and the remainder spoke other languages.

In 1925, the population of the district of Regenwalde was 50,582, of which 48,256 (95.4%) were Protestants, 1,263 (2.5%) were Catholics, 824 (1.6%) were supporters of free churches, and 159 (0.3%) were Jews.

In 1933, the population was 49,753.

== District administrators ==
- 1818-31 Ernst August Philipp von Borcke (1776–1850)
- 1832-56 Georg August Adolf Heinrich von der Osten (1785–1855)
- 1856-64 Kurt Moritz Lebrech von der Osten (1815–88)
- 1864–71 Johann Georg von Loeper (1819–1900)
- 1871-77 Ludwig Ferdinand von Lockstedt (1837–1877)
- 1877-84 Johann Georg von Loeper (1819–1900)
- 1884-93 August Hans Adam Berthold von der Osten (1855–1895)
- 1893-1910 Ernst von Döring (1860–1910)
- 1910-18 Hans Joachim Philipp Hartwig von Normann (1880–1918)
- 1918-31 Herbert Rudolf von Bismarck (1884–1955)
- 1931-45 dr Erich Hüttenhein (1889–1945).
- 1945-46 Pełnomocnik Leopold Płachecki (powiat Ławiczka/powiat łobeski)
- 1946-48 Leopold Płachecki (powiat łobeski)

== Place Names ==
The German place names were essentially maintained throughout until 1945.

== Transport ==
The first railway line in the district, the Stargard-Labes-Belgard line, started operations in 1859 and was run by the Berlin-Stettiner Eisenbahn-Gesellschaft >111.0<; this line was joined at Ruhnow by a line of the Pommersche Centralbahn to Dramburg ab >111.j<. To the west, as from 1882 there was a line of the Altdamm-Colberger Eisenbahn-Gesellschaft, with the stations Piepenburg und Plathe >111.d<. From 1893, Piepenburg could be reached from the station Regenwalde South >111.g<.

In 1906, the Prussian state railways opened a subsidiary line to Regenwalde North from Wurow on the Stargard-Belgard line >111.h< and in the following year this was extended to Regenwalde South >111.g<. From 1909 it was possible to travel from Regenwalde North toward Wietstock via the new railway junction at Plathe>111.h<.

This 120-kilometre railway network was complemented by 77 kilometres of narrow-gauge railway:

Regenwalder Kleinbahnen AG built their first line from Labes to Meesow, where it branched off to Daber and Sallmow, from where, as from 1907, there was a line to Regenwalde North >113.m+m^{2}<.

(The numbers in >< refer to the German railway timetable (Deutsches Kursbuch) 1939.
