= Karwowo Lake =

Lake in Poland

Karwowo lake
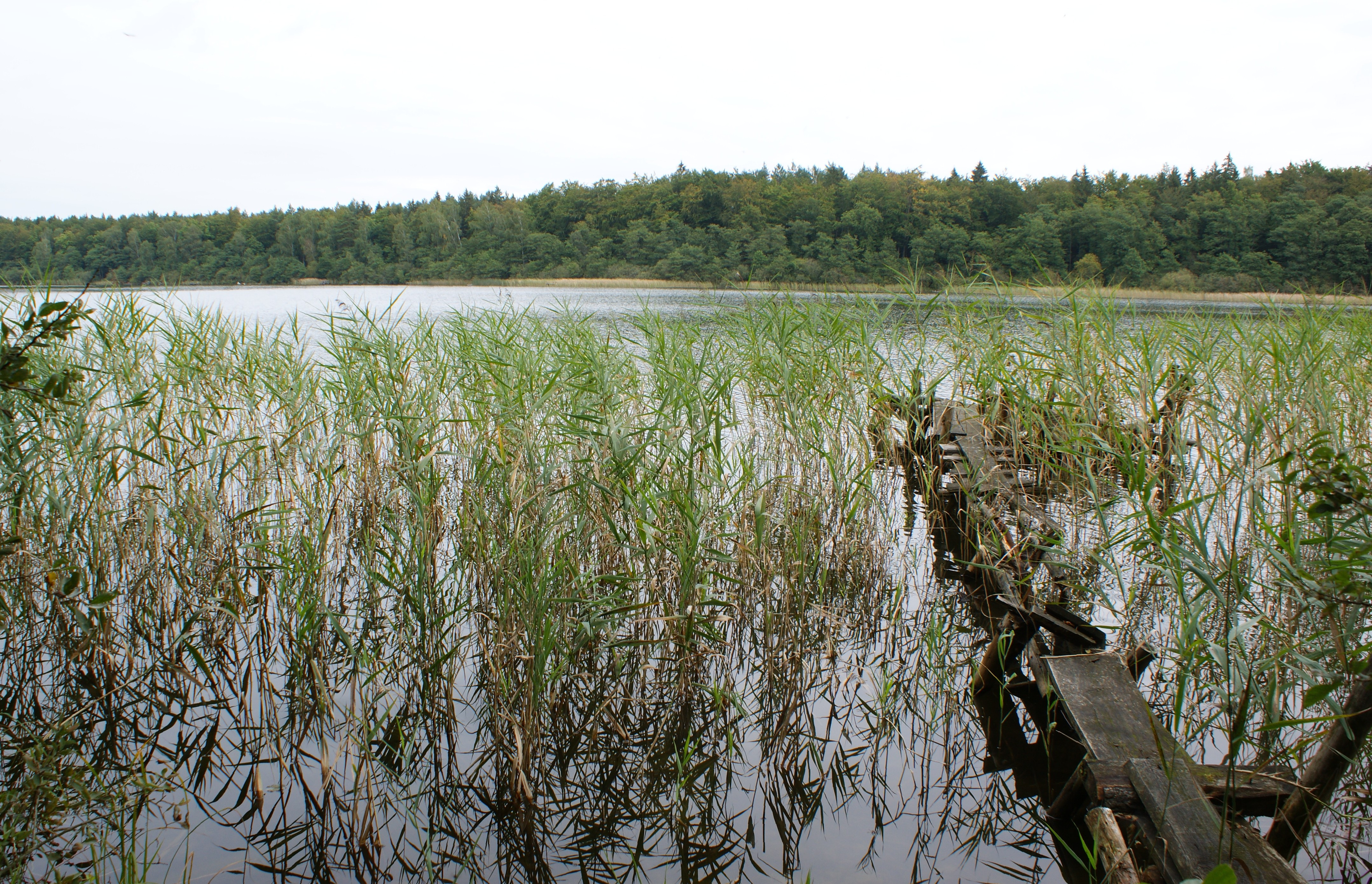

- Location within West Pomeranian Voivodeship
- Location: Łobez Plateau
- Coordinates: 53°41′26″N 15°33′02″E
- Basin countries: Poland
- Max. length: 1.1 km (0.68 mi)
- Max. width: 0.4 km (0.25 mi)
- Surface area: 33.3 ha (82 acres)
- Average depth: 3.5 m (11 ft)
- Max. depth: 4.2 m (14 ft)
- Islands: none

Karwowo is a lake in West Pomeranian Voivodeship, in Łobez County, in Gmina Łobez. It is situated about 500 meters from the Rega river and about one kilometer from residential buildings which are a part of the Karwowo village. The area of Karwowo lake equals 33.3 ha, the length is 1.1 km, the maximal depth is 4.2 m, and the average depth is 3.5 m.

On the shore of Karwowo lake there are small piers for fishermen. On the east shore there is a small resort and bathing place with parking, campsite, fireplace and overhead protection. The lake is surrounded by a beech forest. There is also a blue 12.7 km long bicycle track from Przyborze.

Karwowo lake is also home to a variety of fish species, such as tench, esox, perch, roach, common carp or eel. That is why the "fishing district" no. 12 was situated here. The lake is also connected to the Rega river by a canal. Karwowo is a part of so-called "silent zone", established by Polish Fishing Union. It means that all self-propelled vessels are not allowed here.
