= Zachełmie =

Zachełmie may refer to the following places in Poland:

- Zachełmie, Lower Silesian Voivodeship (south-west Poland)
- Zachełmie, Świętokrzyskie Voivodeship (south-central Poland)
- Zachełmie, West Pomeranian Voivodeship (north-west Poland)
