= Trzeszczyna =

- Settlement
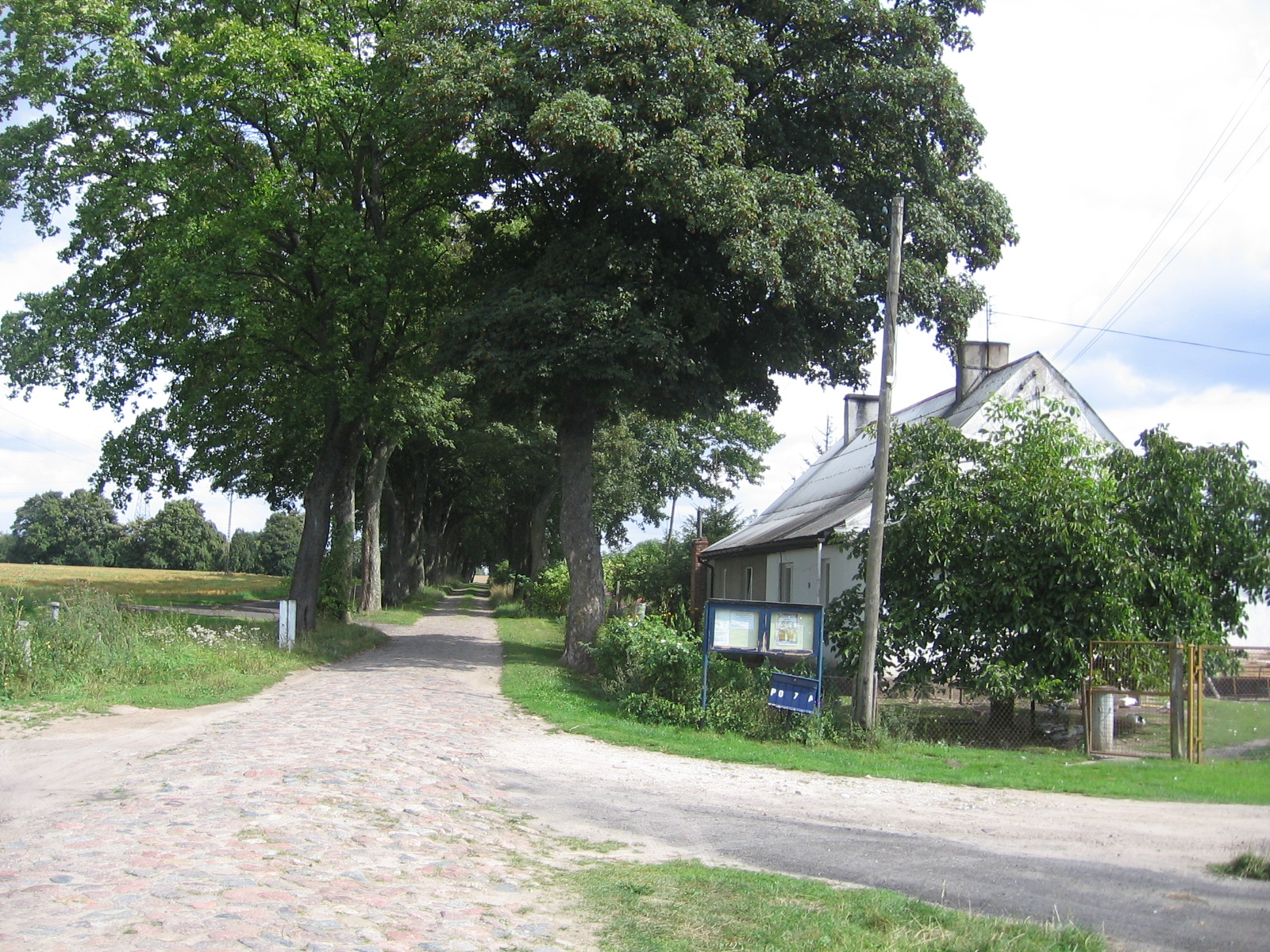

- Location within Poland
- Coordinates: 53°40′16.583″N 15°35′59.921″E
- Country: Poland
- Voivodeship: West Pomeranian
- County: Łobez
- Gmina: Łobez
- Postal code: 73-150
- Area code: +48 91
- Car Plates: ZLO

Trzeszczyna (German: Heinrichsfelde, pronunciation: [tʂɛʂˈt͡ʂɨna]) is a settlement in the administrative district of Gmina Łobez, within Łobez County, West Pomeranian Voivodeship, in north-western Poland. It lies approximately 5 km (3 mi) north of Łobez and 73 km (45 mi) north-east of the regional capital Szczecin. Trzeszczyna is a part of the sołectwo of Dalno. The village has a population of 40.

The settlement developed as a result of fusion of the lands which belonged to a merchant from Łobez named Borchardt. In Trzeszczyna there is a park, which is noted in the heritage register.

Between 1975 and 1998 Trzeszczyna was a part of Szczecin Voivodeship.
