= Byszewo =

Byszewo may refer to the following places:

- Byszewo, Kuyavian-Pomeranian Voivodeship (north-central Poland)
- Byszewo, Masovian Voivodeship (east-central Poland)
- Byszewo, Kołobrzeg County in West Pomeranian Voivodeship (north-west Poland)
- Byszewo, Łobez County in West Pomeranian Voivodeship (north-west Poland)
