= Pomorzany (disambiguation) =

Pomorzany is a municipal neighborhood in Szczecin, Poland.

Pomorzany may also refer to:

- Pomorzany, Masovian Voivodeship, east-central Poland
- Pomorzany, Świętokrzyskie Voivodeship, south-central Poland
- Pomorzany, Koszalin County, in West Pomeranian Voivodeship, north-west Poland
- Pomorzany, Łobez County, in West Pomeranian Voivodeship, north-west Poland
- Pomoryany (Polish: Pomorzany), in Zolochiv Raion, Lviv Oblast, Ukraine
