= Zakrzyce =

Zakrzyce may refer to the following places in Poland:

- Zakrzyce, Lower Silesian Voivodeship (south-west Poland)
- Zakrzyce, West Pomeranian Voivodeship (north-west Poland)
