= Polakowo, Łobez County =

Polakowo
- Village
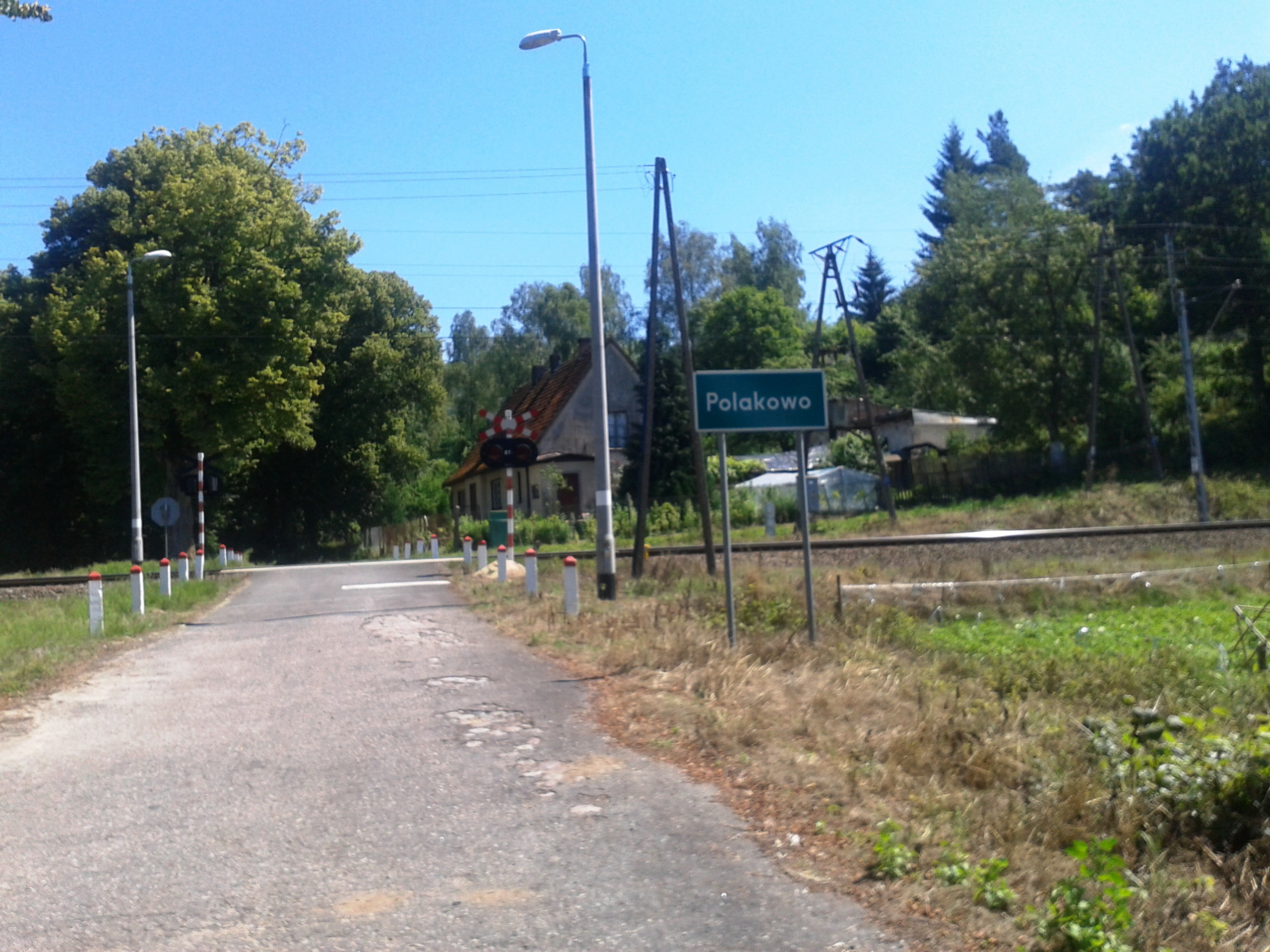
- Polakowo

- Location within Poland
- Coordinates: 53°40′08″N 15°39′30″E
- Country: Poland
- Voivodeship: West Pomeranian
- County: Łobez
- Gmina: Łobez

Polakowo [pɔlaˈkɔvɔ] is a village in the administrative district of Gmina Łobez, within Łobez County, West Pomeranian Voivodeship, in north-western Poland.

For the history of the region, see History of Pomerania.
