= Grabowo, Łobez County =

Grabowo
- Village
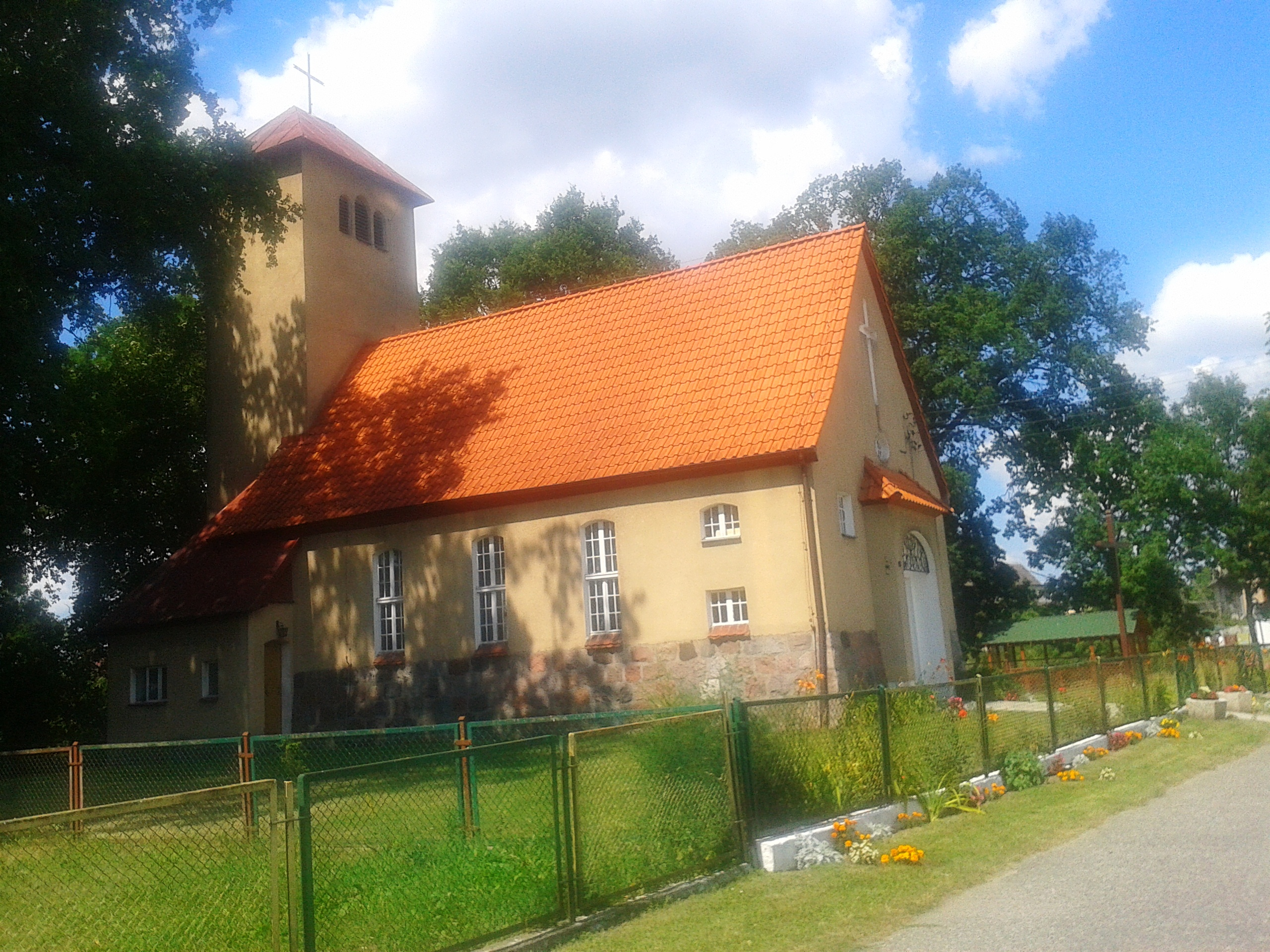
- Grabowo - church

- Location within Poland
- Coordinates: 53°40′N 15°41′E
- Country: Poland
- Voivodeship: West Pomeranian
- County: Łobez
- Gmina: Łobez

Grabowo [ɡraˈbɔvɔ] (formerly German: Grabow) is a village in the administrative district of Gmina Łobez, within Łobez County, West Pomeranian Voivodeship, in north-western Poland. It lies approximately 6 km (4 mi) north-east of Łobez and 78 km (48 mi) east of the regional capital Szczecin.
