= Meszne =

- Village
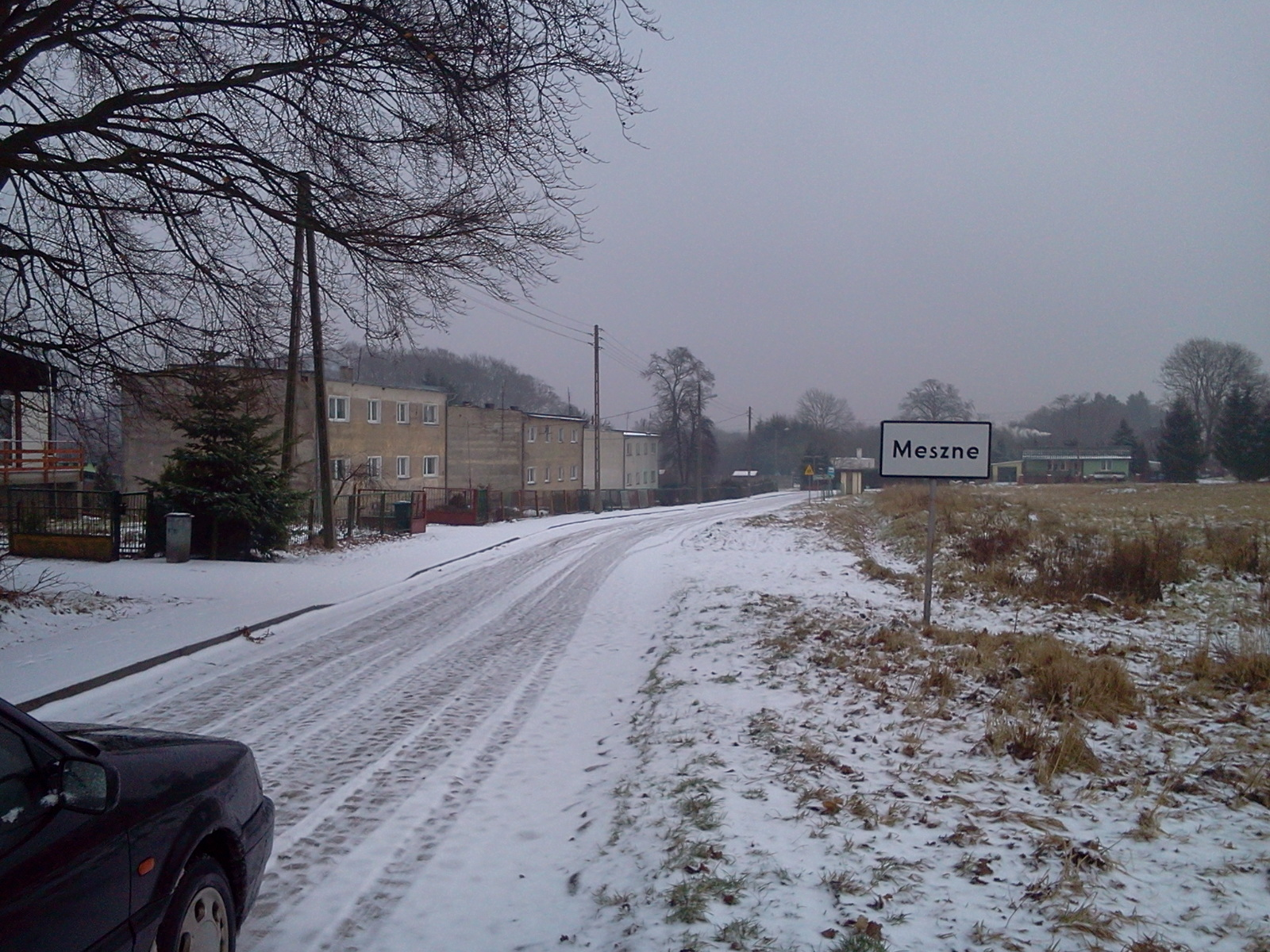
- Meszne

- Location within Poland
- Coordinates: 53°38′37″N 15°31′13″E
- Country: Poland
- Voivodeship: West Pomeranian
- County: Łobez
- Gmina: Łobez
- Population: 80

Meszne [ˈmɛʂnɛ] is a village in the administrative district of Gmina Łobez, within Łobez County, West Pomeranian Voivodeship, in north-western Poland. It lies approximately 7 km (4 mi) west of Łobez and 67 km (42 mi) east of the regional capital Szczecin.

For the history of the region, see History of Pomerania.

The village has a population of 80.
