= Kołdrąb, West Pomeranian Voivodeship =

Kołdrąb
- Settlement
- Location within Poland
- Coordinates: 53°38′04″N 15°39′00″E
- Country: Poland
- Voivodeship: West Pomeranian
- County: Łobez
- Gmina: Łobez

Kołdrąb [ˈkɔwdrɔmp] is a settlement in the administrative district of Gmina Łobez, within Łobez County, West Pomeranian Voivodeship, in north-western Poland.
