= Łobżany =

- Village
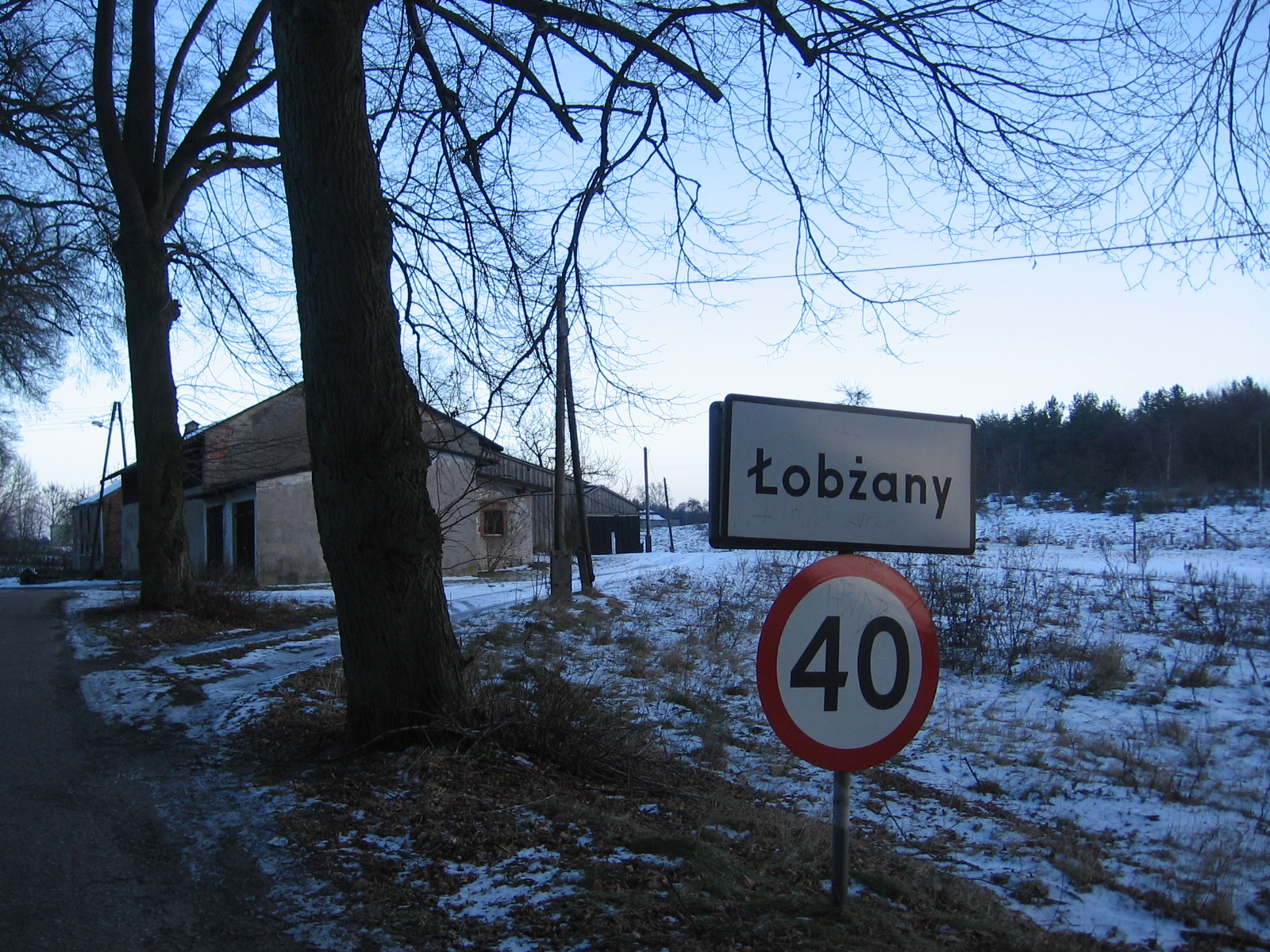
- The entrance to the village

- Location within Poland
- Coordinates: 53°42′N 15°37′E
- Country: Poland
- Voivodeship: West Pomeranian
- County: Łobez
- Gmina: Łobez

Government
  - Sołtys: Grzegorz Piotrowicz
- Elevation: 110 m (360 ft)
- Population: 75
- Time zone: UTC+1 (CET)
  - Summer (DST): UTC+2 (CEST)
- Postal code: 73-150
- Area code: +48 91
- Car Plates: ZLO

Łobżany (pronunciation: [wɔbˈʐanɨ], German: Labes A und D, Labes Tivoli) is a village in the administrative district of Gmina Łobez, within Łobez County, West Pomeranian Voivodeship, in north-western Poland. It lies approximately 8 km (5 mi) north of Łobez and 76 km (47 mi) north-east of the regional capital Szczecin. The village is located about one kilometre from Voivodeship Road no. 148. Łobżany may also be accessed via a field path connected to the Przemysłowa Street in Łobez.

For the history of the region, see History of Pomerania. Between 1975 and 1998, the village was a part of Szczecin Voivodeship. The village has a population of 80.

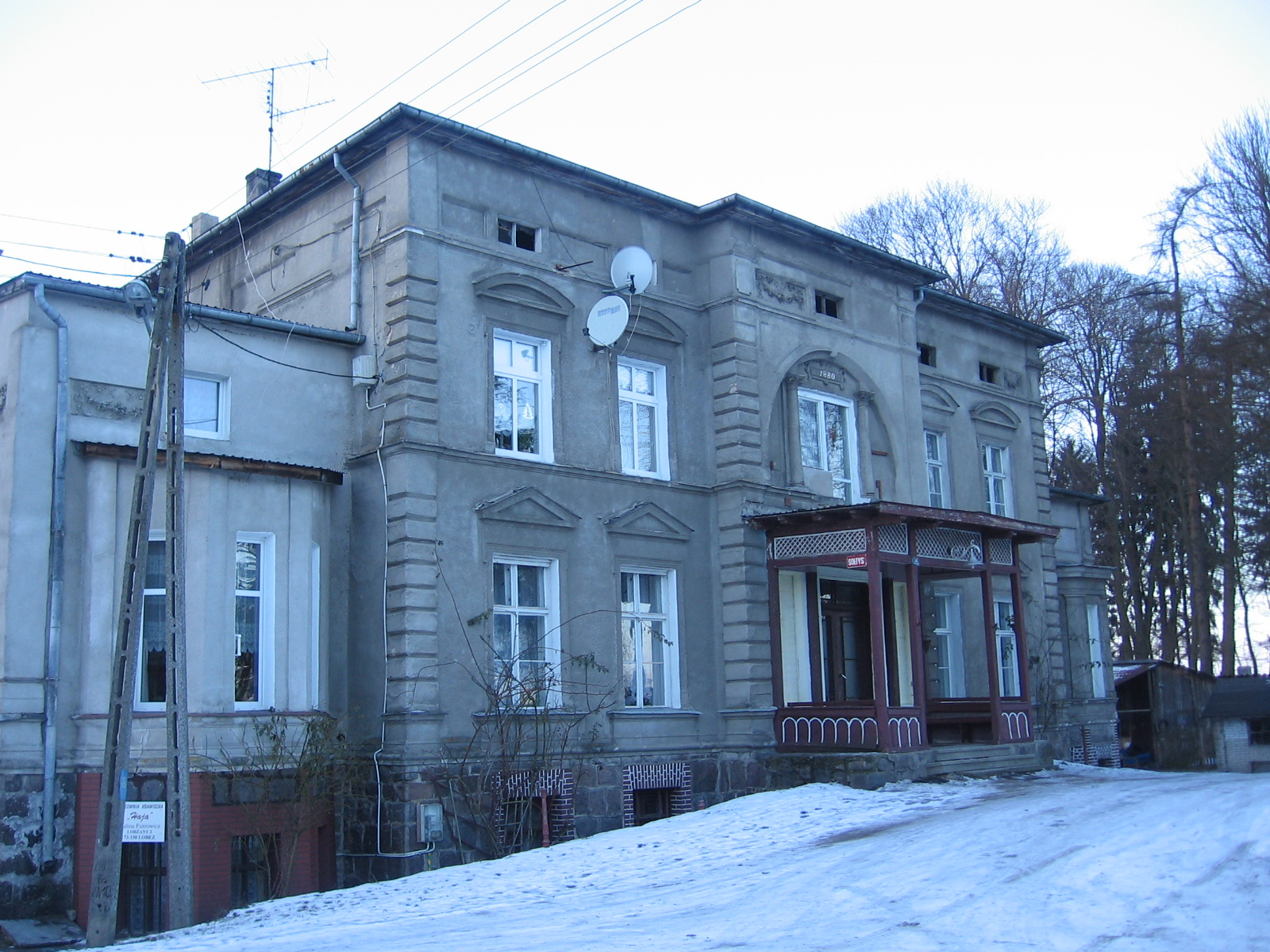
The manor house in Łobżany.

Łobżany is a post-manor farm village which came into existence as a descendant of two manor farms whose land agents were the von Borcke family. The source of the village's name suggests that the village was closely associated with Łobez in the past. The last owner of the tenement until 1945 was Martha von Borcke.

There is an 1880 manor house in Łobżany with some features of renaissance architecture, built by Louis von Borcke. It is a two-story building with a wooden porch entrance. The original kitchen lift within is preserved. The building is capped with a flat roof, incorporating lower pavilions with bay windows on each side. The whole building is capped with an arched moulding decorated with fruit and blossom designs.

In front of the manor house is a park in which yews, considered a natural monument, are grown. There is also a nearby park with high larches. Łobżany has a wilderness hut and a village day-room. The whole complex is surrounded in the north by ponds, between which grow old oaks. There is also a bicycle path in Łobżany's territory.
