= Rynowo-Kolonia =

- Settlement
- Location within Poland
- Coordinates: 53°38′N 15°45′E
- Country: Poland
- Voivodeship: West Pomeranian
- County: Łobez
- Gmina: Łobez

Rynowo-Kolonia [rɨˈnɔvɔ kɔˈlɔɲja] is a settlement in the administrative district of Gmina Łobez, within Łobez County, West Pomeranian Voivodeship, in north-western Poland. It lies approximately 9 km (6 mi) east of Łobez and 81 km (50 mi) east of the regional capital Szczecin.

For the history of the region, see History of Pomerania.
