= Budziszcze =

- Village
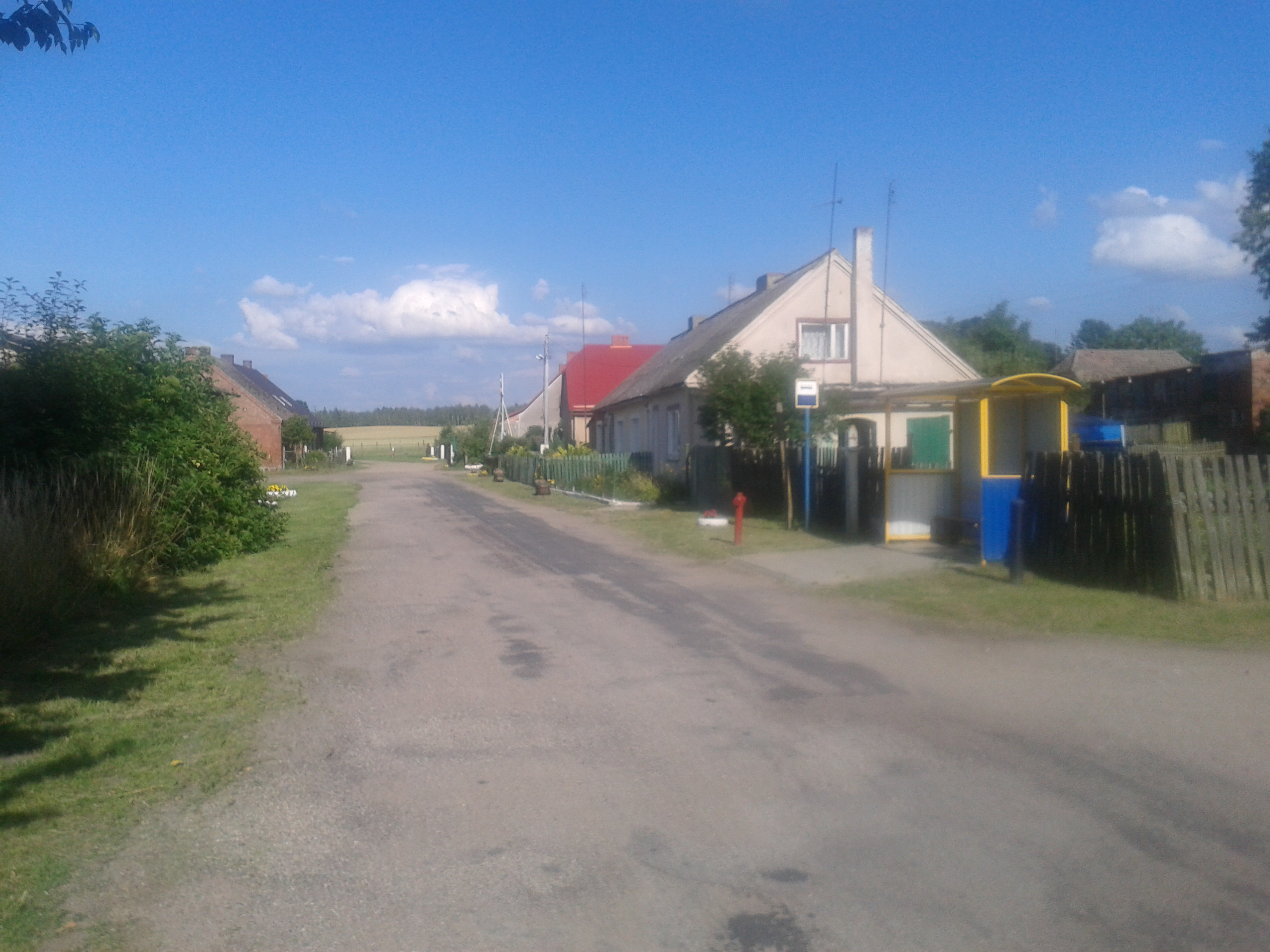
- Budziszcze

- Location within Poland
- Coordinates: 53°36′14″N 15°40′55″E
- Country: Poland
- Voivodeship: West Pomeranian
- County: Łobez
- Gmina: Łobez
- Population: 40

Budziszcze [buˈd͡ʑiʂt͡ʂɛ] is a village in the administrative district of Gmina Łobez, within Łobez County, West Pomeranian Voivodeship, in north-western Poland. It lies approximately 6 km (4 mi) south-east of Łobez and 76 km (47 mi) east of the regional capital Szczecin.

For the history of the region, see History of Pomerania.

The village has a population of 40.
