= Niegrzebia =

- Village
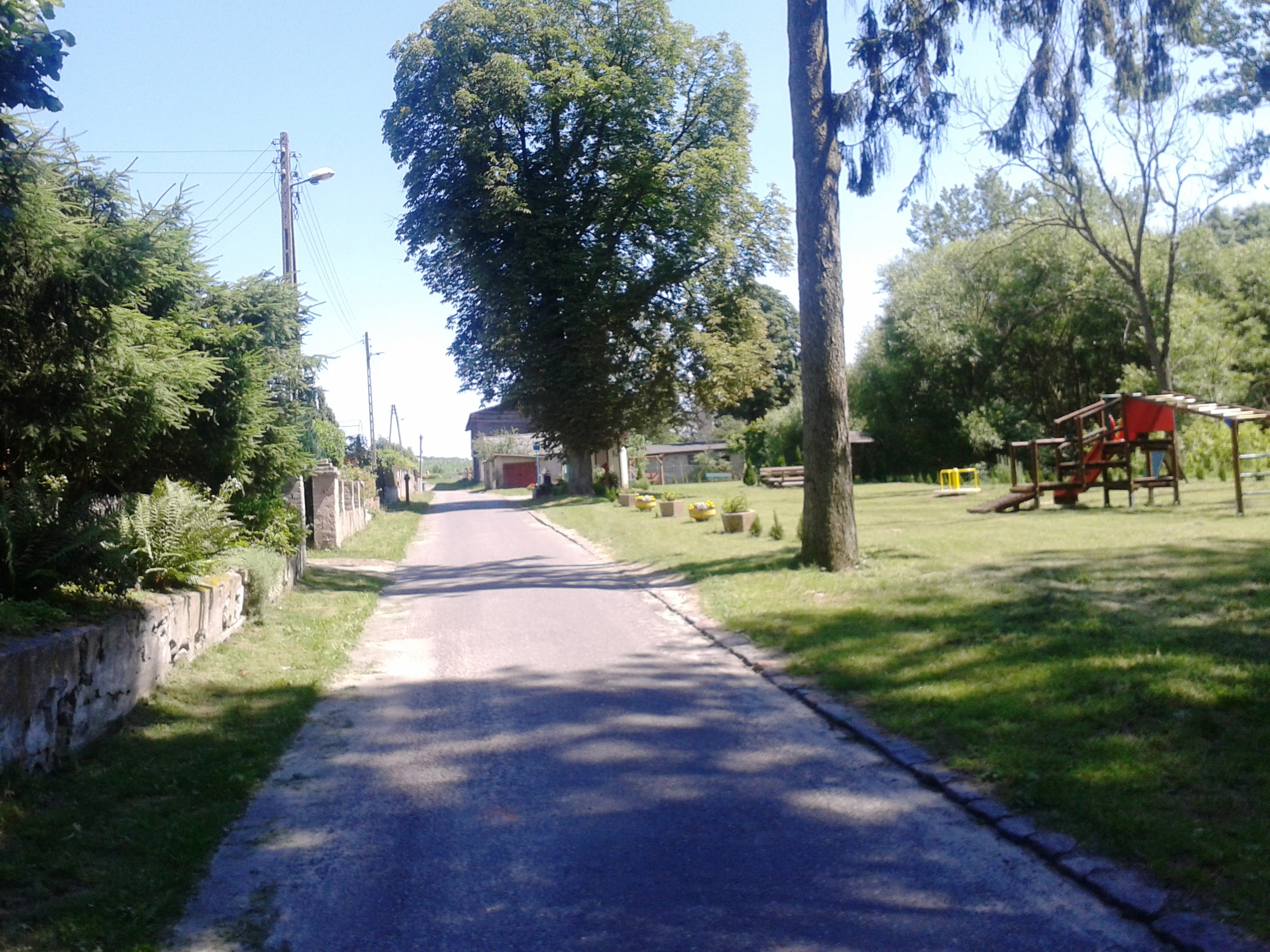
- Niegrzebia

- Location within Poland
- Coordinates: 53°38′N 15°39′E
- Country: Poland
- Voivodeship: West Pomeranian
- County: Łobez
- Gmina: Łobez
- Time zone: UTC+1 (CET)
  - Summer (DST): UTC+2 (CEST)
- Vehicle registration: ZLO

Niegrzebia [ɲɛˈɡʐɛbja] is a village in the administrative district of Gmina Łobez, within Łobez County, West Pomeranian Voivodeship, in north-western Poland. It lies approximately 3 km (2 mi) east of Łobez and 75 km (47 mi) east of the regional capital Szczecin.

During World War II, the German administration operated a forced labour subcamp of the Stalag II-D prisoner-of-war camp in the village.
