= Bonin, Łobez County =

Bonin
- Village
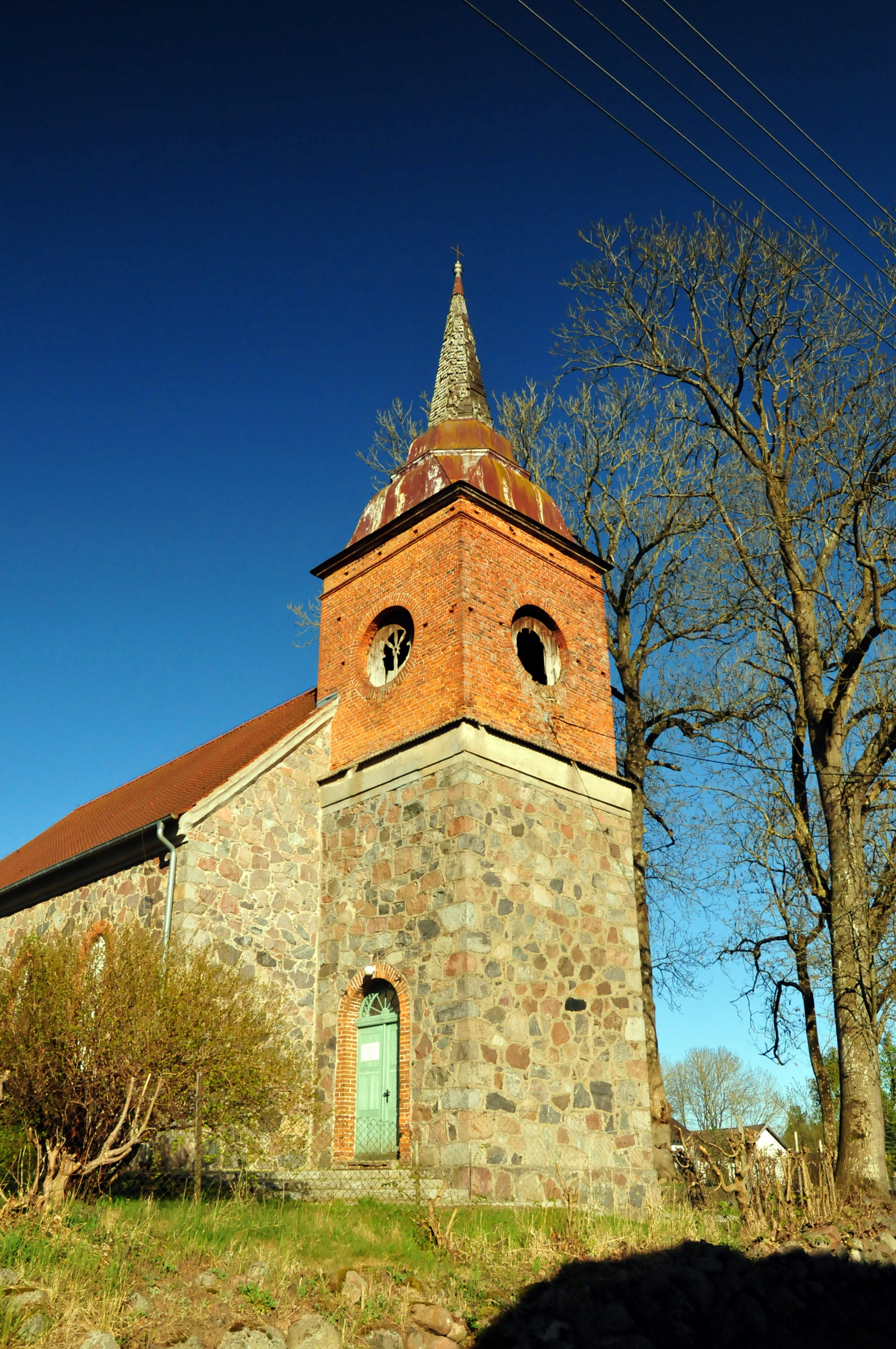
- Bonin - church

- Location within Poland
- Coordinates: 53°36′N 15°39′E
- Country: Poland
- Voivodeship: West Pomeranian
- County: Łobez
- Gmina: Łobez
- Elevation: 34 m (112 ft)
- Population: 118

Bonin [ˈbɔɲin] is a village in the administrative district of Gmina Łobez, within Łobez County, West Pomeranian Voivodeship, in north-western Poland. It lies approximately 5 km (3 mi) south-east of Łobez and 74 km (46 mi) east of the regional capital Szczecin.

For the history of the region, see History of Pomerania.

The village has a population of 118.
