= Zagórzyce, West Pomeranian Voivodeship =

Zagórzyce
- Village
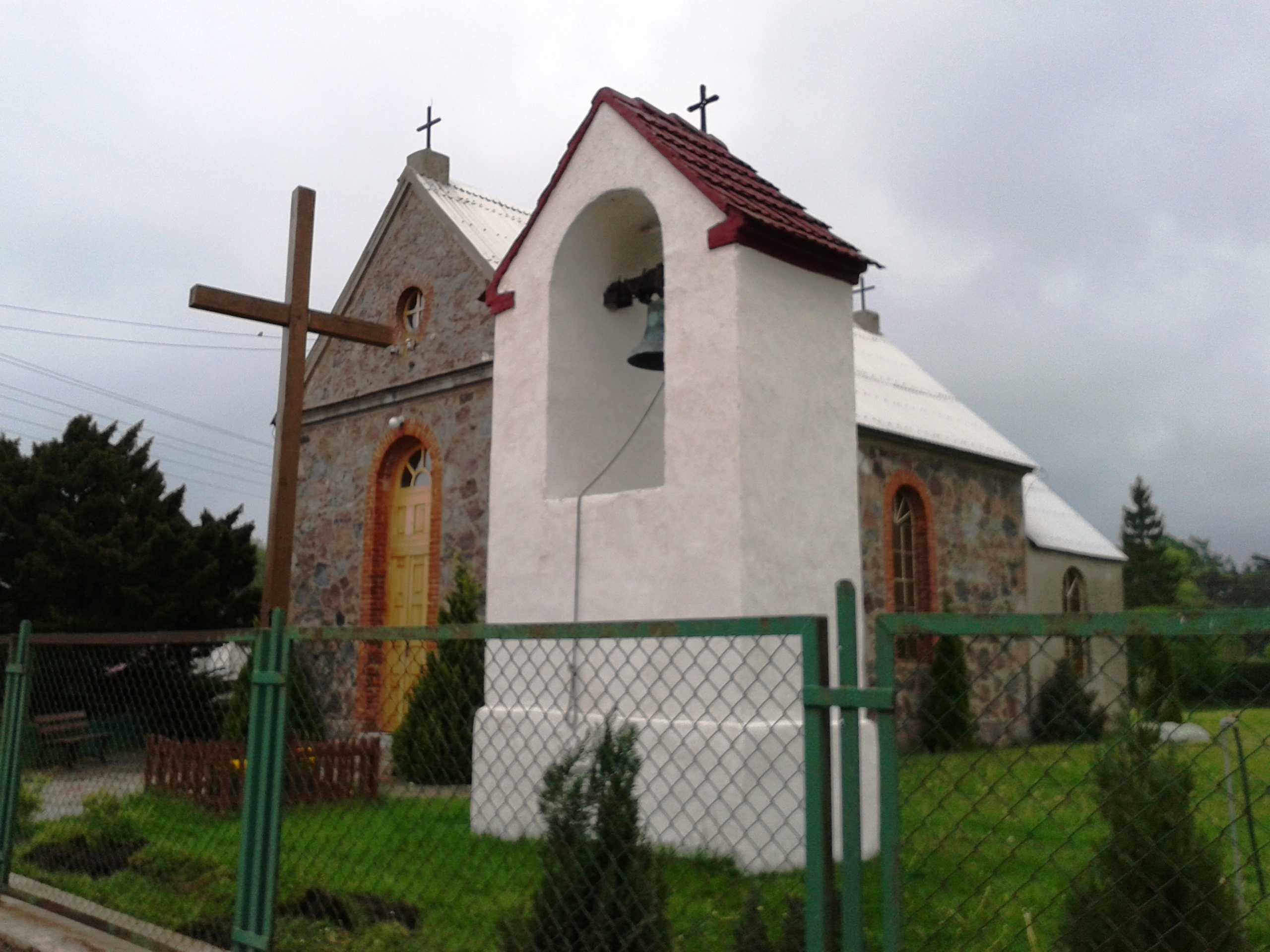
- Zagórzyce - church

- Location within Poland
- Coordinates: 53°36′39″N 15°44′26″E
- Country: Poland
- Voivodeship: West Pomeranian
- County: Łobez
- Gmina: Łobez

Zagórzyce [zaɡuˈʐɨt͡sɛ] is a village in the administrative district of Gmina Łobez, within Łobez County, West Pomeranian Voivodeship, in north-western Poland.

For the history of the region, see History of Pomerania.
