= Klępnica =

- Village
- Location within Poland
- Coordinates: 53°43′51″N 15°38′27″E
- Country: Poland
- Voivodeship: West Pomeranian
- County: Łobez
- Gmina: Łobez
- Population (approx.): 80

Klępnica [klɛmpˈɲit͡sa] is a village in the administrative district of Gmina Łobez, within Łobez County, West Pomeranian Voivodeship, in north-western Poland. It lies approximately 11 km (7 mi) north of Łobez and 79 km (49 mi) north-east of the regional capital Szczecin.

For the history of the region, see History of Pomerania.

The village has an approximate population of 80.
