= Bełczna =

- Village
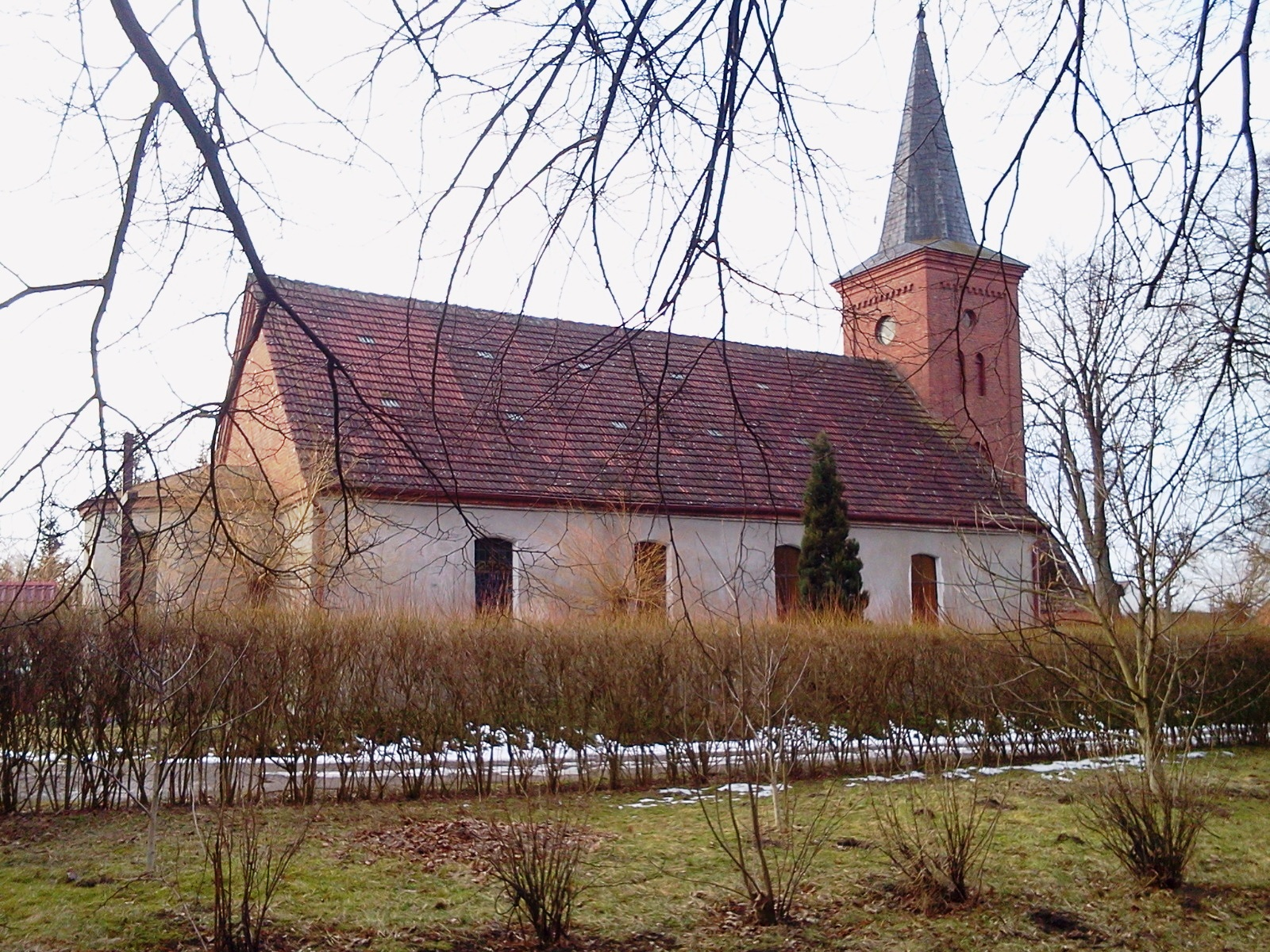
- Church in Bełczna

- Location within Poland
- Coordinates: 53°42′48.73″N 15°35′35.5″E
- Country: Poland
- Voivodeship: West Pomeranian
- County: Łobez
- Gmina: Łobez
- Elevation: 104 m (341 ft)
- Population: 339

Bełczna (Polish pronunciation: [ˈbɛwt͡ʂna]; formerly German: Neukirchen) is a village in the administrative district of Gmina Łobez, within Łobez County, West Pomeranian Voivodeship, in north-western Poland.

For the history of the region, see History of Pomerania.

The village has a population of 339.
