= Pomorzany, Łobez County =

Pomorzany
- Settlement
- Location within Poland
- Coordinates: 53°38′48″N 15°47′29″E
- Country: Poland
- Voivodeship: West Pomeranian
- County: Łobez
- Gmina: Łobez

Pomorzany [pɔmɔˈʐanɨ] is a settlement in the administrative district of Gmina Łobez, within Łobez County, West Pomeranian Voivodeship, in north-western Poland.

For the history of the region, see History of Pomerania.
