= Zajezierze, West Pomeranian Voivodeship =

Zajezierze
- Village
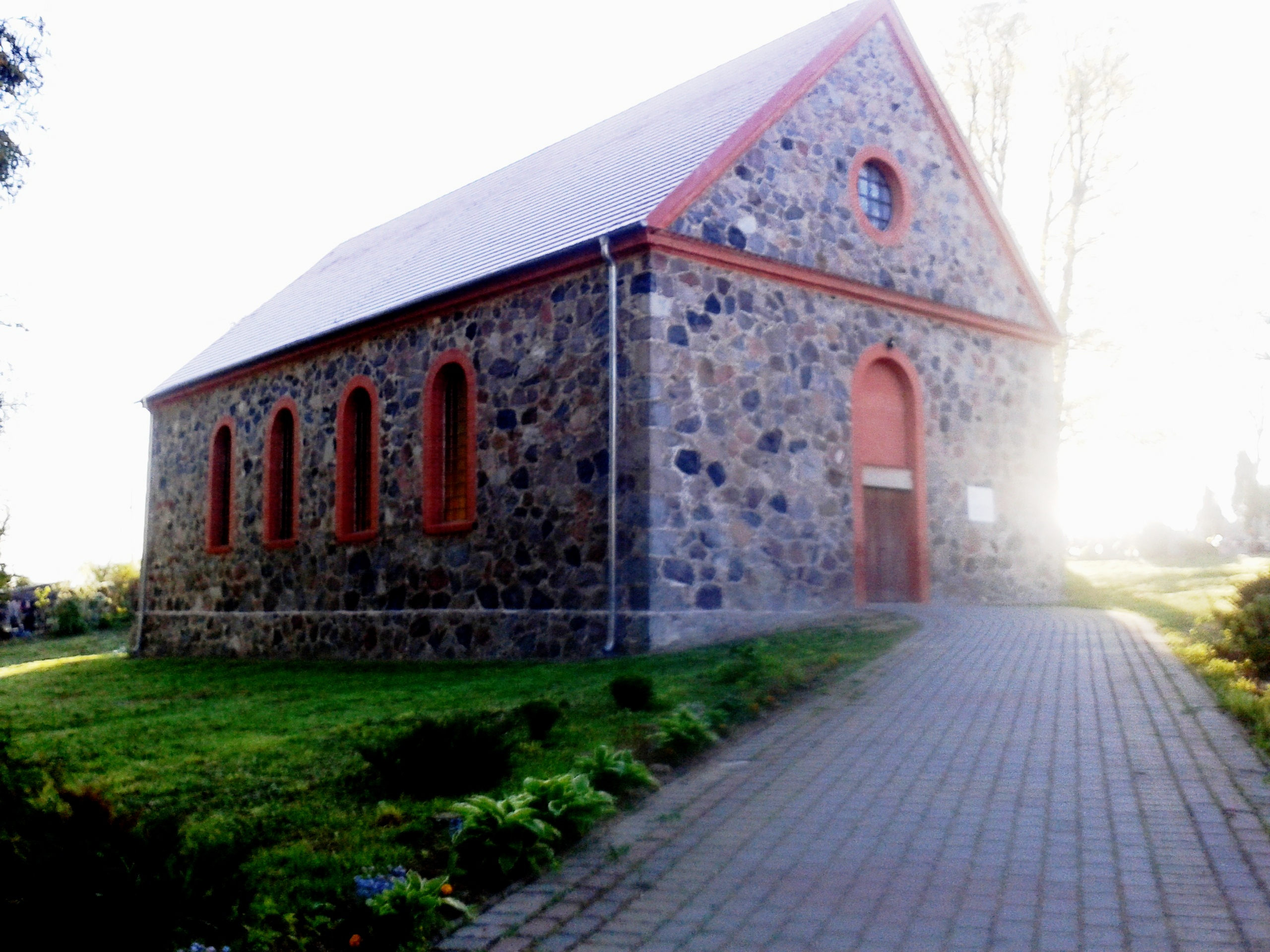
- Zajezierze - church

- Location within Poland
- Coordinates: 53°35′N 15°44′E
- Country: Poland
- Voivodeship: West Pomeranian
- County: Łobez
- Gmina: Łobez

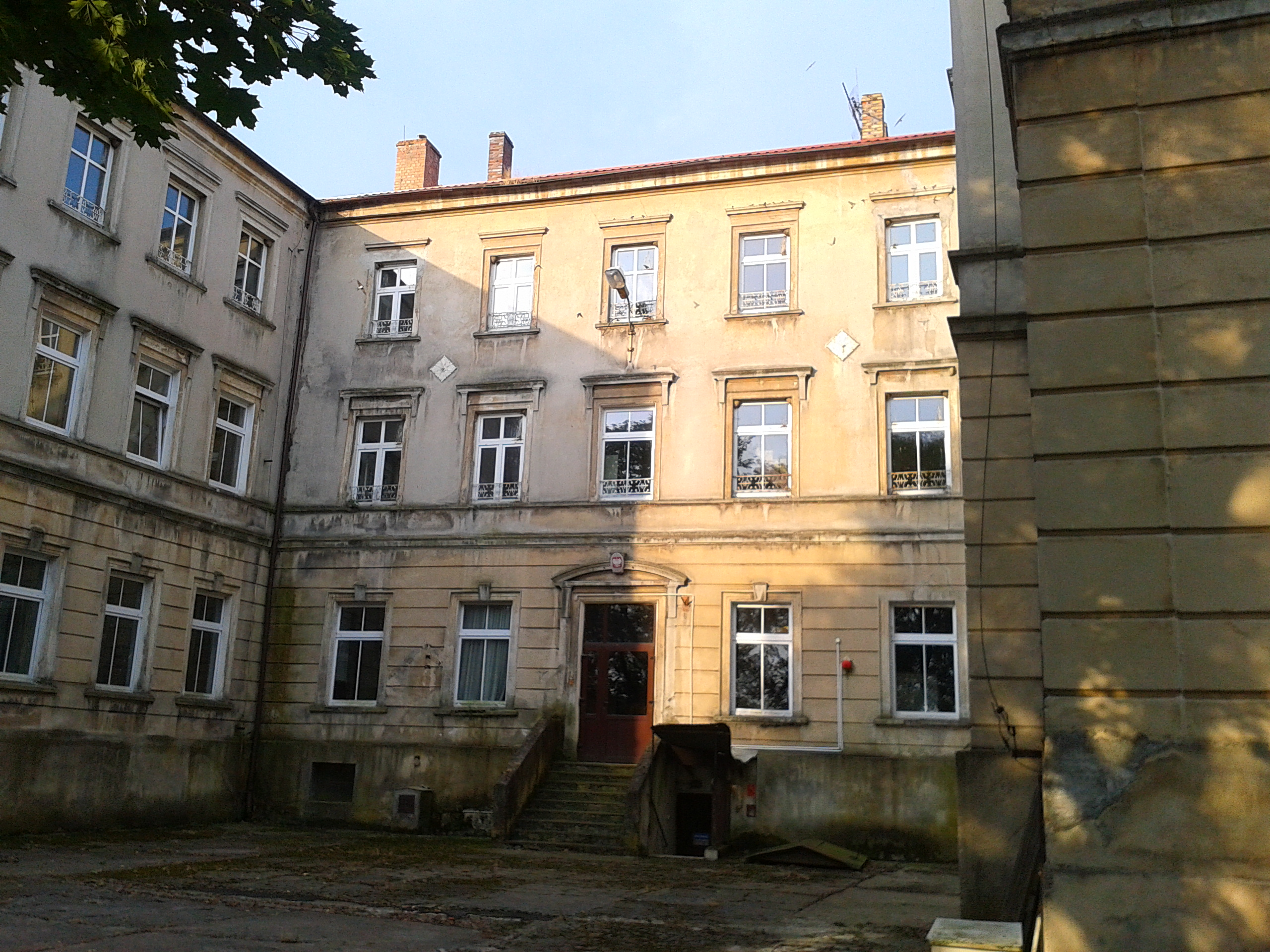
Palace in Zajezierze

Zajezierze [zajɛˈʑɛʐɛ] is a village in the administrative district of Gmina Łobez, within Łobez County, West Pomeranian Voivodeship, in north-western Poland. It lies approximately 10 km (6 mi) south-east of Łobez and 79 km (49 mi) east of the regional capital Szczecin.
