= Byszewo, Łobez County =

Byszewo
- Settlement
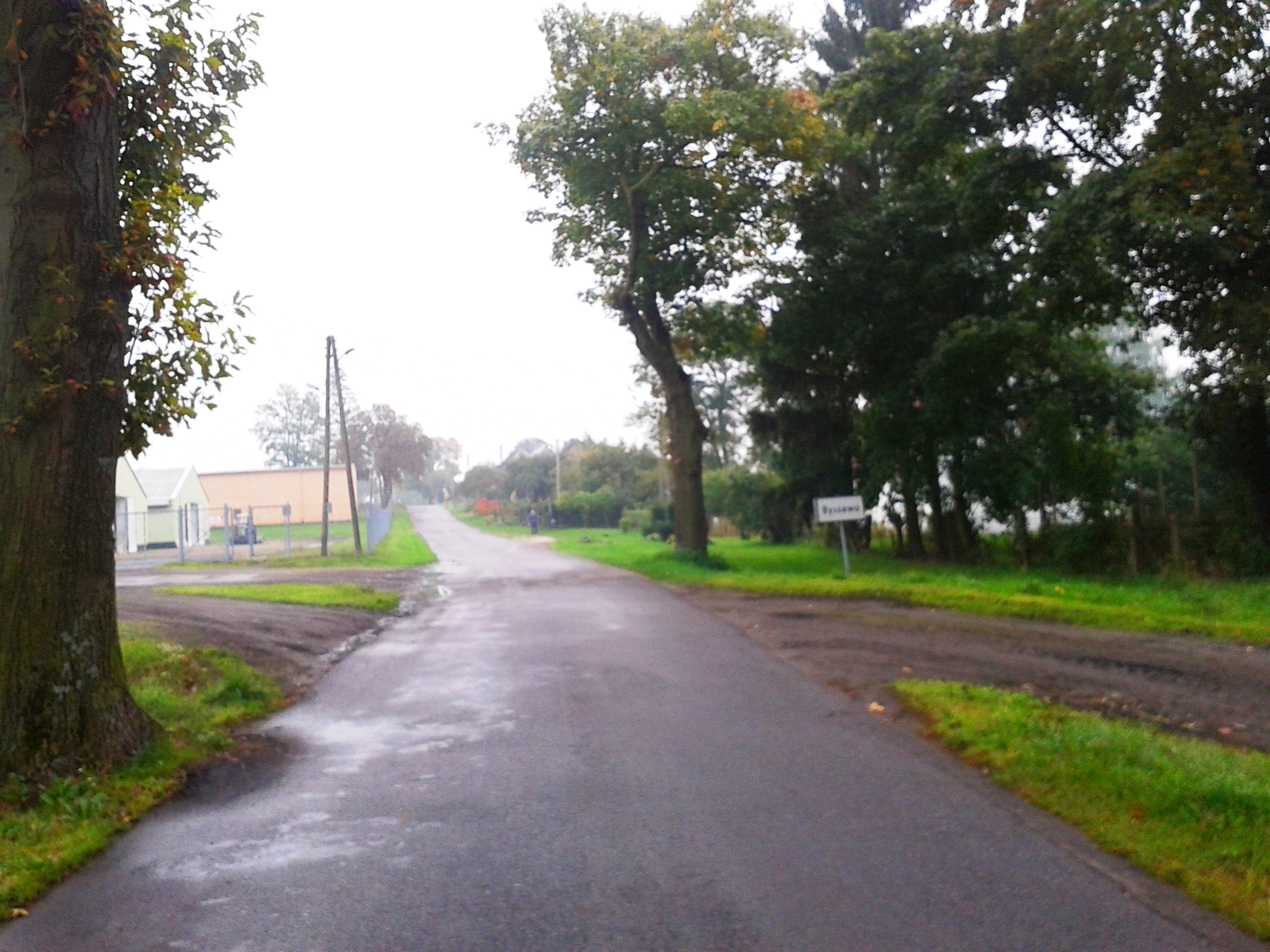
- Byszewo

- Location within Poland
- Coordinates: 53°40′39″N 15°40′26″E
- Country: Poland
- Voivodeship: West Pomeranian
- County: Łobez
- Gmina: Łobez

Byszewo [bɨˈʂɛvɔ] is a settlement in the administrative district of Gmina Łobez, within Łobez County, West Pomeranian Voivodeship, in north-western Poland.

For the history of the region, see History of Pomerania.
