= Zdzisławice, West Pomeranian Voivodeship =

Zdzisławice
- Settlement
- Location within Poland
- Coordinates: 53°39′28″N 15°43′18″E
- Country: Poland
- Voivodeship: West Pomeranian
- County: Łobez
- Gmina: Łobez

Zdzisławice [ʑd͡ʑiswaˈvit͡sɛ] (German: Christinenhof) is a settlement in the administrative district of Gmina Łobez, within Łobez County, West Pomeranian Voivodeship, in north-western Poland.

For the history of the region, see History of Pomerania.
