= Wysiedle =

- Village
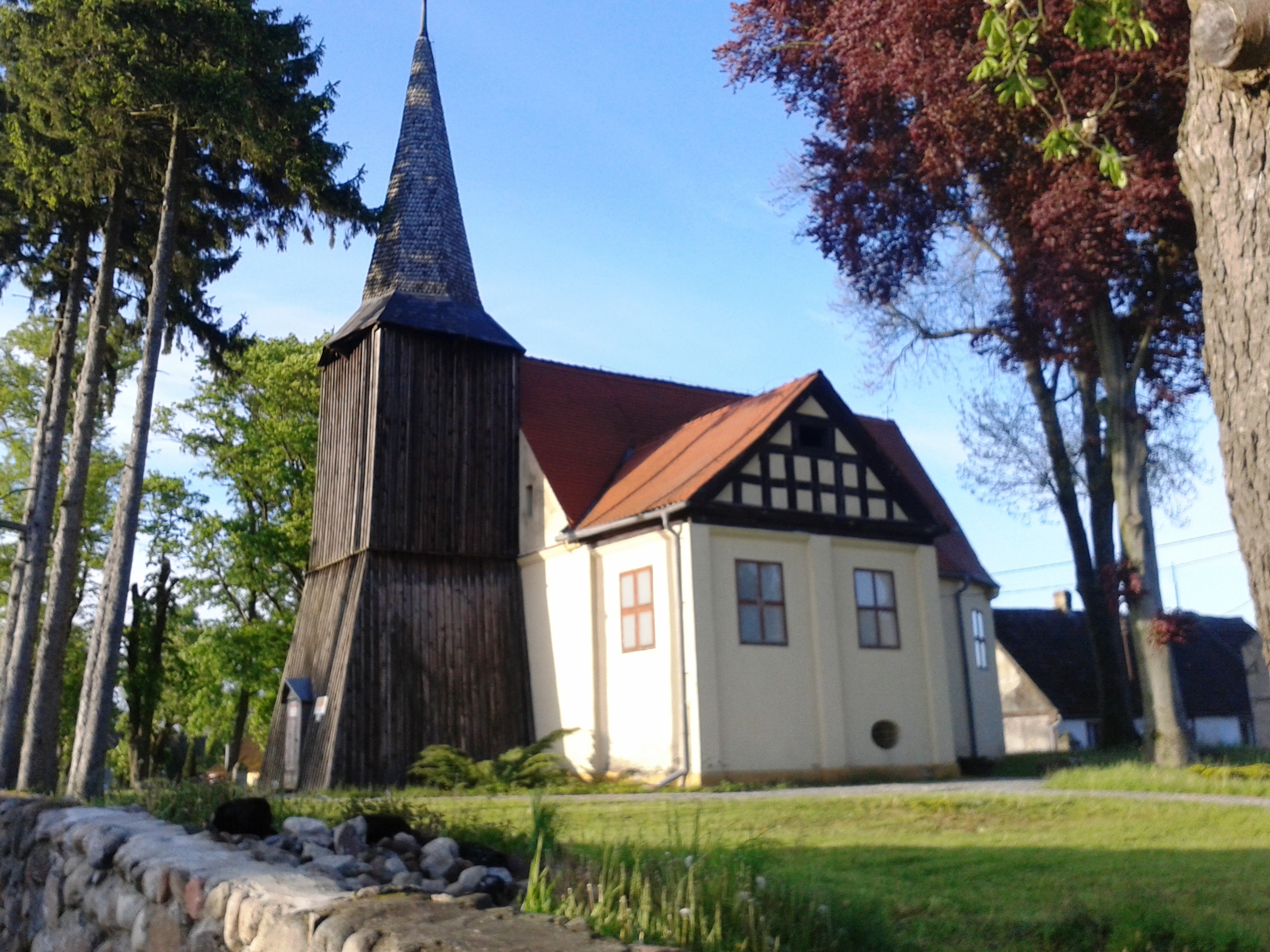
- Wysiedle - church

- Location within Poland
- Coordinates: 53°37′N 15°40′E
- Country: Poland
- Voivodeship: West Pomeranian
- County: Łobez
- Gmina: Łobez

Wysiedle [vɨˈɕɛdlɛ] (German: Woitzel) is a village in the administrative district of Gmina Łobez, within Łobez County, West Pomeranian Voivodeship, in north-western Poland. It lies approximately 4 km (2 mi) south-east of Łobez and 76 km (47 mi) east of the regional capital Szczecin.

For the history of the region, see History of Pomerania.
