= Zachełmie, West Pomeranian Voivodeship =

Zachełmie
- Village
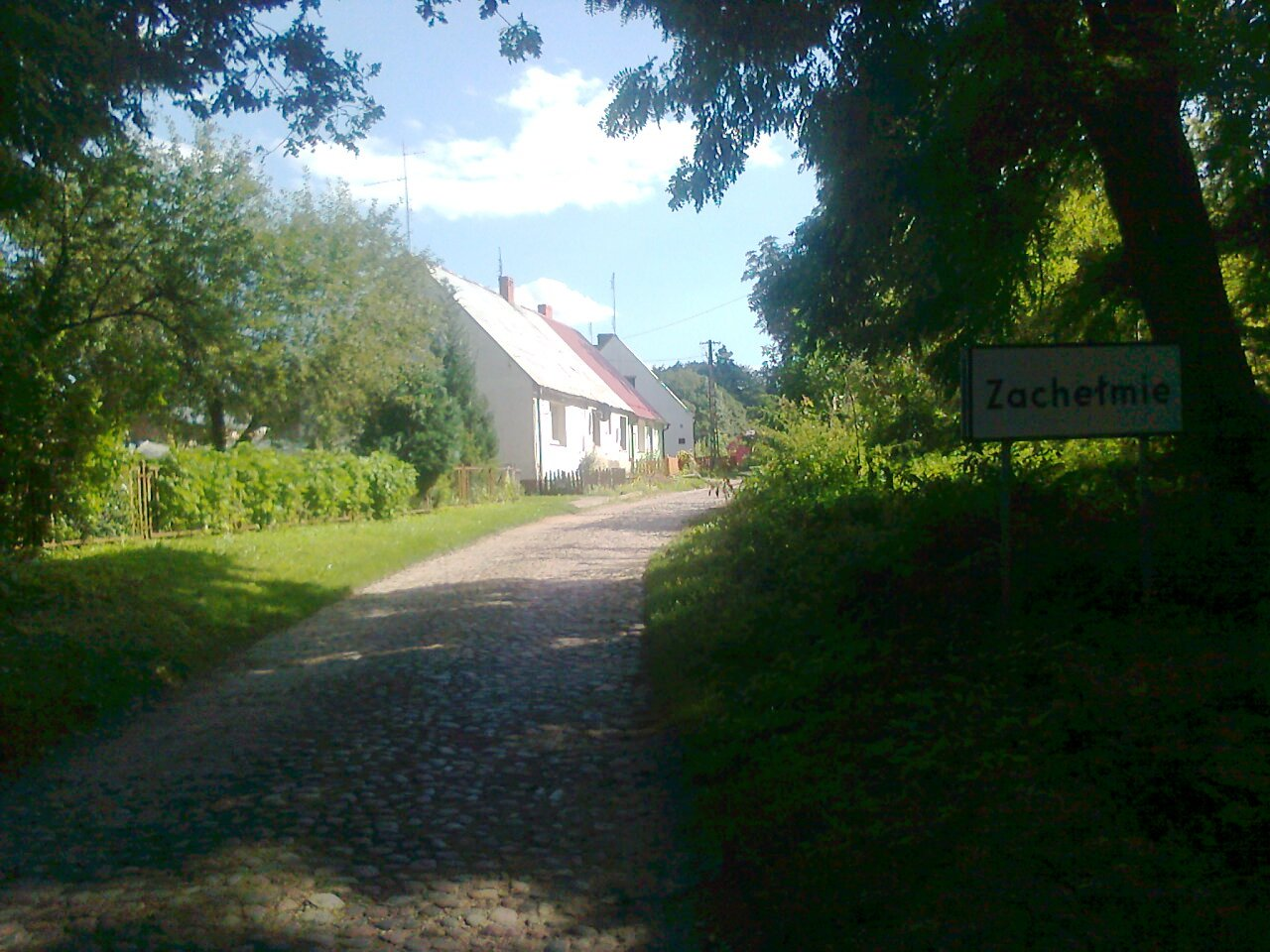
- Zachełmie

- Location within Poland
- Coordinates: 53°38′7″N 15°32′29″E
- Country: Poland
- Voivodeship: West Pomeranian
- County: Łobez
- Gmina: Łobez
- Population: 70

Zachełmie [zaˈxɛwmʲɛ] is a village in the administrative district of Gmina Łobez, within Łobez County, West Pomeranian Voivodeship, in north-western Poland. It lies approximately 5 km (3 mi) west of Łobez and 68 km (42 mi) east of the regional capital Szczecin.

For the history of the region, see History of Pomerania.

The village has a population of 70.
