= Unimie =

- Village
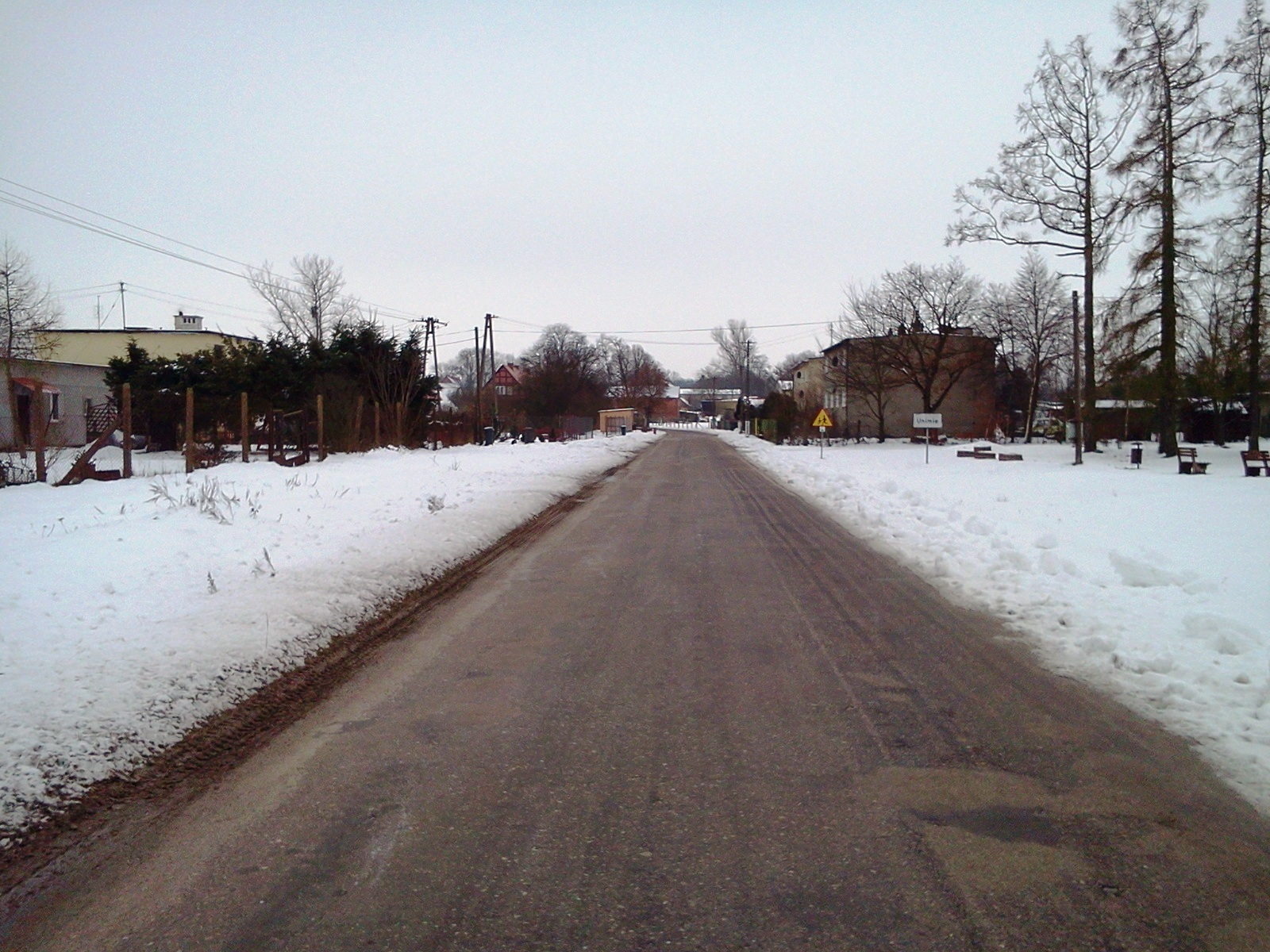
- Unimie

- Location within Poland
- Coordinates: 53°37′N 15°33′E
- Country: Poland
- Voivodeship: West Pomeranian
- County: Łobez
- Gmina: Łobez

Unimie [uˈɲimʲɛ] (German: Unheim) is a village in the administrative district of Gmina Łobez, within Łobez County, West Pomeranian Voivodeship, in north-western Poland. It lies approximately 5 km (3 mi) south-west of Łobez and 68 km (42 mi) east of the regional capital Szczecin.

For the history of the region, see History of Pomerania.
