= Worowo =

- Village
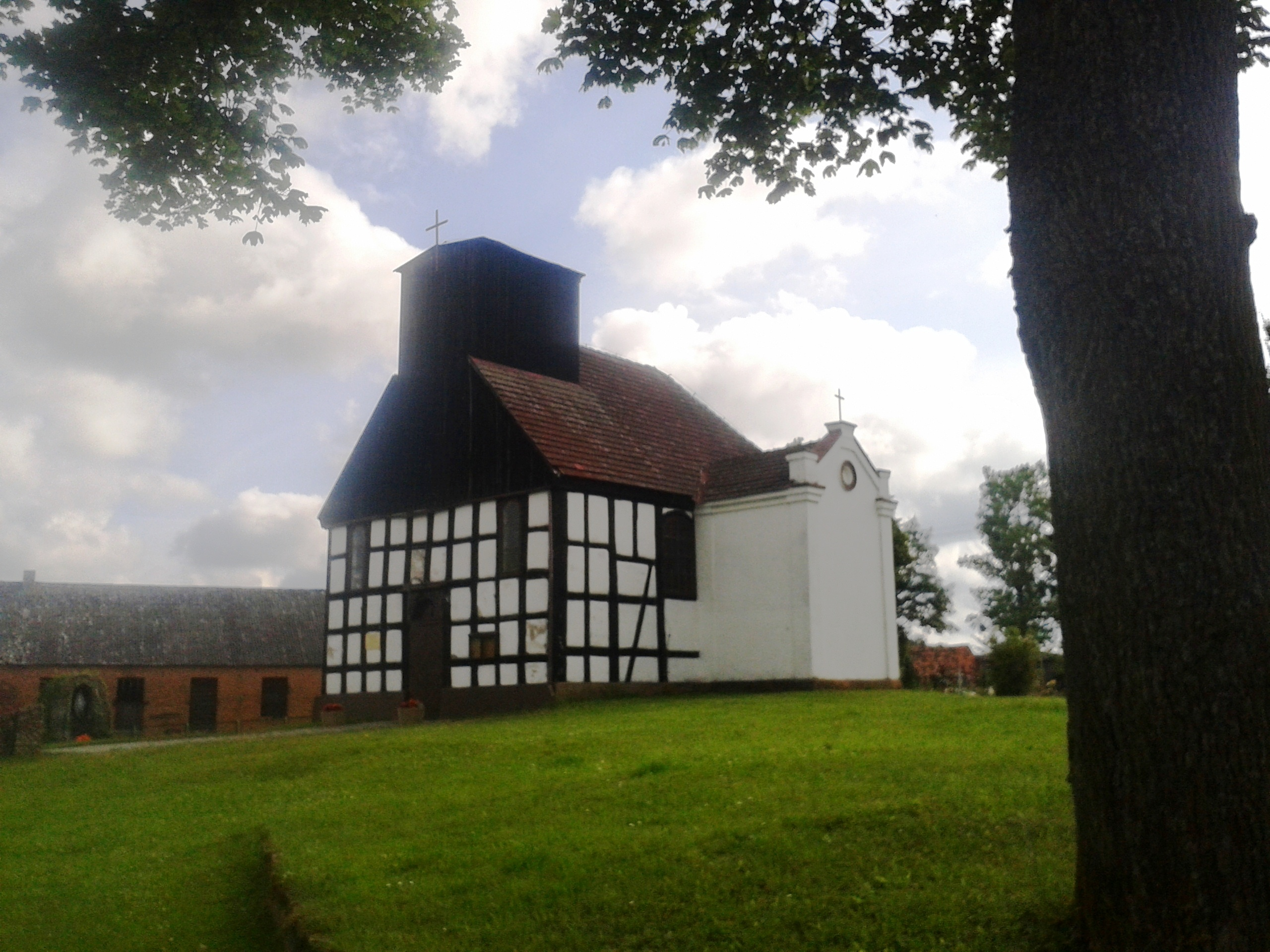
- Church (1707) (p.w. Imienia Marii)

- Location within Poland
- Coordinates: 53°41′55″N 15°38′43″E
- Country: Poland
- Voivodeship: West Pomeranian
- County: Łobez
- Gmina: Łobez

Worowo [vɔˈrɔvɔ] is a village in the administrative district of Gmina Łobez, within Łobez County, West Pomeranian Voivodeship, in north-western Poland. It lies approximately 8 km (5 mi) north of Łobez and 77 km (48 mi) north-east of the regional capital Szczecin.

For the history of the region, see History of Pomerania.

== See also ==
- History of Pomerania
