= Poradz, Łobez County =

Poradz
- Village
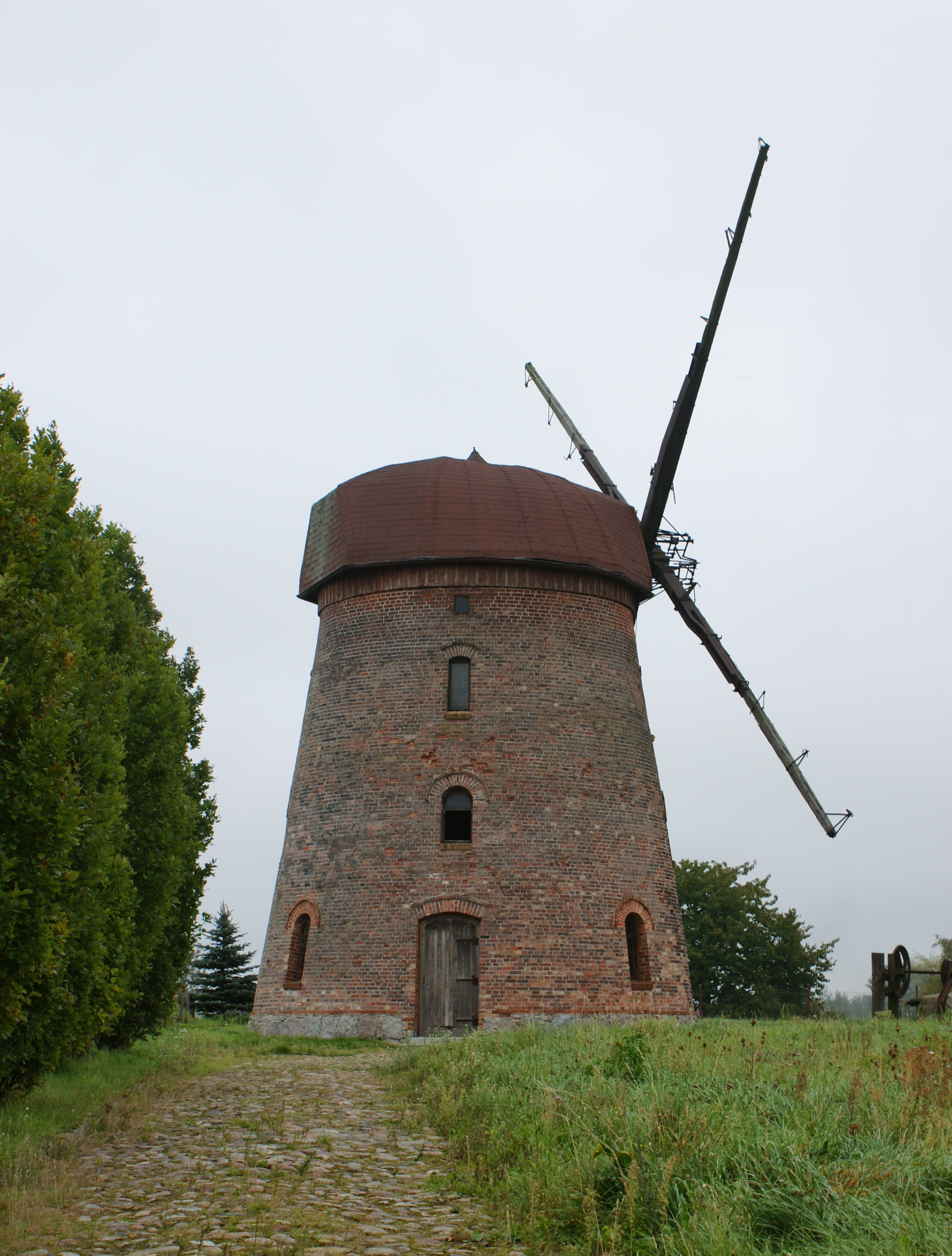
- Poradz - windmill

- Location within Poland
- Coordinates: 53°42′07″N 15°36′28″E
- Country: Poland
- Voivodeship: West Pomeranian
- County: Łobez
- Gmina: Łobez

Poradz [ˈpɔrat͡s] is a village in the administrative district of Gmina Łobez, within Łobez County, West Pomeranian Voivodeship, in north-western Poland.

For the history of the region, see History of Pomerania.
