= Tarnowo, Łobez County =

Tarnowo
- Village
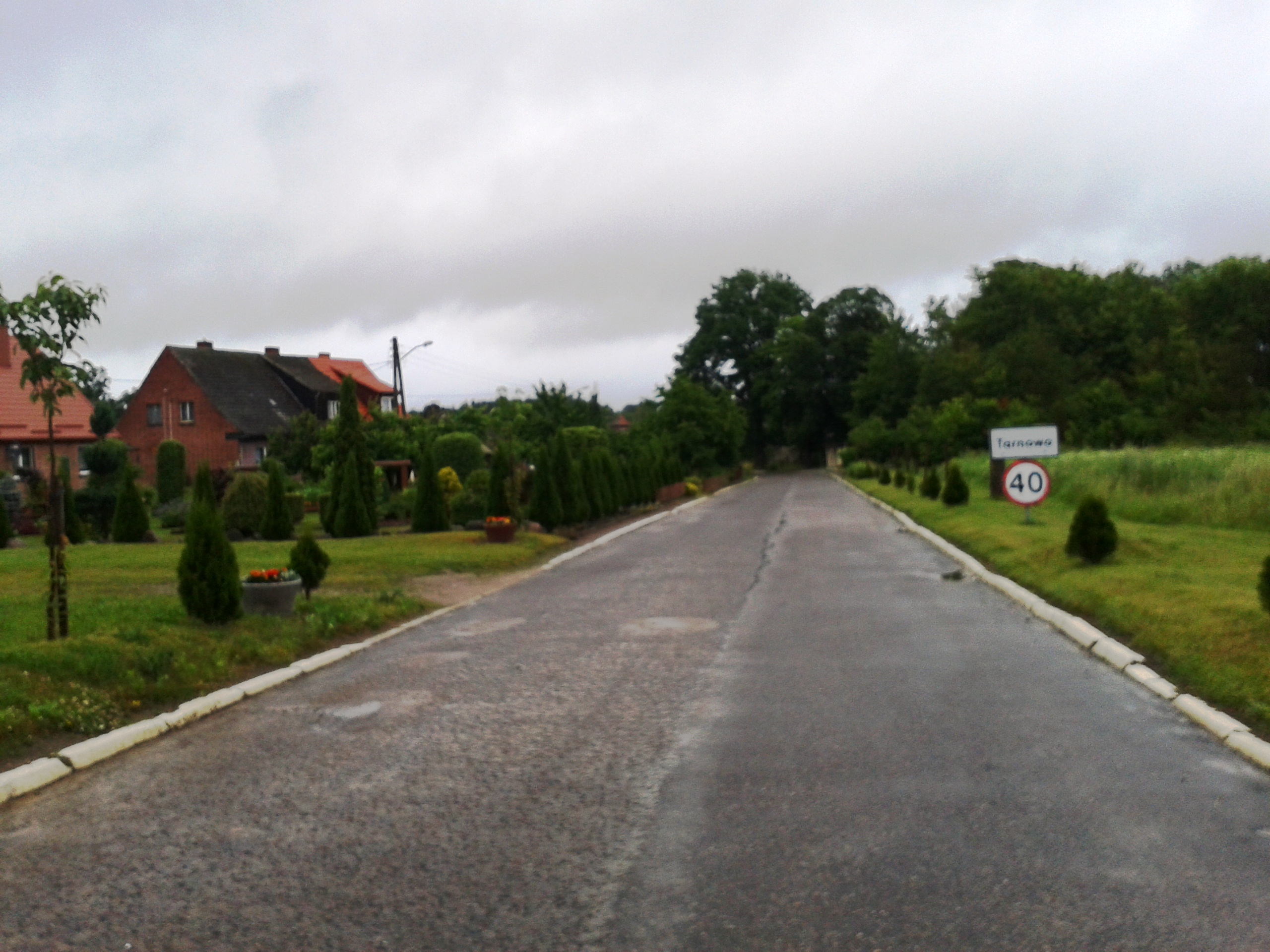
- Tarnowo

- Location within Poland
- Coordinates: 53°40′N 15°44′E
- Country: Poland
- Voivodeship: West Pomeranian
- County: Łobez
- Gmina: Łobez

Tarnowo [tarˈnɔvɔ] is a village in the administrative district of Gmina Łobez, within Łobez County, West Pomeranian Voivodeship, in north-western Poland. It lies approximately 9 km (6 mi) north-east of Łobez and 81 km (50 mi) east of the regional capital Szczecin.

For the history of the region, see History of Pomerania.
