= Rynowo, West Pomeranian Voivodeship =

Rynowo
- Village
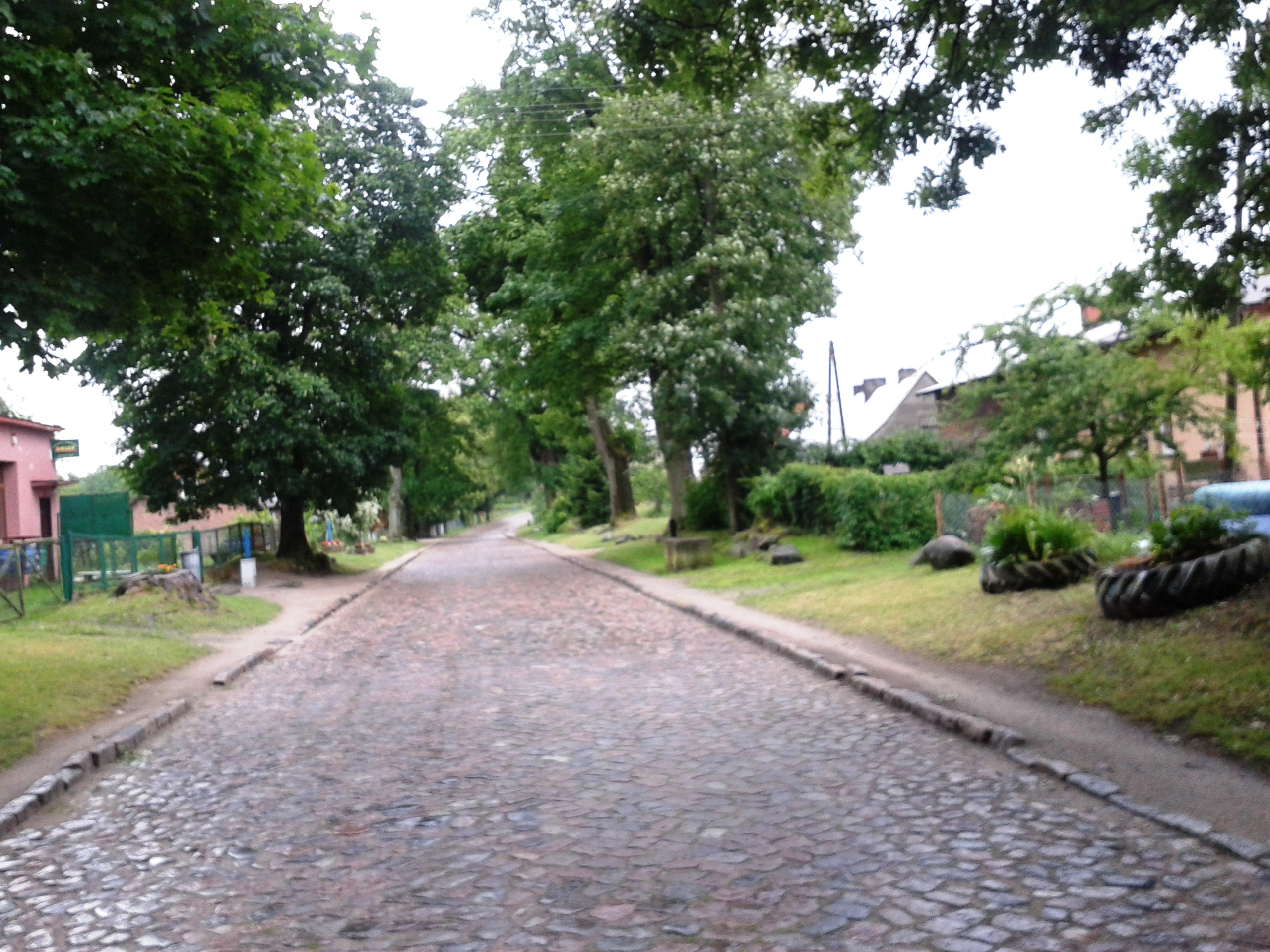
- Rynowo

- Location within Poland
- Coordinates: 53°39′N 15°45′E
- Country: Poland
- Voivodeship: West Pomeranian
- County: Łobez
- Gmina: Łobez

Rynowo [rɨˈnɔvɔ] (German: Rienow) is a village in the administrative district of Gmina Łobez, within Łobez County, West Pomeranian Voivodeship, in north-western Poland. It lies approximately 9 km (6 mi) east of Łobez and 82 km (51 mi) east of the regional capital Szczecin.
