= Przyborze, West Pomeranian Voivodeship =

Przyborze
- Village
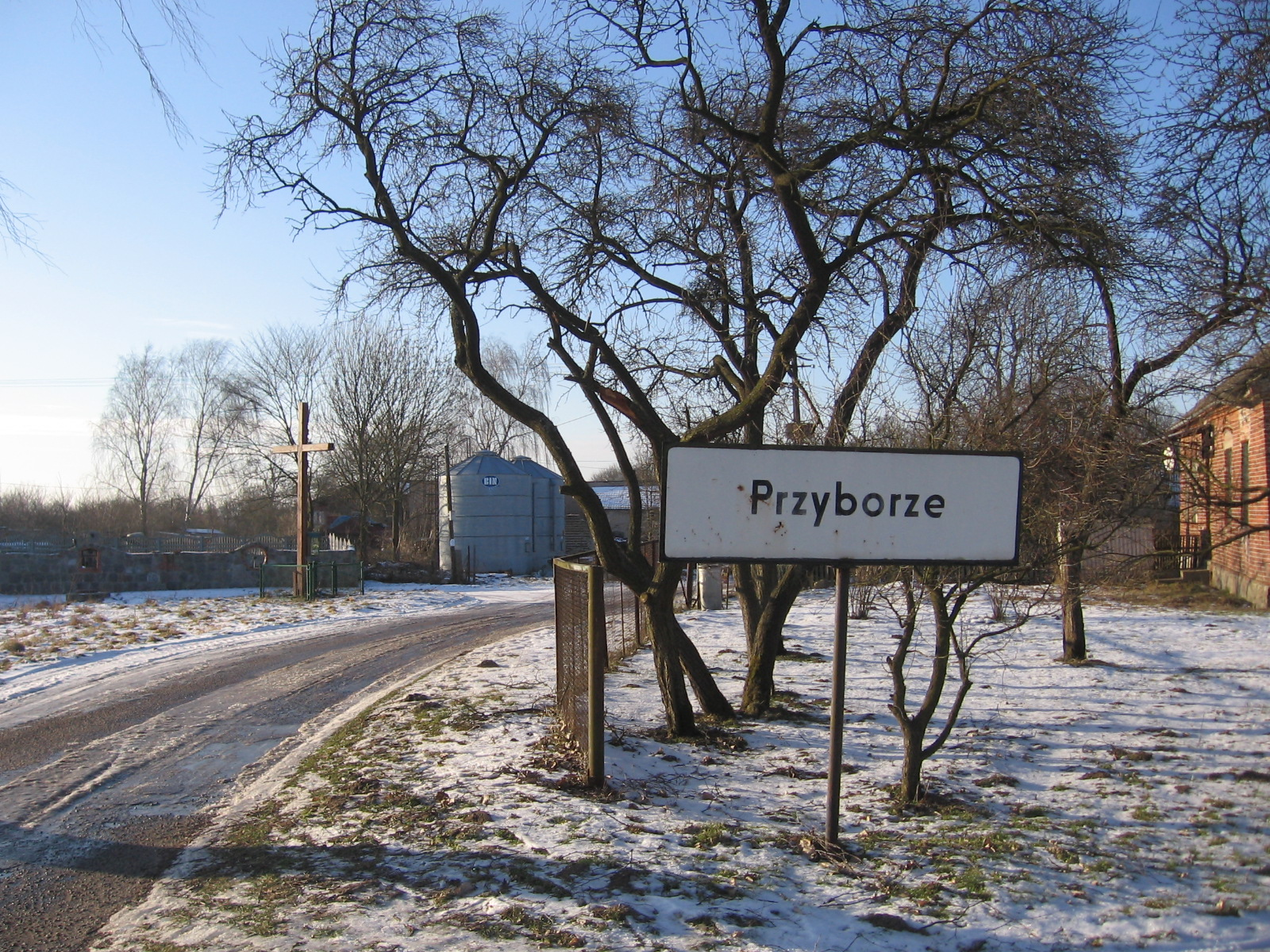
- Entrance to the village of Przyborze

- Location within Poland
- Coordinates: 53°41′0″N 15°35′0″E
- Country: Poland
- Voivodeship: West Pomeranian
- County: Łobez
- Gmina: Łobez
- Established: Middle Ages

Government
  - Sołtys: Grażyna Mądraszek (for Dalno)
- Elevation: 104 m (341 ft)
- Population: 40
- Time zone: UTC+1 (CET)
  - Summer (DST): UTC+2 (CEST)
- Postal code: 73-150
- Area code: +48 91
- Car Plates: ZLO

Przyborze [pʂɨˈbɔʐɛ] (German: Piepenhagen) is a village in Poland, in West Pomeranian Voivodeship, in Łobez County, in Gmina Łobez. It lies approximately 7 kilometres (4 miles) from Łobez.

Przyborze lies on a hill with the steep slopes (the difference between the highest and the lowest point is 50 m). The entry into the village is an avenue with trees - birches, clones and willows. It is connected with a 148. voivodeship road, which leads into peripheral streets of Łobez (Nowe Osiedle street).

The documents for the first time mention Przyborze in the 16th century. From the Middle Ages to the 19th century the village was a fiefdom of Borcke family. In 1945 its owners was Rohrschneider family.

On the outskirts of Przyborze there is an old Evangelical-Augsburg cemetery from 19th century, where ancient iron crosses are preserved (the oldest is from 1862). The oldest grave of a landsowner Carl Gottlib is from 1858. The cemetery is also known for the common ivy, which grows on the trees and its stems are thick as an arm of an adult human.

Around the city there are also cliffs near the Rega river, up to 50 meters high. In the south of residential buildings lies a stone with a diameter of 9.1 m, brought here from Scandinavia one thousand years ago.

From 1975 to 1998 Przyborze was a part of Szczecin Voivodeship.
