= Dobieszewo, West Pomeranian Voivodeship =

Dobieszewo
- Village
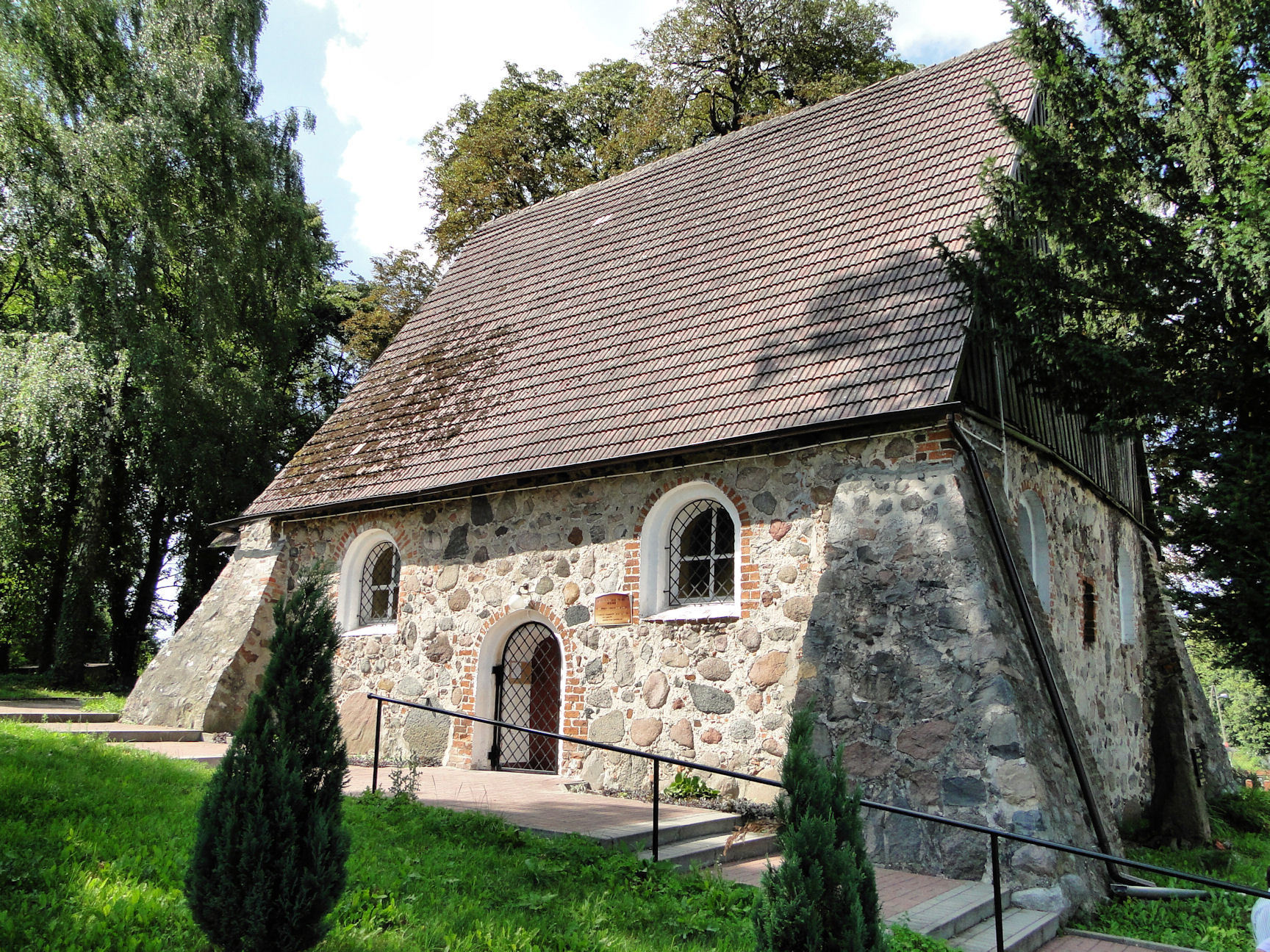
- Dobieszewo - church

- Location within Poland
- Coordinates: 53°36′N 15°32′E
- Country: Poland
- Voivodeship: West Pomeranian
- County: Łobez
- Gmina: Łobez
- Elevation: 88 m (289 ft)
- Population: 141

Dobieszewo [dɔbʲɛˈʂɛvɔ] is a village in the administrative district of Gmina Łobez, within Łobez County, West Pomeranian Voivodeship, in north-western Poland. It lies approximately 7 km (4 mi) south-west of Łobez and 67 km (42 mi) east of the regional capital Szczecin.

For the history of the region, see History of Pomerania.

The village has a population of 141.
