= Gmina Łobez =

Gmina Łobez Łobez Commune
- Gmina
- Flag Coat of arms
- Interactive map of Gmina Łobez
- Coordinates (Łobez): 53°38′N 15°37′E
- Country: Poland
- Voivodeship: West Pomeranian
- County: Łobez
- Seat: Łobez

Area
  - Total: 228 km^{2} (88 sq mi)

Population (2014)
  - Total: 14,345
  - Density: 62.9/km^{2} (163/sq mi)
  - Urban: 10 440
  - Rural: 3,905
- Website: http://www.lobez.pl/

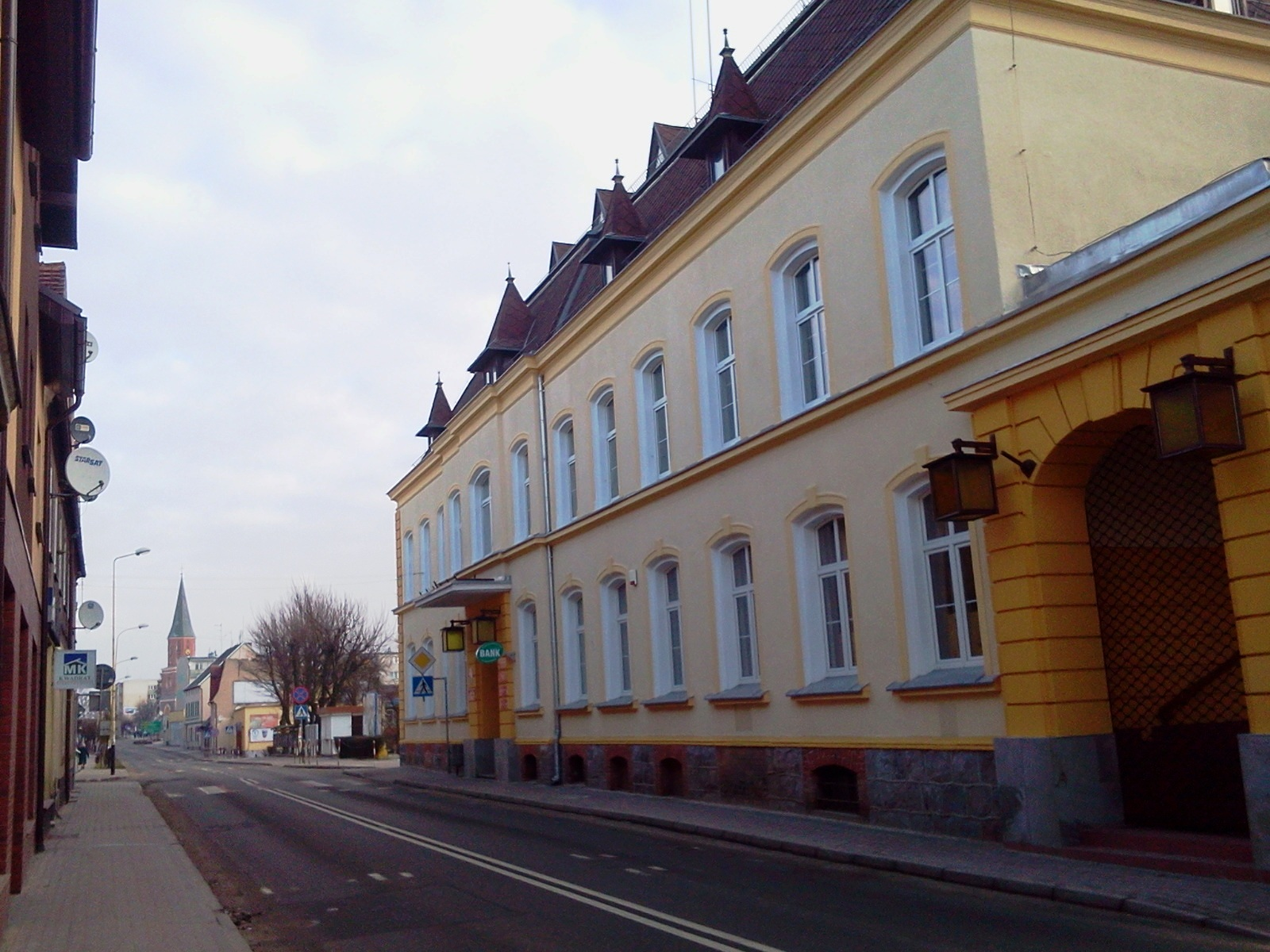
Commune office

Gmina Łobez is an urban-rural gmina (administrative district) in Łobez County, West Pomeranian Voivodeship, in north-western Poland. Its seat is the town of Łobez, which lies approximately 73 kilometres (45 mi) east of the regional capital Szczecin.

The gmina covers an area of 227.68 square kilometres (87.9 sq mi), As of 2014 its total population is 14,345 (out of which the population of Łobez amounts to 10,440, and the population of the rural part of the gmina is 3,905).

== Villages ==
Apart from the town of Łobez, Gmina Łobez contains the villages and settlements of Bełczna, Bonin, Budziszcze, Byszewo, Dalno, Dobieszewo, Grabowo, Karwowo, Klępnica, Kołdrąb, Łobżany, Meszne, Niegrzebia, Polakowo, Pomorzany, Poradz, Prusinowo, Przyborze, Rożnowo Łobeskie, Rynowo, Rynowo-Kolonia, Suliszewice, Tarnowo, Trzeszczyna, Unimie, Worowo, Wysiedle, Zachełmie, Zagórzyce, Zajezierze, Zakrzyce and Zdzisławice.

== Neighbouring gminas ==
Gmina Łobez is bordered by the gminas of Brzeżno, Drawsko Pomorskie, Radowo Małe, Resko, Świdwin and Węgorzyno.
