= Rożnowo Łobeskie =

- Village
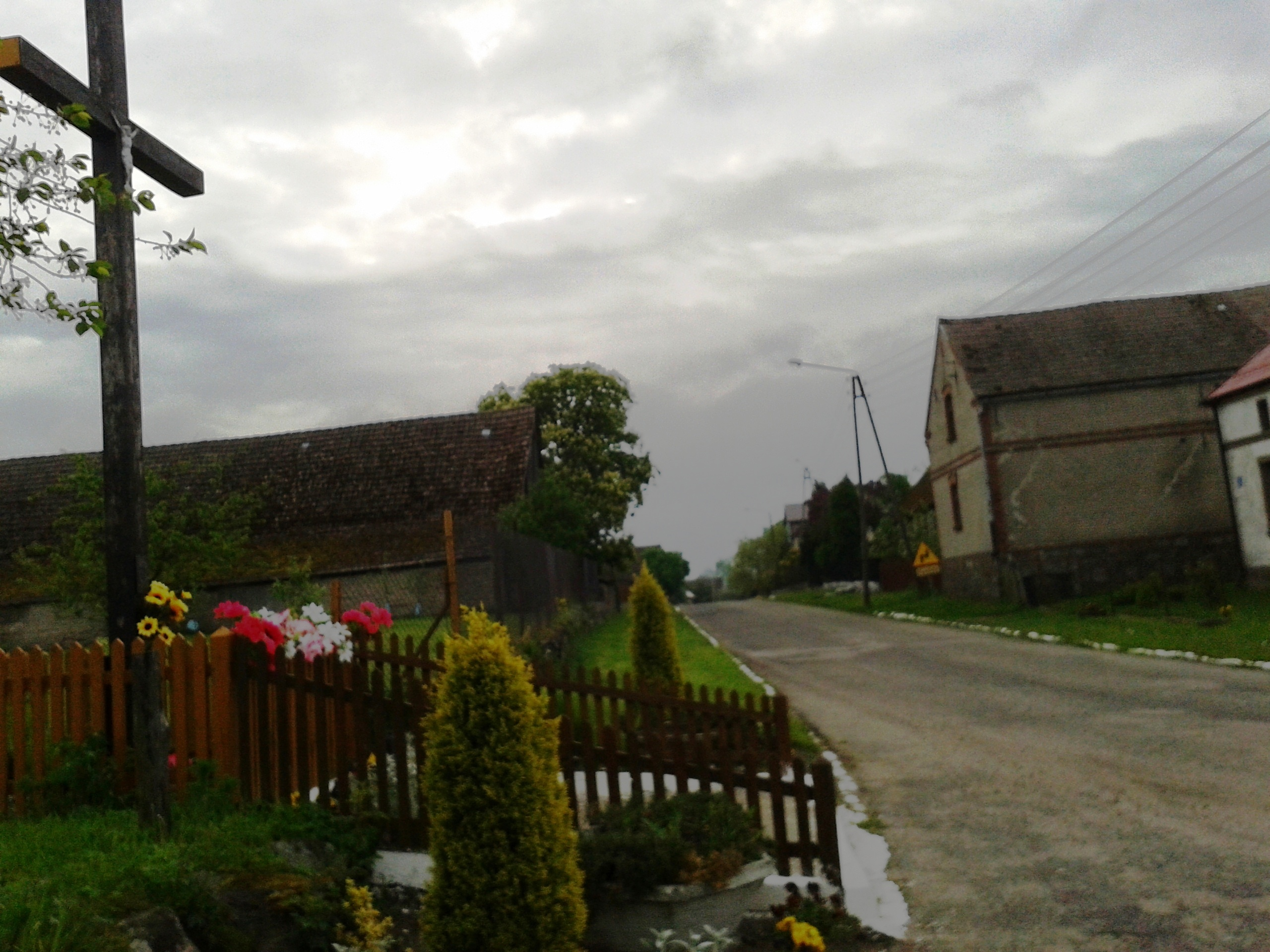
- Rożnowo Łobeskie

- Location within Poland
- Coordinates: 53°37′22″N 15°45′24″E
- Country: Poland
- Voivodeship: West Pomeranian
- County: Łobez
- Gmina: Łobez

Rożnowo Łobeskie [rɔʐˈnɔvɔ wɔˈbɛskʲɛ] is a village in the administrative district of Gmina Łobez, within Łobez County, West Pomeranian Voivodeship, in north-western Poland.

For the history of the region, see History of Pomerania.
