= Prusinowo, Łobez County =

Prusinowo
- Village
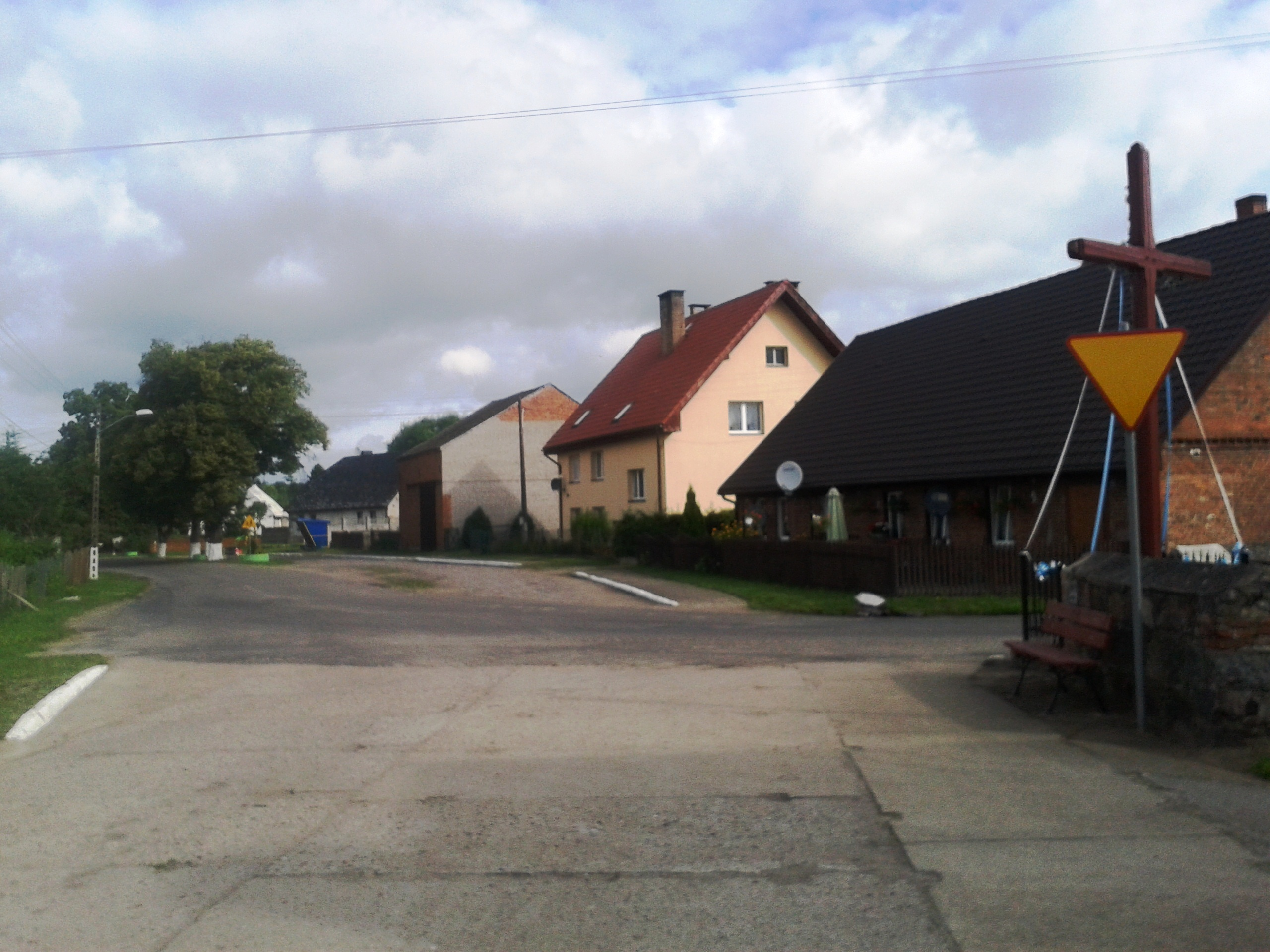
- Prusinowo - gmina Łobez

- Location within Poland
- Coordinates: 53°41′N 15°36′E
- Country: Poland
- Voivodeship: West Pomeranian
- County: Łobez
- Gmina: Łobez

Prusinowo [pruɕiˈnɔvɔ] (German: Prütznow) is a village in the administrative district of Gmina Łobez, within Łobez County, West Pomeranian Voivodeship, in north-western Poland. It lies approximately 6 km (4 mi) north of Łobez and 74 km (46 mi) north-east of the regional capital Szczecin.
