= Karwowo, Łobez County =

Karwowo
- Village
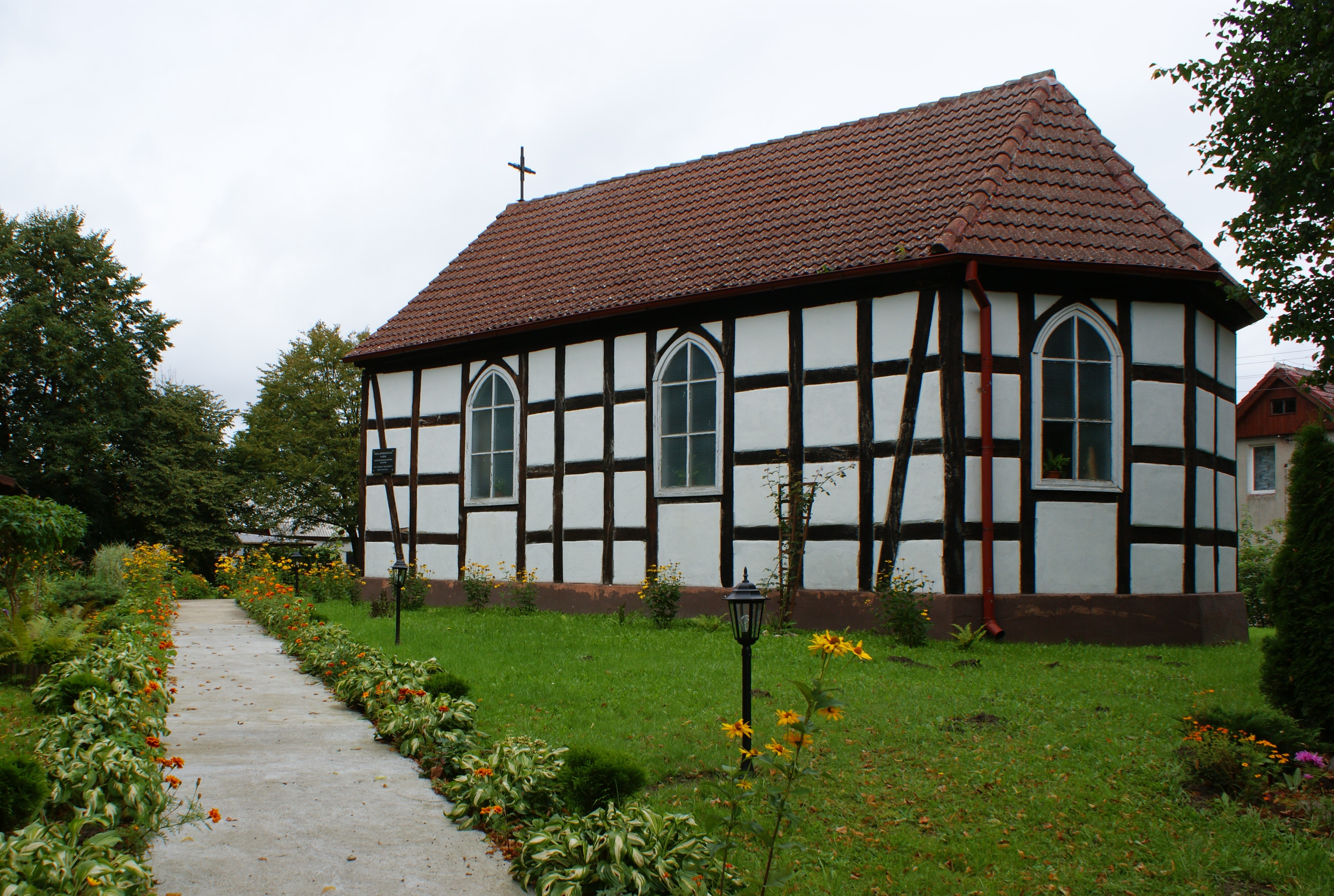
- Karwowo - church

- Location within Poland
- Coordinates: 53°41′N 15°32′E
- Country: Poland
- Voivodeship: West Pomeranian
- County: Łobez
- Gmina: Łobez
- Elevation: 107 m (351 ft)
- Population: 157

Karwowo [karˈvɔvɔ] (German: Karow) is a village in the administrative district of Gmina Łobez, within Łobez County, West Pomeranian Voivodeship, in north-western Poland. It lies approximately 8 km (5 mi) north-west of Łobez and 70 km (43 mi) north-east of the regional capital Szczecin.
