= Dalno =

- Village
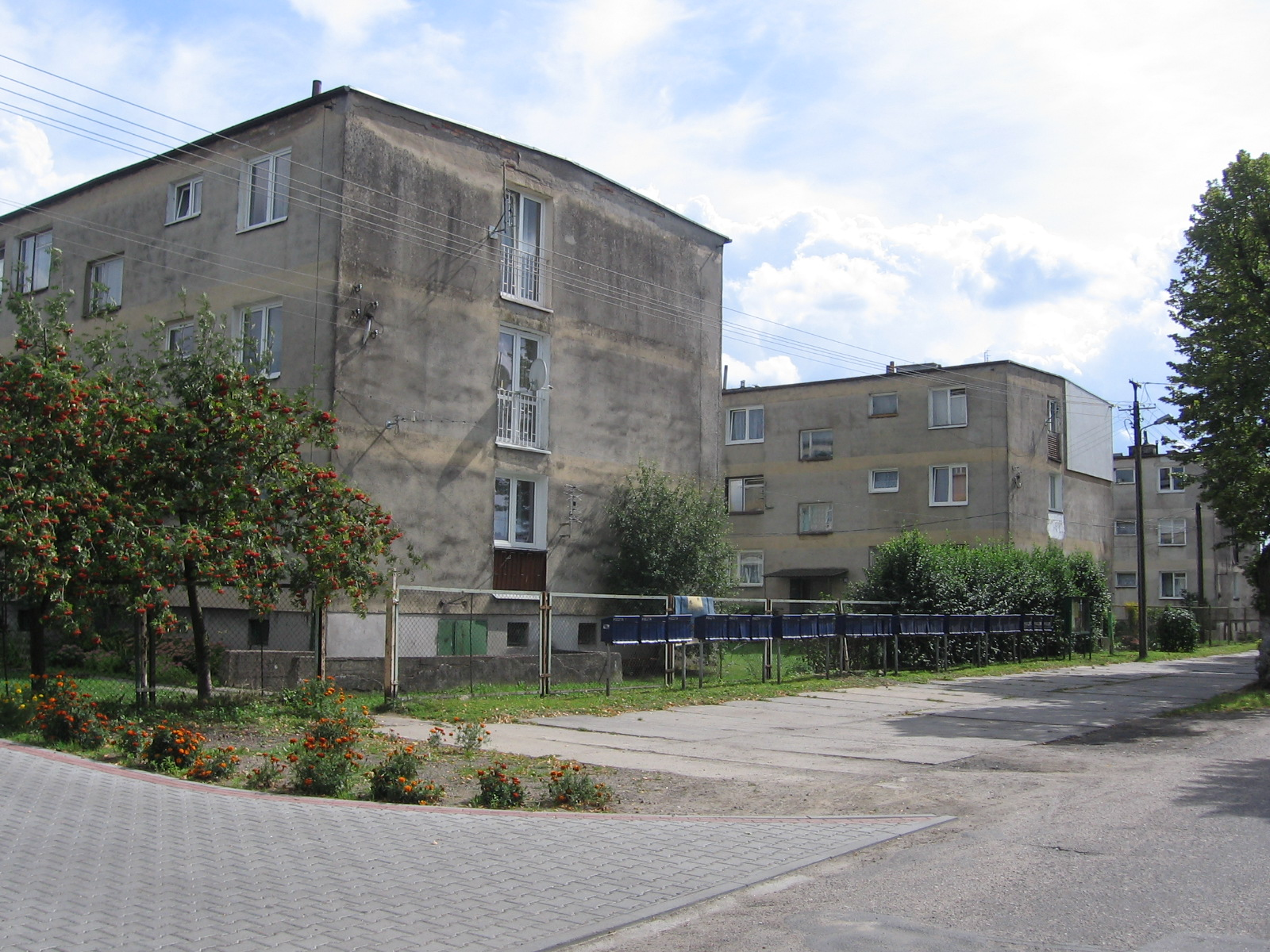
- Dalno - residential blocks

- Location within Poland
- Coordinates: 53°39′31″N 15°35′21″E
- Country: Poland
- Voivodeship: West Pomeranian
- County: Łobez
- Gmina: Łobez
- Elevation: 100 m (330 ft)
- Population: 450

Dalno [ˈdalnɔ] is a village in the administrative district of Gmina Łobez, within Łobez County, West Pomeranian Voivodeship, in north-western Poland.

The village has a population of 450.
