= Boniewo =

Boniewo refers to the following places in Poland:

- Boniewo, Kuyavian-Pomeranian Voivodeship
- Boniewo, Lublin Voivodeship
- Gmina Boniewo, rural gmina (administrative district) in Poland
