= Sułków =

Sułków may refer to:

- Sułków, Lower Silesian Voivodeship (south-west Poland)
- Sułków, Lesser Poland Voivodeship (south Poland)
- Sułków, Masovian Voivodeship (east-central Poland)
- Sułków, Opole Voivodeship (south-west Poland)
- Sułków, Końskie County in Świętokrzyskie Voivodeship (south-central Poland)
- Sułków, Włoszczowa County in Świętokrzyskie Voivodeship (south-central Poland)

== See also ==
- Sułkowo (disambiguation)
- Sułkówek
