= Dobrkowo =

- Village
- Location within Poland
- Coordinates: 53°36′43″N 15°19′46″E
- Country: Poland
- Voivodeship: West Pomeranian
- County: Łobez
- Gmina: Radowo Małe

Dobrkowo [dɔbrˈkɔvɔ] (German: Daberkow) is a village in the administrative district of Gmina Radowo Małe, within Łobez County, West Pomeranian Voivodeship, in north-western Poland. It lies approximately 10 km (6 mi) south-west of Radowo Małe, 20 km (12 mi) west of Łobez, and 54 km (34 mi) north-east of the regional capital Szczecin.
