= Czachowo, West Pomeranian Voivodeship =

Czachowo
- Village
- Location within Poland
- Coordinates: 53°39′17″N 15°28′53″E
- Country: Poland
- Voivodeship: West Pomeranian
- County: Łobez
- Gmina: Radowo Małe
- Population (approx.): 100

Czachowo [t͡ʂaˈxɔvɔ] (German: Zachow) is a village in the administrative district of Gmina Radowo Małe, within Łobez County, West Pomeranian Voivodeship, in north-western Poland. It lies approximately 3 km (2 mi) east of Radowo Małe, 10 km (6 mi) west of Łobez, and 66 km (41 mi) north-east of the regional capital Szczecin.

The village has an approximate population of 100.
