= Borkowo Wielkie, West Pomeranian Voivodeship =

Borkowo Wielkie
- Village
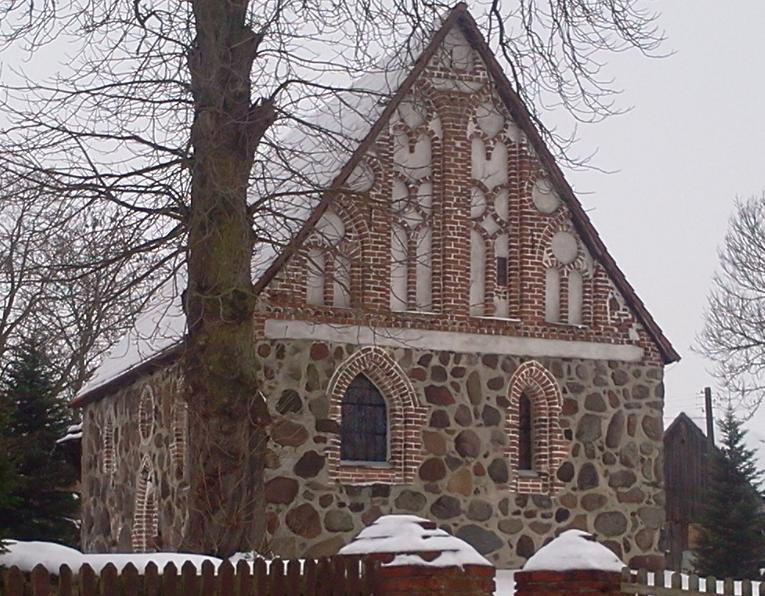
- Borkowo Wielkie - church of St. John the Apostle

- Location within Poland
- Coordinates: 53°38′N 15°27′E
- Country: Poland
- Voivodeship: West Pomeranian
- County: Łobez
- Gmina: Radowo Małe

Borkowo Wielkie [bɔrˈkɔvɔ ˈvjɛlkʲɛ] (German: Groß Borckenhagen) is a village in the administrative district of Gmina Radowo Małe, within Łobez County, West Pomeranian Voivodeship, in north-western Poland. It lies approximately 2 km (1 mi) south of Radowo Małe, 12 km (7 mi) west of Łobez, and 63 km (39 mi) north-east of the regional capital Szczecin.
