= Radzim, West Pomeranian Voivodeship =

Radzim
- Village
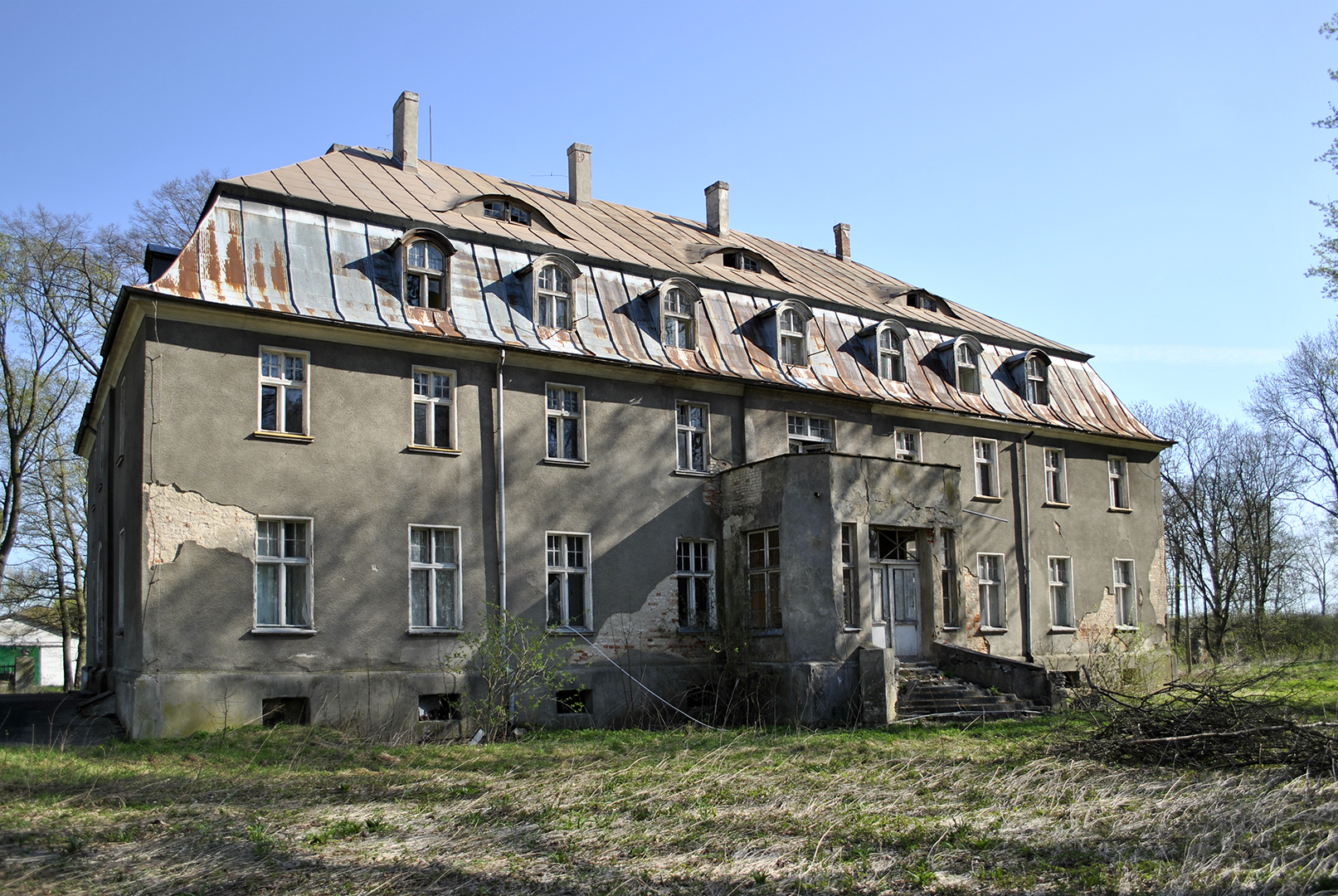
- Radzim Palace

- Location within Poland
- Coordinates: 53°40′21″N 15°17′38″E
- Country: Poland
- Voivodeship: West Pomeranian
- County: Łobez
- Gmina: Radowo Małe

Population
  - Total: 120
- Time zone: UTC+1 (CET)
  - Summer (DST): UTC+2 (CEST)
- Vehicle registration: ZLO

Radzim [ˈrad͡ʑim] is a village in the administrative district of Gmina Radowo Małe, within Łobez County, West Pomeranian Voivodeship, in north-western Poland. It lies approximately 11 km (7 mi) west of Radowo Małe, 22 km (14 mi) west of Łobez, and 55 km (34 mi) north-east of the regional capital Szczecin.

It is located in the historic region of Pomerania.

The village has a population of 120.
