= Maliniec, West Pomeranian Voivodeship =

Maliniec
- Village
- Location within Poland
- Coordinates: 53°42′10″N 15°21′37″E
- Country: Poland
- Voivodeship: West Pomeranian
- County: Łobez
- Gmina: Radowo Małe
- Population: 150

Maliniec [maˈliɲɛt͡s] is a village in the administrative district of Gmina Radowo Małe, within Łobez County, West Pomeranian Voivodeship, in north-western Poland. It lies approximately 9 km (6 mi) north-west of Radowo Małe, 19 km (12 mi) north-west of Łobez, and 61 km (38 mi) north-east of the regional capital Szczecin.

The village has a population of 150.
