= Siedlice, Łobez County =

Siedlice
- Village
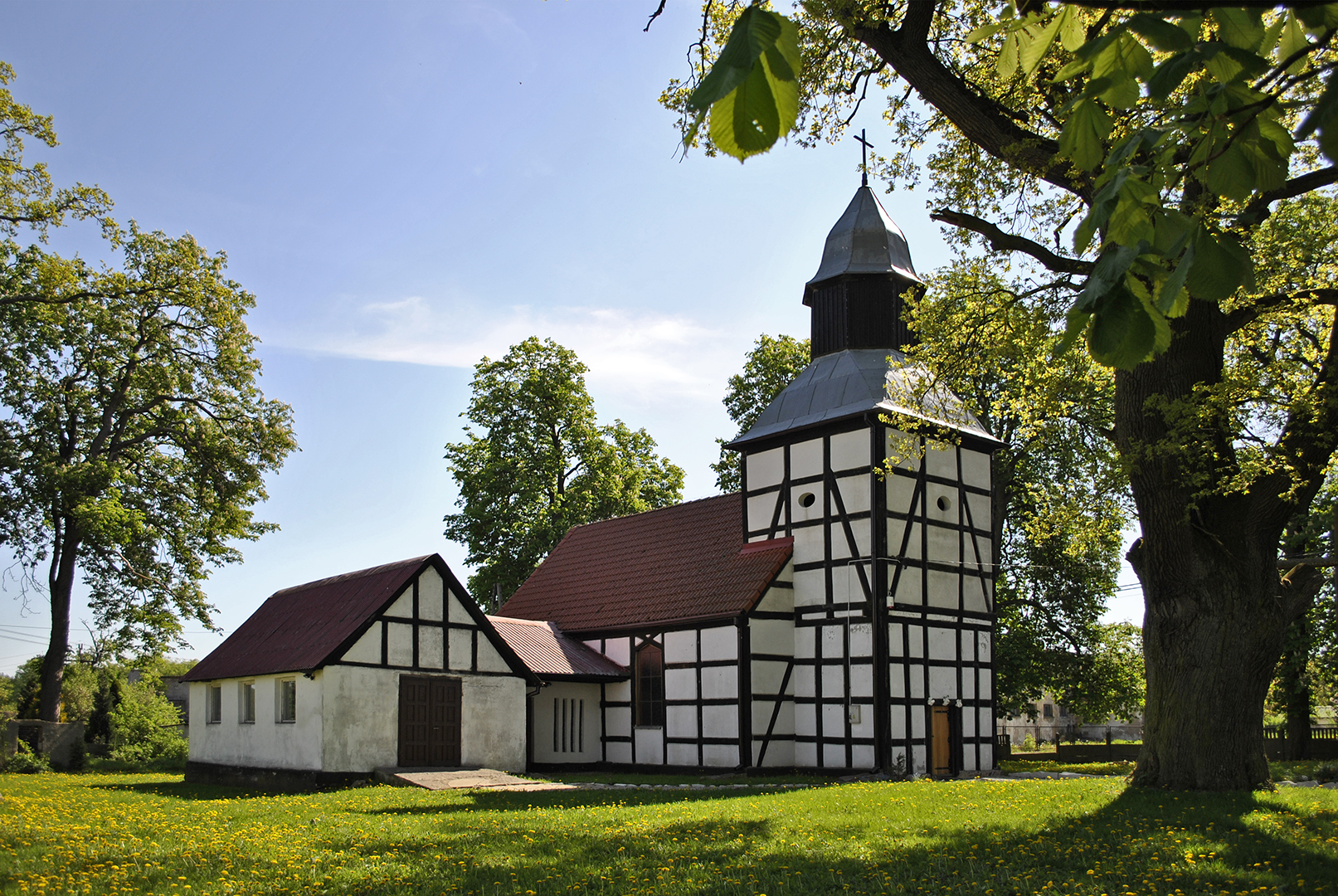
- Siedlice - church

- Location within Poland
- Coordinates: 53°36′47″N 15°29′12″E
- Country: Poland
- Voivodeship: West Pomeranian
- County: Łobez
- Gmina: Radowo Małe

Siedlice [ɕɛˈdlit͡sɛ] (German: Zeitlitz) is a village in the administrative district of Gmina Radowo Małe, within Łobez County, West Pomeranian Voivodeship, in north-western Poland. It lies approximately 5 km (3 mi) south-east of Radowo Małe, 9 km (6 mi) west of Łobez, and 64 km (40 mi) east of the regional capital Szczecin.

For the history of the region, see History of Pomerania.
