= Karnice, Łobez County =

Karnice
- Village
- Location within Poland
- Coordinates: 53°41′N 15°29′E
- Country: Poland
- Voivodeship: West Pomeranian
- County: Łobez
- Gmina: Radowo Małe

Karnice [karˈnit͡sɛ] (German: Karnitz) is a village in the administrative district of Gmina Radowo Małe, within Łobez County, West Pomeranian Voivodeship, in north-western Poland. It lies approximately 5 km (3 mi) north-east of Radowo Małe, 11 km (7 mi) north-west of Łobez, and 67 km (42 mi) north-east of the regional capital Szczecin.
