= Mołdawinek =

- Settlement
- Location within Poland
- Coordinates: 53°41′N 15°20′E
- Country: Poland
- Voivodeship: West Pomeranian
- County: Łobez
- Gmina: Radowo Małe
- Population: 14

Mołdawinek [mɔu̯daˈvinɛk] (German: Neu Maldewin) is a settlement in the administrative district of Gmina Radowo Małe, within Łobez County, West Pomeranian Voivodeship, in north-western Poland. It lies approximately 9 km (6 mi) north-west of Radowo Małe, 20 km (12 mi) west of Łobez, and 58 km (36 mi) north-east of the regional capital Szczecin.

For the history of the region, see History of Pomerania.

The settlement has a population of 14.
