= Troszczyno =

- Village
- Location within Poland
- Coordinates: 53°40′35″N 15°18′29″E
- Country: Poland
- Voivodeship: West Pomeranian
- County: Łobez
- Gmina: Radowo Małe

Troszczyno [trɔʂˈt͡ʂɨnɔ] (German: Friedrichsgnade) is a village in the administrative district of Gmina Radowo Małe, within Łobez County, West Pomeranian Voivodeship, in north-western Poland. It lies approximately 10 km (6 mi) west of Radowo Małe, 21 km (13 mi) west of Łobez, and 56 km (35 mi) north-east of the regional capital Szczecin.

== See also ==
History of Pomerania
