= Orle, Łobez County =

Orle
- Village
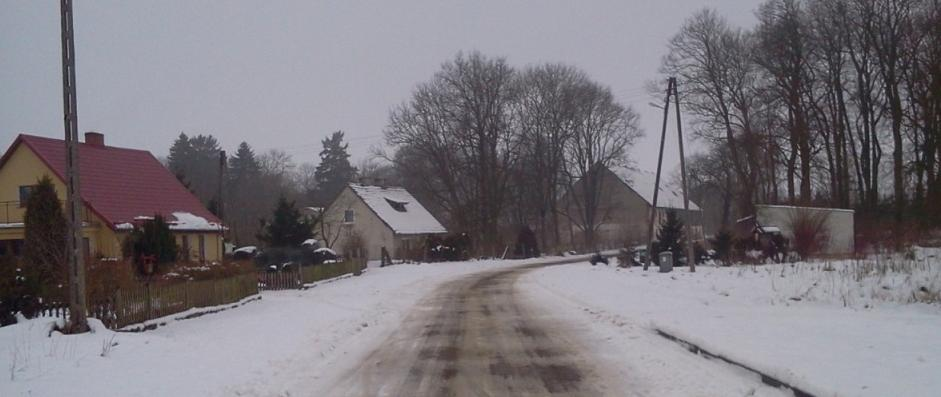
- Orle

- Location within Poland
- Coordinates: 53°38′9″N 15°24′19″E
- Country: Poland
- Voivodeship: West Pomeranian
- County: Łobez
- Gmina: Radowo Małe
- Population (approx.): 300

Orle [ˈɔrlɛ] (German: Haseleu) is a village in the administrative district of Gmina Radowo Małe, within Łobez County, West Pomeranian Voivodeship, in north-western Poland. It lies approximately 4 km (2 mi) south-west of Radowo Małe, 14 km (9 mi) west of Łobez, and 60 km (37 mi) north-east of the regional capital Szczecin.

For the history of the region, see History of Pomerania.

The village has an approximate population of 300.
