= Gostomin, West Pomeranian Voivodeship =

Gostomin
- Village
- Location within Poland
- Coordinates: 53°40′51″N 15°20′58″E
- Country: Poland
- Voivodeship: West Pomeranian
- County: Łobez
- Gmina: Radowo Małe

Gostomin [ɡɔsˈtɔmin] (German: Justemin) is a village in the administrative district of Gmina Radowo Małe, within Łobez County, West Pomeranian Voivodeship, in north-western Poland. It lies approximately 8 km (5 mi) north-west of Radowo Małe, 19 km (12 mi) west of Łobez, and 59 km (37 mi) north-east of the regional capital Szczecin.
