= Radowo Wielkie =

- Village
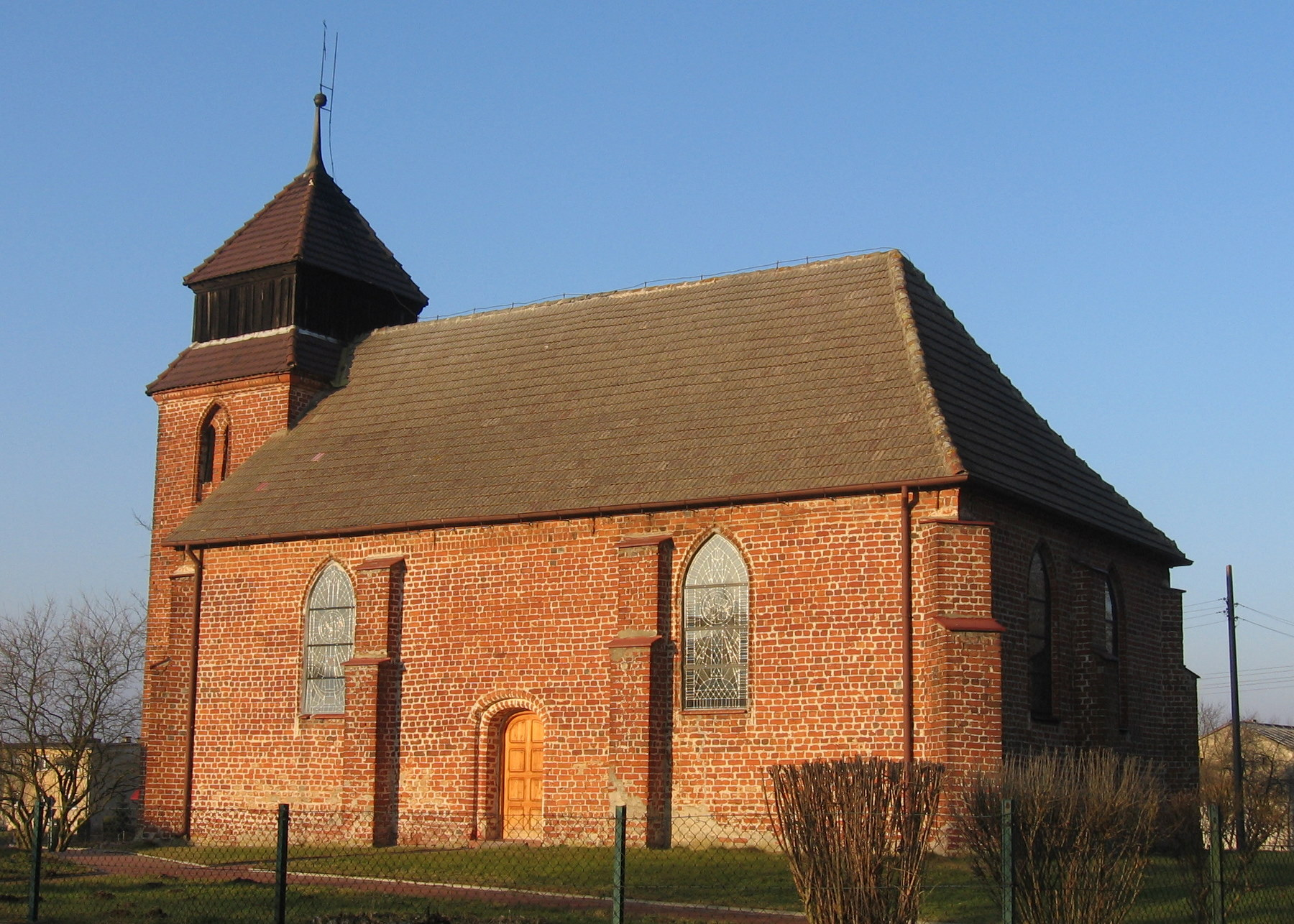
- Church of the Sacred Heart

- Location within Poland
- Coordinates: 53°41′11″N 15°25′9″E
- Country: Poland
- Voivodeship: West Pomeranian
- County: Łobez
- Gmina: Radowo Małe

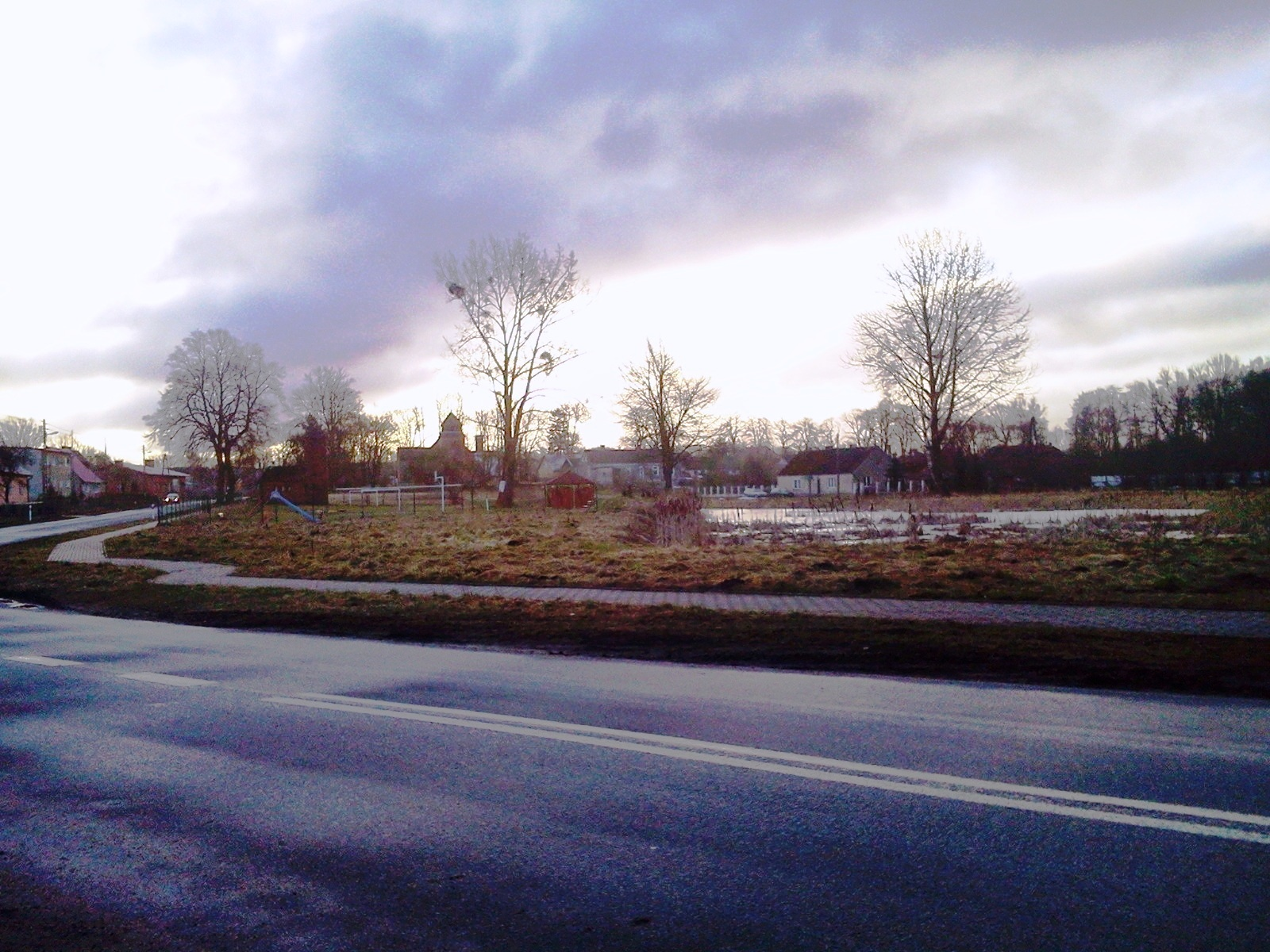

Radowo Wielkie [raˈdɔvɔ ˈvjɛlkʲɛ] (German: Groß Raddow) is a village in the administrative district of Gmina Radowo Małe, within Łobez County, West Pomeranian Voivodeship, in north-western Poland. It lies approximately 5 km (3 mi) north-west of Radowo Małe, 15 km (9 mi) north-west of Łobez, and 63 km (39 mi) north-east of the regional capital Szczecin.

For the history of the region, see History of Pomerania.
