= Pogorzelica =

Pogorzelica may refer to the following places:

- Pogorzelica, Greater Poland Voivodeship (west-central Poland)
- Pogorzelica, Gmina Karnice in West Pomeranian Voivodeship (north-west Poland)
- Pogorzelica, Gmina Rewal in West Pomeranian Voivodeship (north-west Poland)
- Pogorzelica, Łobez County in West Pomeranian Voivodeship (north-west Poland)
