= Mołdawin =

- Village
- Location within Poland
- Coordinates: 53°42′25″N 15°20′6″E
- Country: Poland
- Voivodeship: West Pomeranian
- County: Łobez
- Gmina: Radowo Małe
- Population: 40

Mołdawin [mɔwˈdavin] (German: Maldewin) is a village in the administrative district of Gmina Radowo Małe, within Łobez County, West Pomeranian Voivodeship, in north-western Poland. It lies approximately 10 km (6 mi) north-west of Radowo Małe, 21 km (13 mi) north-west of Łobez, and 60 km (37 mi) north-east of the regional capital Szczecin.

The village has a population of 40.
