= Rogowo, Łobez County =

Rogowo
- Village
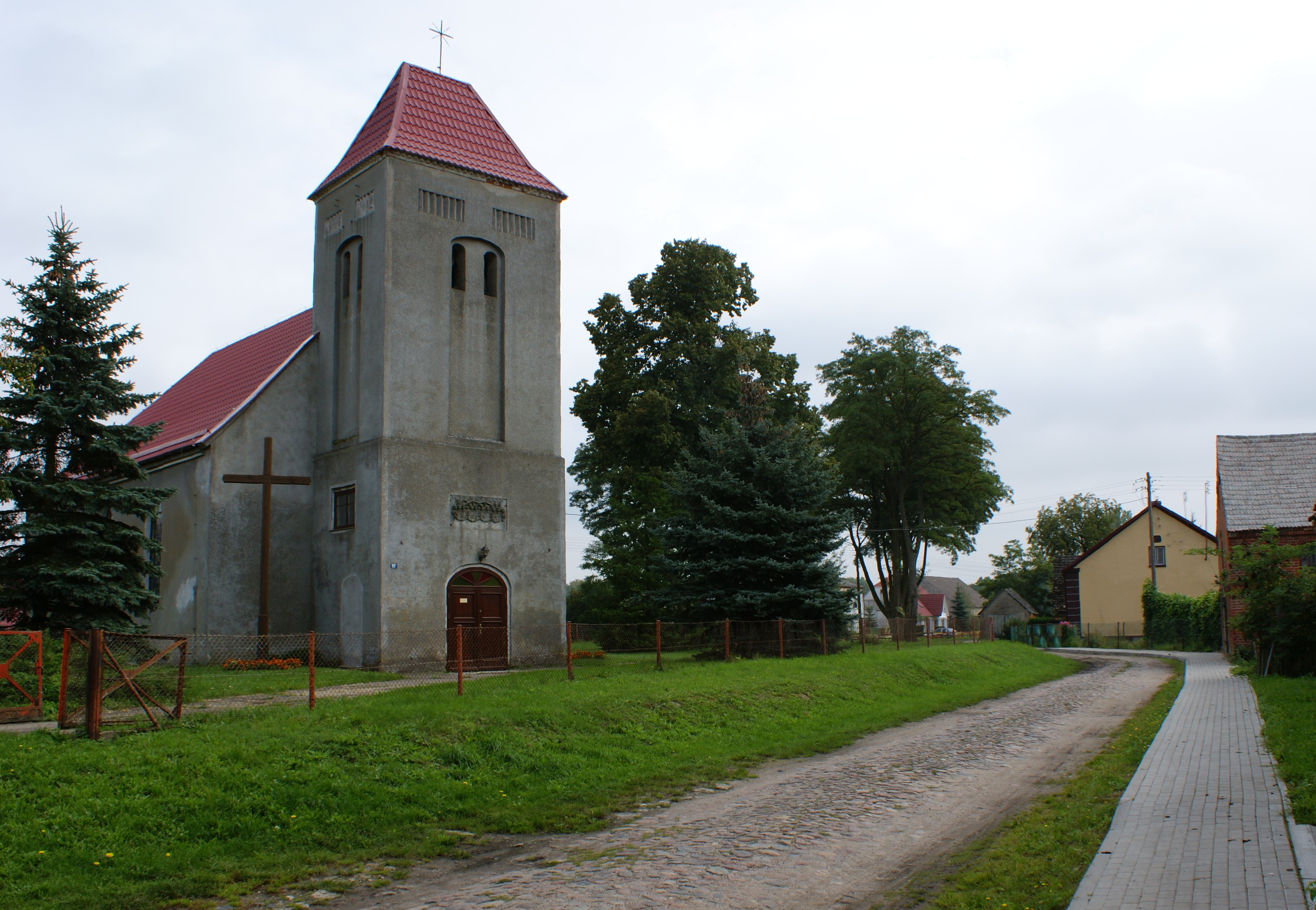
- Rogowo - church

- Location within Poland
- Coordinates: 53°37′56″N 15°21′37″E
- Country: Poland
- Voivodeship: West Pomeranian
- County: Łobez
- Gmina: Radowo Małe

Rogowo [rɔˈɡɔvɔ] (German: Roggow A) is a village in the administrative district of Gmina Radowo Małe, within Łobez County, West Pomeranian Voivodeship, in north-western Poland. It lies approximately 7 km (4 mi) west of Radowo Małe, 17 km (11 mi) west of Łobez, and 57 km (35 mi) north-east of the regional capital Szczecin.

For the history of the region, see history of Pomerania.
