= Strzmiele =

- Village
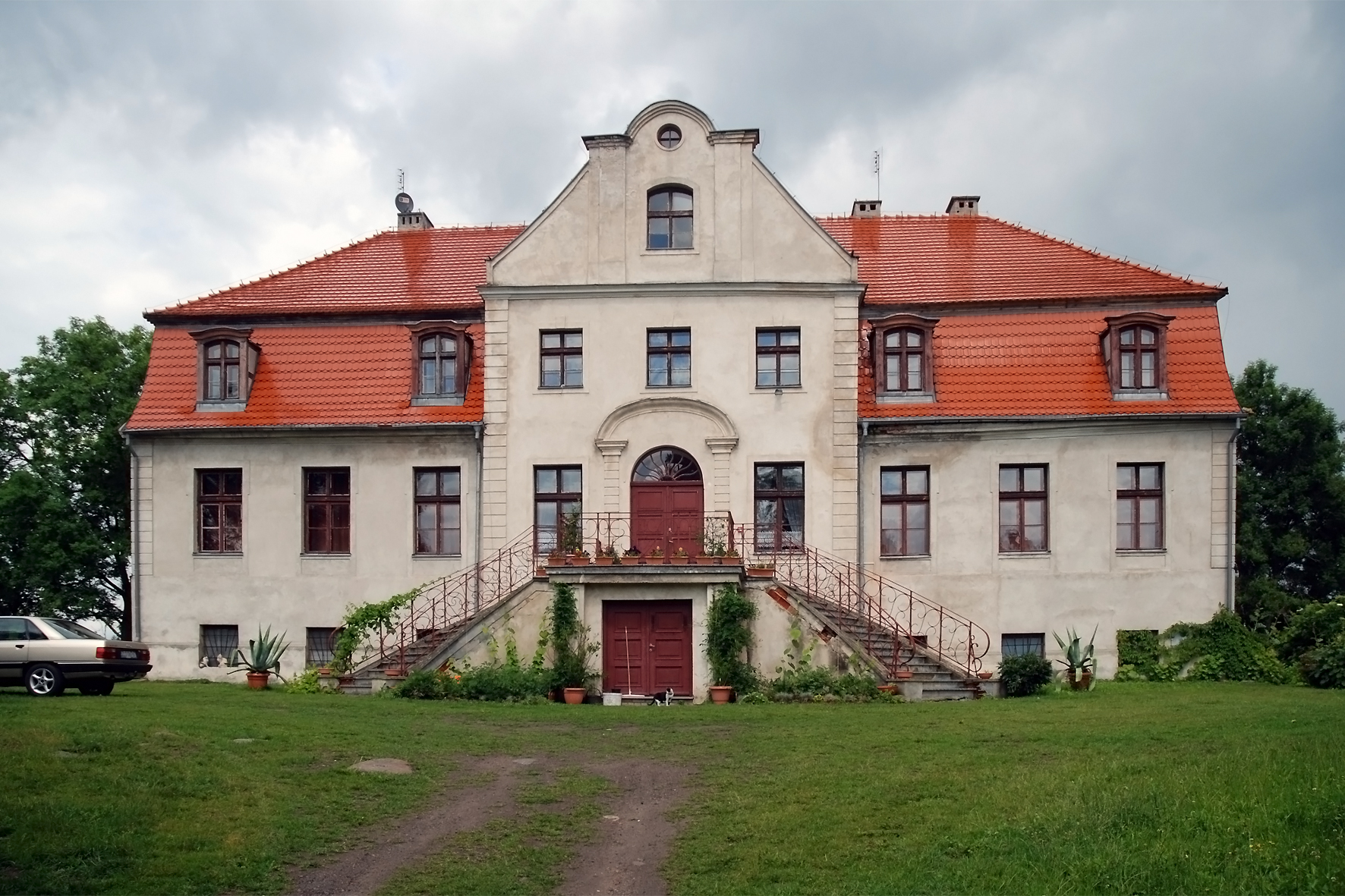
- Manor - Castle

- Location within Poland
- Coordinates: 53°39′5″N 15°31′33″E
- Country: Poland
- Voivodeship: West Pomeranian
- County: Łobez
- Gmina: Radowo Małe

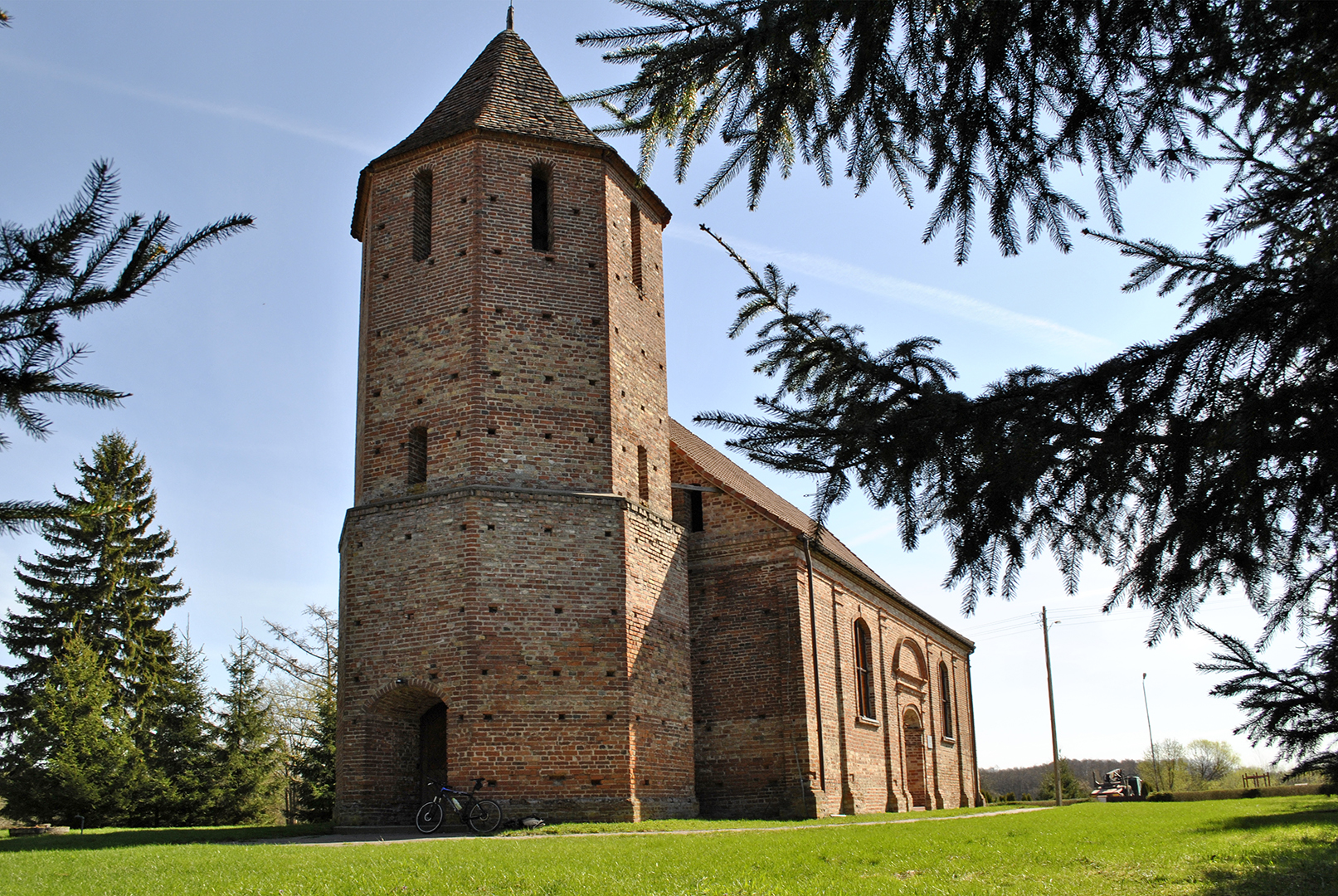

Strzmiele [ˈstʂmjɛlɛ] (German: Stramehl) is a village in the administrative district of Gmina Radowo Małe, within Łobez County, West Pomeranian Voivodeship, in north-western Poland. It lies approximately 6 km (4 mi) east of Radowo Małe, 7 km (4 mi) west of Łobez, and 68 km (42 mi) north-east of the regional capital Szczecin.

For the history of the region, see History of Pomerania.
