= Żelmowo =

- Village
- Location within Poland
- Coordinates: 53°38′57″N 15°22′12″E
- Country: Poland
- Voivodeship: West Pomeranian
- County: Łobez
- Gmina: Radowo Małe

Żelmowo [ʐɛlˈmɔvɔ] (German: Sallmow) is a village in the administrative district of Gmina Radowo Małe, within Łobez County, West Pomeranian Voivodeship, in north-western Poland. It lies approximately 6 km (4 mi) west of Radowo Małe, 17 km (11 mi) west of Łobez, and 59 km (37 mi) north-east of the regional capital Szczecin.

== See also ==
History of Pomerania
