= Smorawina =

- Settlement
- Location within Poland
- Coordinates: 53°40′19″N 15°31′56″E
- Country: Poland
- Voivodeship: West Pomeranian
- County: Łobez
- Gmina: Radowo Małe
- Population: 100

Smorawina [smɔraˈvina] (German: Schmorow) is a settlement in the administrative district of Gmina Radowo Małe, within Łobez County, West Pomeranian Voivodeship, in north-western Poland. It lies approximately 6 km (4 mi) north-east of Radowo Małe, 8 km (5 mi) north-west of Łobez, and 69 km (43 mi) north-east of the regional capital Szczecin.

For the history of the region, see History of Pomerania.

The settlement has a population of 100.
