= Władysław Grotyński =

Polish footballer

Personal information
- Date of birth: 16 October 1945
- Place of birth: Arciszewo, Poland
- Date of death: 28 June 2002 (aged 56)
- Place of death: Warsaw, Poland
- Height: 1.83 m (6 ft 0 in)
- Position: Goalkeeper

Youth career
- 1960–1963: Mazur Karczew

Senior career*
Years	Team	Apps	(Gls)
1964–1971	Legia Warsaw		
1974–1975	Zagłębie Sosnowiec		
1977–1978	Mazur Karczew		

International career
1970–1971	Poland	4	(0)
- * Club domestic league appearances and goals

Władysław Grotyński (16 October 1945 – 28 June 2002) was a Polish footballer who played as a goalkeeper.

He played in four matches for the Poland national team from 1970 to 1971.

== Honours ==
Legia Warsaw

- Ekstraklasa: 1968–69, 1969–70
- Polish Cup: 1965–66
