= Sienno Górne =

- Village
- Location within Poland
- Coordinates: 53°39′34″N 15°19′25″E
- Country: Poland
- Voivodeship: West Pomeranian
- County: Łobez
- Gmina: Radowo Małe

Sienno Górne [ˈɕɛnnɔ ˈɡurnɛ] (German: Schönau Gut B) is a village in the administrative district of Gmina Radowo Małe, within Łobez County, West Pomeranian Voivodeship, in north-western Poland. It lies approximately 9 km (6 mi) west of Radowo Małe, 20 km (12 mi) west of Łobez, and 56 km (35 mi) north-east of the regional capital Szczecin.

For the history of the region, see History of Pomerania.
