= Gildnica =

- Settlement
- Location within Poland
- Coordinates: 53°40′16″N 15°20′00″E
- Country: Poland
- Voivodeship: West Pomeranian
- County: Łobez
- Gmina: Radowo Małe

Gildnica [ɡildˈnit͡sa] is a settlement in the administrative district of Gmina Radowo Małe, within Łobez County, West Pomeranian Voivodeship, in north-western Poland.
