= Boniewo-Kolonia =

- Village
- Location within Poland
- Coordinates: 52°27′56″N 18°53′06″E
- Country: Poland
- Voivodeship: Kuyavian-Pomeranian
- County: Włocławek
- Gmina: Boniewo
- Time zone: UTC+1 (CET)
  - Summer (DST): UTC+2 (CEST)
- Vehicle registration: CWL

Boniewo-Kolonia ([bɔˈɲɛvɔ kɔˈlɔɲa]) is a village in the administrative district of Gmina Boniewo, within Włocławek County, Kuyavian-Pomeranian Voivodeship, in central Poland.
