= Pogorzelica, Łobez County =

Pogorzelica
- Village
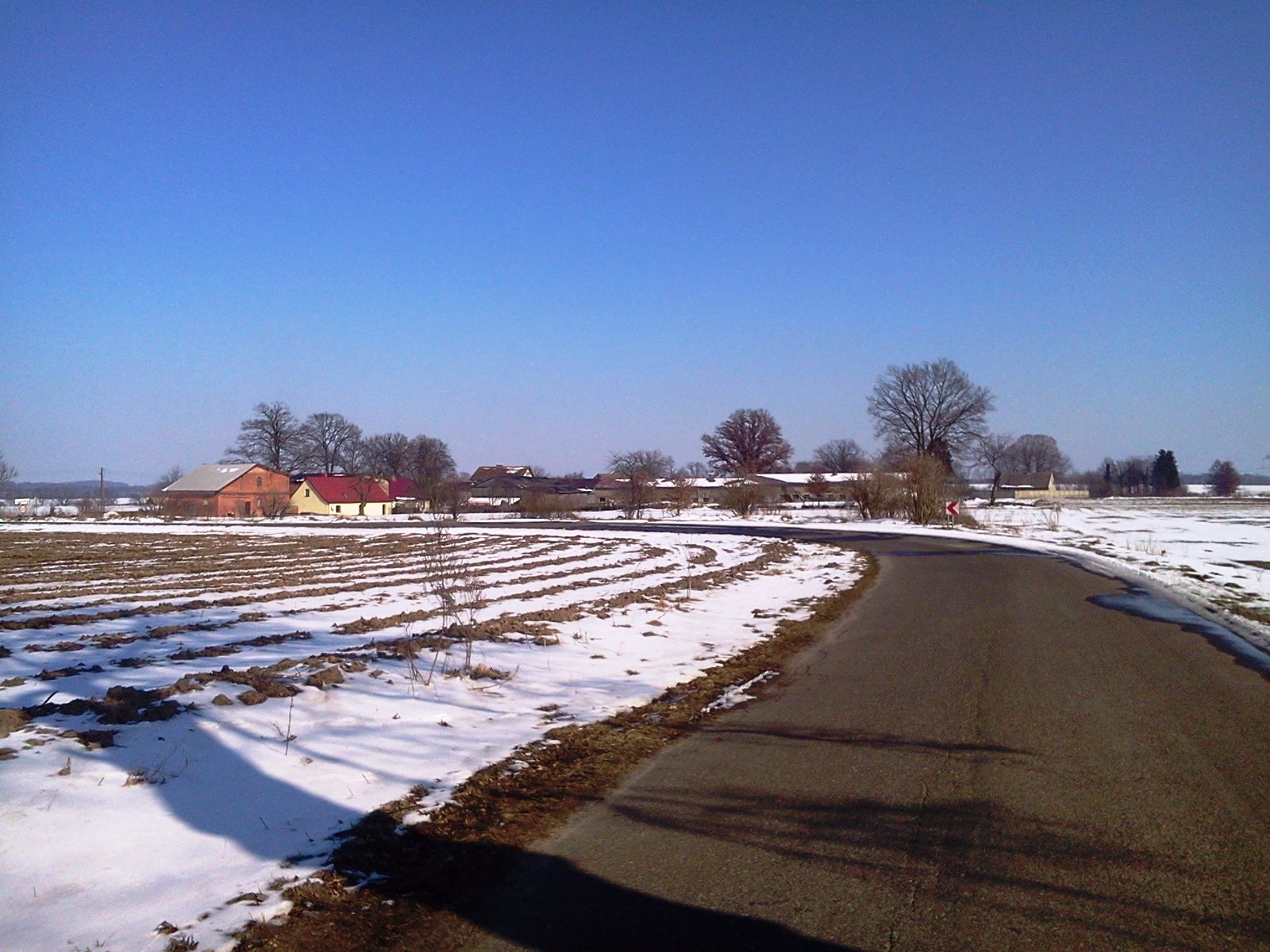
- Pogorzelica

- Location within Poland
- Coordinates: 53°39′24″N 15°24′43″E
- Country: Poland
- Voivodeship: West Pomeranian
- County: Łobez
- Gmina: Radowo Małe
- Time zone: UTC+1 (CET)
  - Summer (DST): UTC+2 (CEST)
- Vehicle registration: ZLO

Pogorzelica [pɔɡɔʐɛˈlit͡sa] (German: Margarethenhof) is a village in the administrative district of Gmina Radowo Małe, within Łobez County, West Pomeranian Voivodeship, in north-western Poland. It lies approximately 3 km (2 mi) west of Radowo Małe, 14 km (9 mi) west of Łobez, and 61 km (38 mi) north-east of the regional capital Szczecin. It is located in the historic region of Pomerania.

== History ==
The area became part of the emerging Polish state in the 10th century. Following Poland's fragmentation, it formed part of the Duchy of Pomerania. From the 18th century it was part of the Kingdom of Prussia, and from 1871 it was also part of Germany. Following Germany's defeat in World War II in 1945, the area became again part of Poland.
