= Sarnowo, Gmina Boniewo =

Sarnowo
- Village
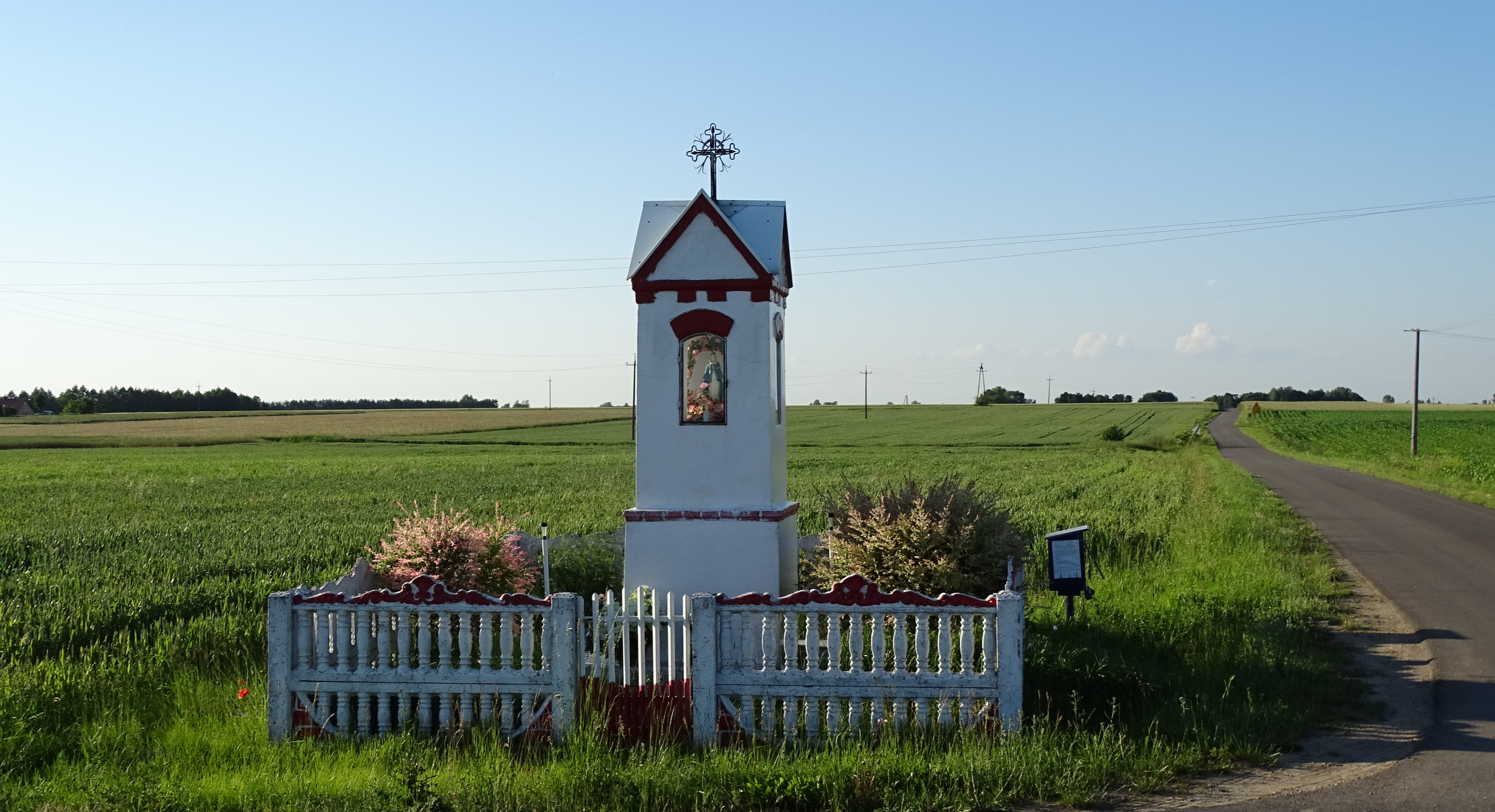
- The roadside shrine

- Location within Poland
- Coordinates: 52°26′01″N 18°56′07″E
- Country: Poland
- Voivodeship: Kuyavian-Pomeranian
- County: Włocławek
- Gmina: Boniewo

Sarnowo [sarˈnɔvɔ] is a village in the administrative district of Gmina Boniewo, within Włocławek County, Kuyavian-Pomeranian Voivodeship, in north-central Poland.
