= Żurawice, Kuyavian-Pomeranian Voivodeship =

Żurawice
- Village
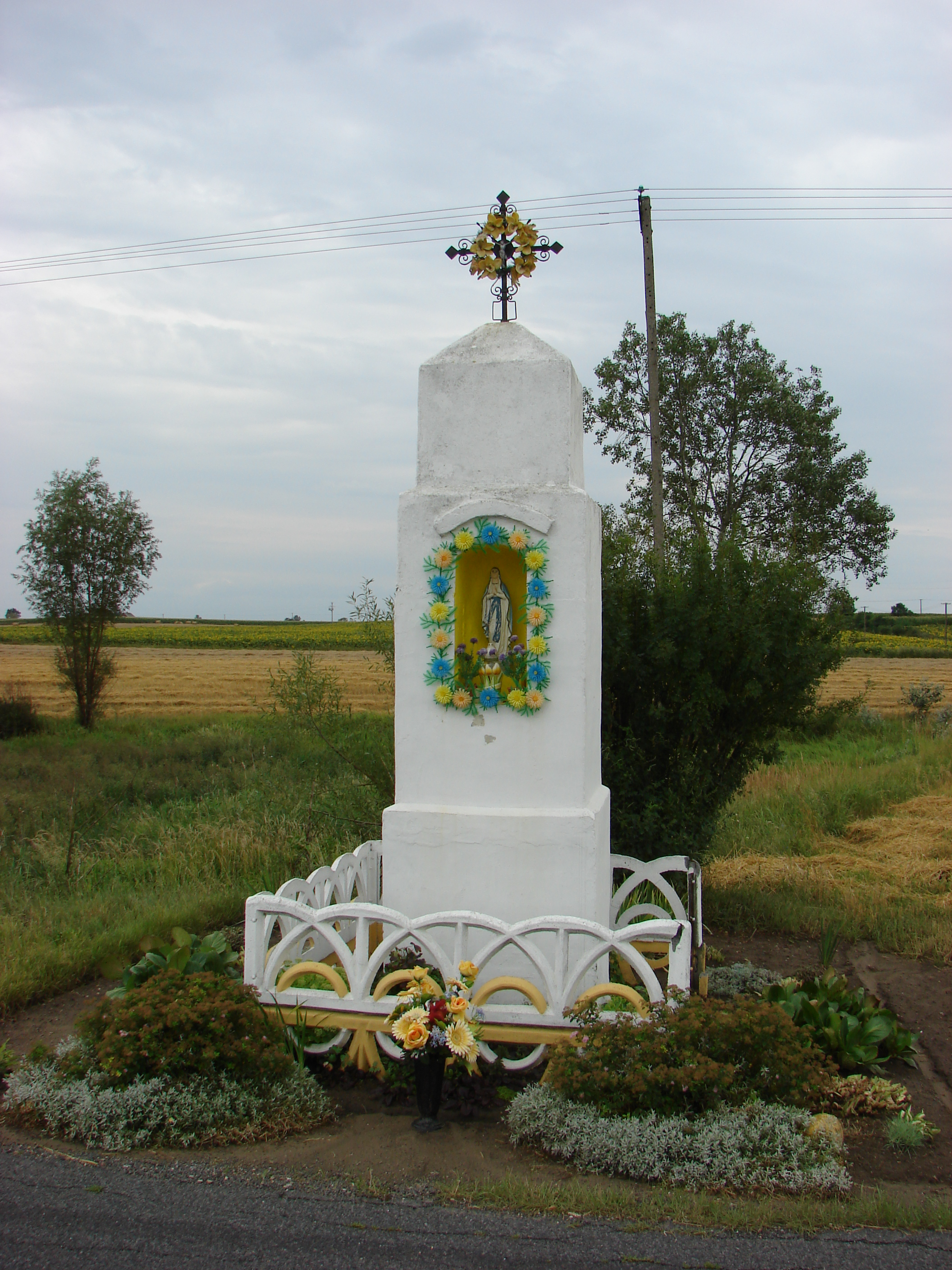
- The wayside shrine

- Location within Poland
- Coordinates: 52°24′45″N 18°55′18″E
- Country: Poland
- Voivodeship: Kuyavian-Pomeranian
- County: Włocławek
- Gmina: Boniewo

Żurawice [ʐuraˈvit͡sɛ] is a village in the administrative district of Gmina Boniewo, within Włocławek County, Kuyavian-Pomeranian Voivodeship, in north-central Poland.
