= Zygmunt Jałoszyński =

Polish javelin thrower

Personal information
- Born: 18 June 1946 (age 80) Łąki Markowe, Poland

Sport
- Sport: Track and field

Achievements and titles
- Personal best: 85.00 m (1970)
Medal record
Representing Poland
Summer Universiade
Bronze medal – third place	1970 Turin	Javelin throw

Zygmunt Jałoszyński (born 18 June 1946) is a Polish athlete, who competed in the javelin throw. He represented Poland at the European Championships 1971 where he got to final round. In 1970 he took a bronze medal in 1970 Summer Universiade in Turin (won by Miklos Nemeth). He was representative sports club Legia Warsaw. He was one of the top Polish sportsman in the 1970s decade. Personal best: 85.00 m (25 July 1970 in Łódź).

Year	1963	1964	1964	1966	1967	1968	1969	1970	1971	1972	1973	1974	1975	1976	1977	1978
Result (m)	58.88	61.40	60.81	contusion	70.00	70.12	77.74	85.00	84.14	78.12	77.24	73.20	80.00	81.06	81.10	75.18
