= Sieroszewo =

- Village
- Location within Poland
- Coordinates: 52°28′49″N 18°56′48″E
- Country: Poland
- Voivodeship: Kuyavian-Pomeranian
- County: Włocławek
- Gmina: Boniewo

Sieroszewo [ɕɛrɔˈʂɛvɔ] is a small village in the administrative district of Gmina Boniewo, within Włocławek County, Kuyavian-Pomeranian Voivodeship, in north-central Poland.
