= Sułkowo, Łobez County =

Sułkowo
- Village
- Location within Poland
- Coordinates: 53°36′45″N 15°27′31″E
- Country: Poland
- Voivodeship: West Pomeranian
- County: Łobez
- Gmina: Radowo Małe

Sułkowo [suu̯ˈkɔvɔ] (German: Friedrichsruh) is a village in the administrative district of Gmina Radowo Małe, within Łobez County, West Pomeranian Voivodeship, in north-western Poland. It lies approximately 5 km (3 mi) south of Radowo Małe, 11 km (7 mi) west of Łobez, and 62 km (39 mi) east of the regional capital Szczecin.
