= Osiecz Mały =

- Village
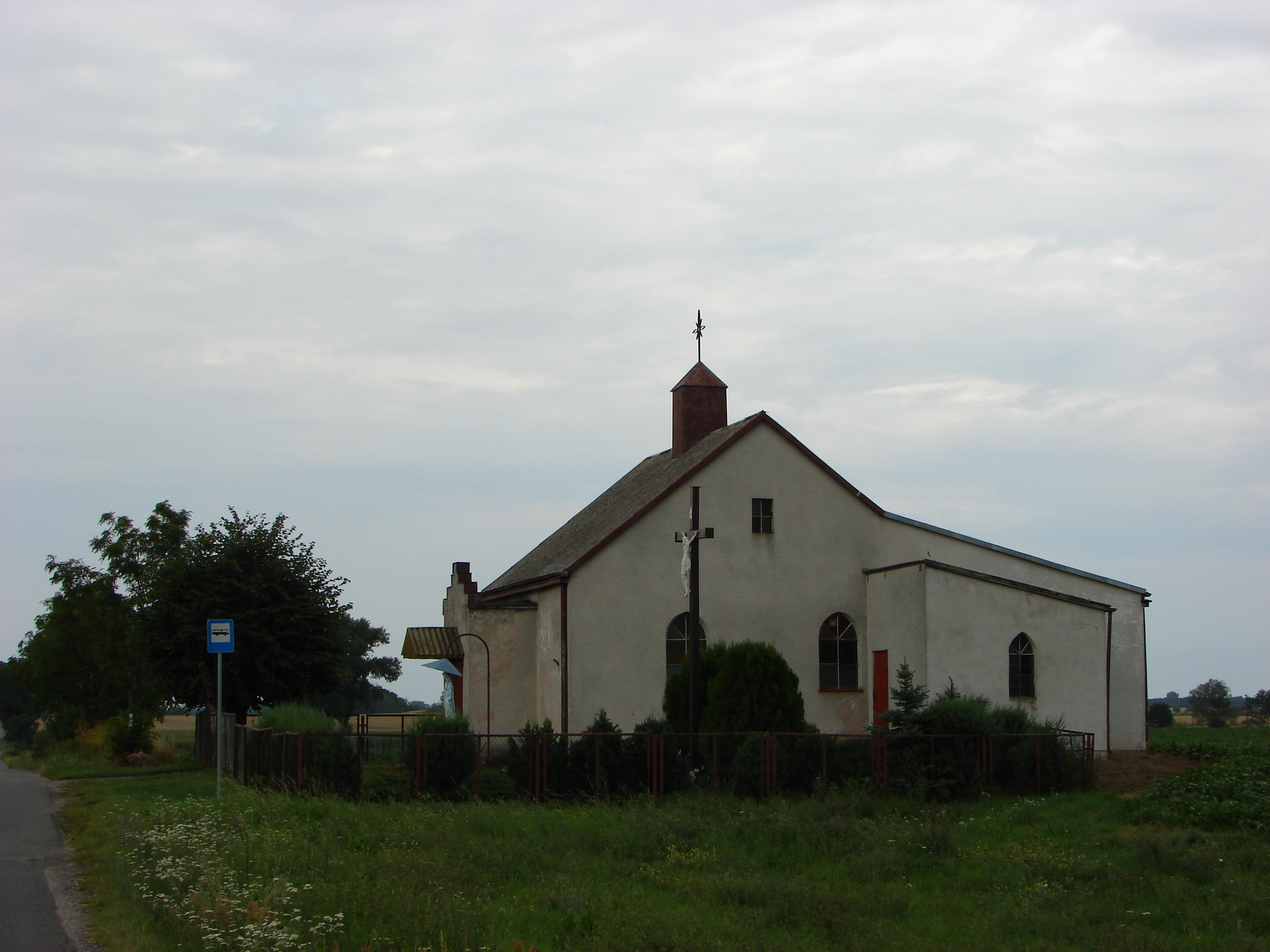
- Chapel of The Sacred Heart of Jesus

- Location within Poland
- Coordinates: 52°25′09″N 18°53′53″E
- Country: Poland
- Voivodeship: Kuyavian-Pomeranian
- County: Włocławek
- Gmina: Boniewo

Osiecz Mały [ˈɔɕɛt͡ʂ ˈmawɨ] is a village in the administrative district of Gmina Boniewo, within Włocławek County, Kuyavian-Pomeranian Voivodeship, in north-central Poland.
