= Mikołajki, Kuyavian-Pomeranian Voivodeship =

Mikołajki
- Village
- Location within Poland
- Coordinates: 52°29′31″N 18°55′29″E
- Country: Poland
- Voivodeship: Kuyavian-Pomeranian
- County: Włocławek
- Gmina: Boniewo

Mikołajki [mikɔˈwai̯ki] is a village in the administrative district of Gmina Boniewo, within Włocławek County, Kuyavian-Pomeranian Voivodeship, in north-central Poland.
