= Sułkowo =

Sułkowo may refer to:

- Sułkowo, Kuyavian-Pomeranian Voivodeship (north-central Poland)
- Sułkowo, Choszczno County in West Pomeranian Voivodeship (north-west Poland)
- Sułkowo, Łobez County in West Pomeranian Voivodeship (north-west Poland)
- Sułkowo, Stargard County in West Pomeranian Voivodeship (north-west Poland)
