= Łąki Markowe =

- Village
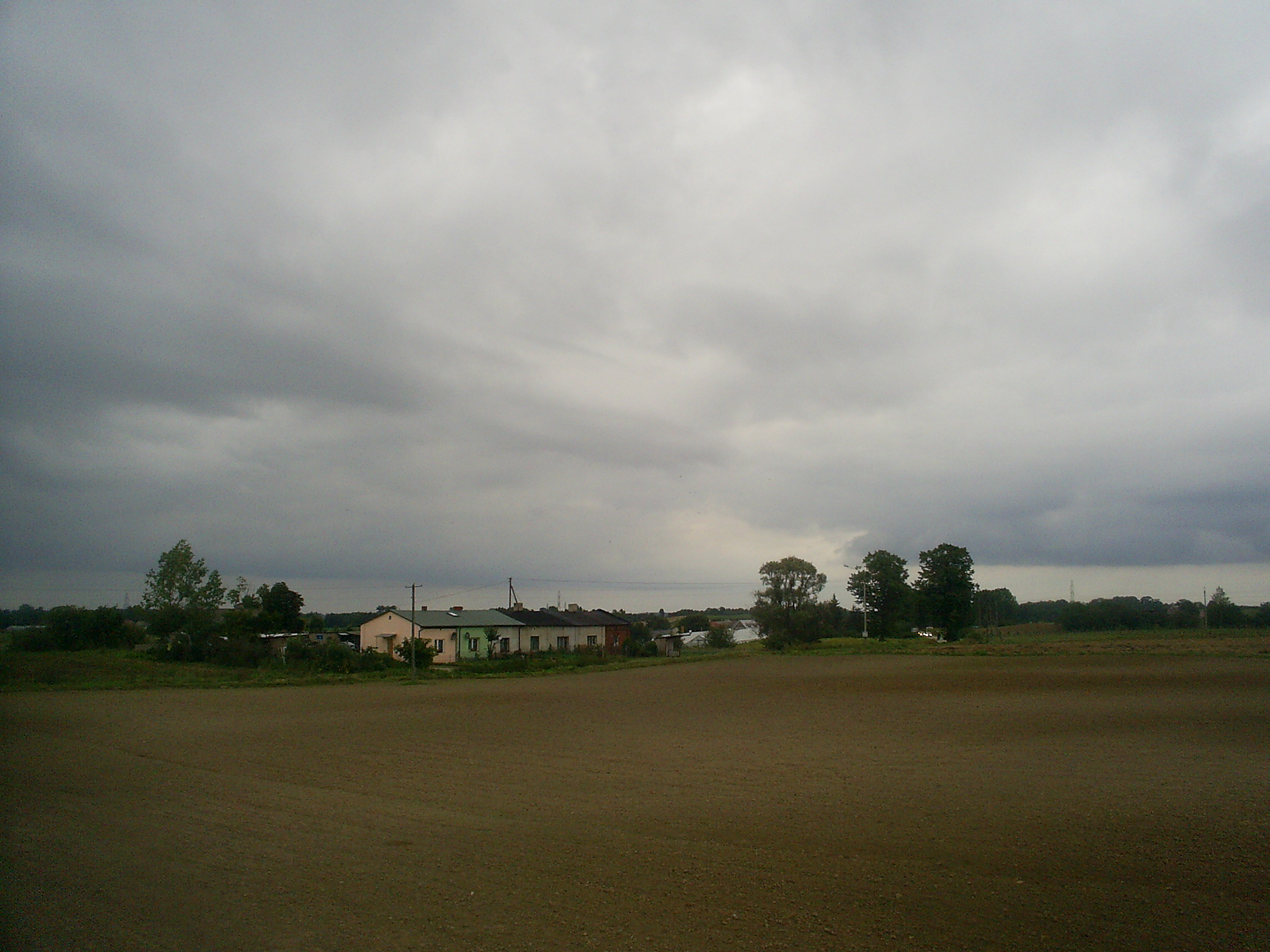

- Location within Poland
- Coordinates: 52°27′00″N 18°59′00″E
- Country: Poland
- Voivodeship: Kuyavian-Pomeranian
- County: Włocławek
- Gmina: Boniewo

Łąki Markowe (Polish pronunciation: [ˈwɔŋkʲi marˈkɔvɛ]) is a village in the administrative district of Gmina Boniewo, within Włocławek County, Kuyavian-Pomeranian Voivodeship, in north-central Poland. It has approximately 100 inhabitants. It is the birthplace of Polish sportsmen Zygmunt Jałoszyński and Roman Jałoszyński.
