= Otmianowo =

- Village
- Location within Poland
- Coordinates: 52°23′N 18°54′E
- Country: Poland
- Voivodeship: Kuyavian-Pomeranian
- County: Włocławek
- Gmina: Boniewo

Otmianowo [ɔtmjaˈnɔvɔ] is a village in the administrative district of Gmina Boniewo, within Włocławek County, Kuyavian-Pomeranian Voivodeship, in north-central Poland.
