= Wołkowo =

- Village
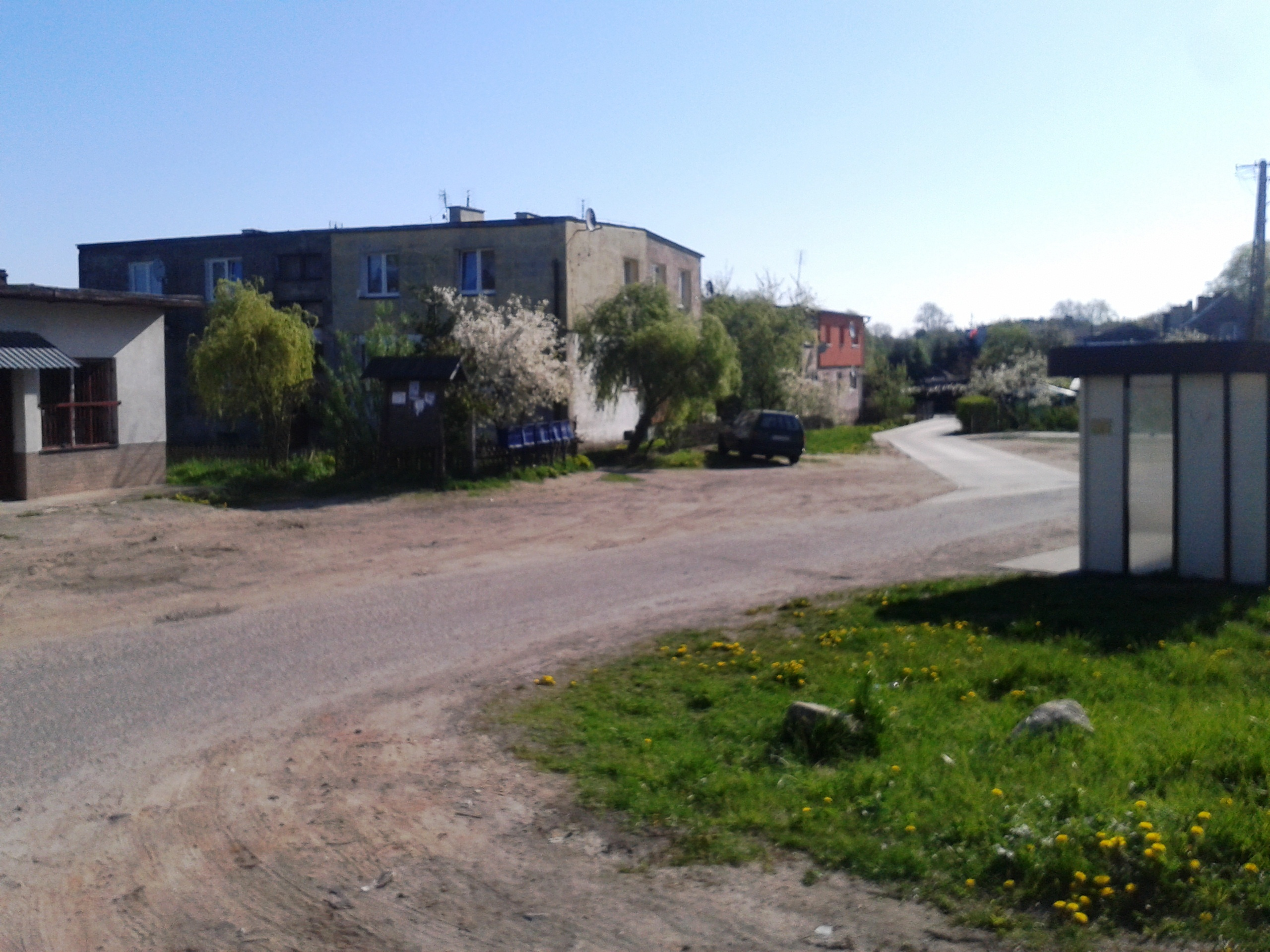

- Location within Poland
- Coordinates: 53°40′51″N 15°23′32″E
- Country: Poland
- Voivodeship: West Pomeranian
- County: Łobez
- Gmina: Radowo Małe

Wołkowo [vɔu̯ˈkɔvɔ] (German Wolkow) is a village in the administrative district of Gmina Radowo Małe, within Łobez County, West Pomeranian Voivodeship, in north-western Poland.

For the history of the region, see History of Pomerania.
