= Łąki Zwiastowe =

- Village
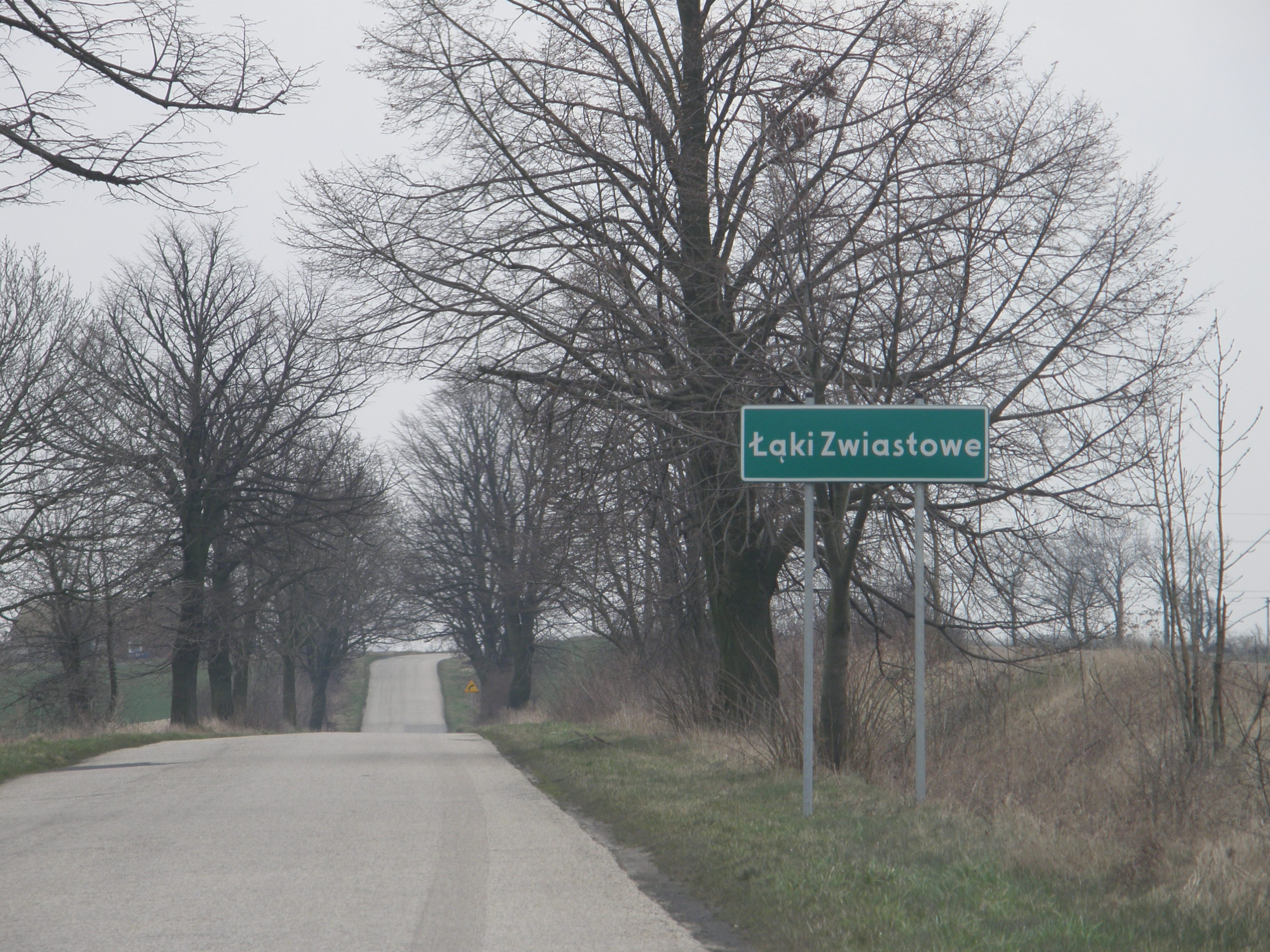

- Location within Poland
- Coordinates: 52°28′00″N 18°54′00″E
- Country: Poland
- Voivodeship: Kuyavian-Pomeranian
- County: Włocławek
- Gmina: Boniewo

Łąki Zwiastowe (Polish pronunciation: [ˈwɔŋkʲi zvjasˈtɔvɛ]) is a village in the administrative district of Gmina Boniewo, within Włocławek County, Kuyavian-Pomeranian Voivodeship, in north-central Poland.
