= Jastrzębiec, Włocławek County =

Jastrzębiec
- Village
- Location within Poland
- Coordinates: 52°27′49″N 18°50′52″E
- Country: Poland
- Voivodeship: Kuyavian-Pomeranian
- County: Włocławek
- Gmina: Boniewo

Jastrzębiec [jasˈtʂɛmbjɛt͡s] is a village in the administrative district of Gmina Boniewo, within Włocławek County, Kuyavian-Pomeranian Voivodeship, in north-central Poland.
