= Wólka Paruszewska =

- Village
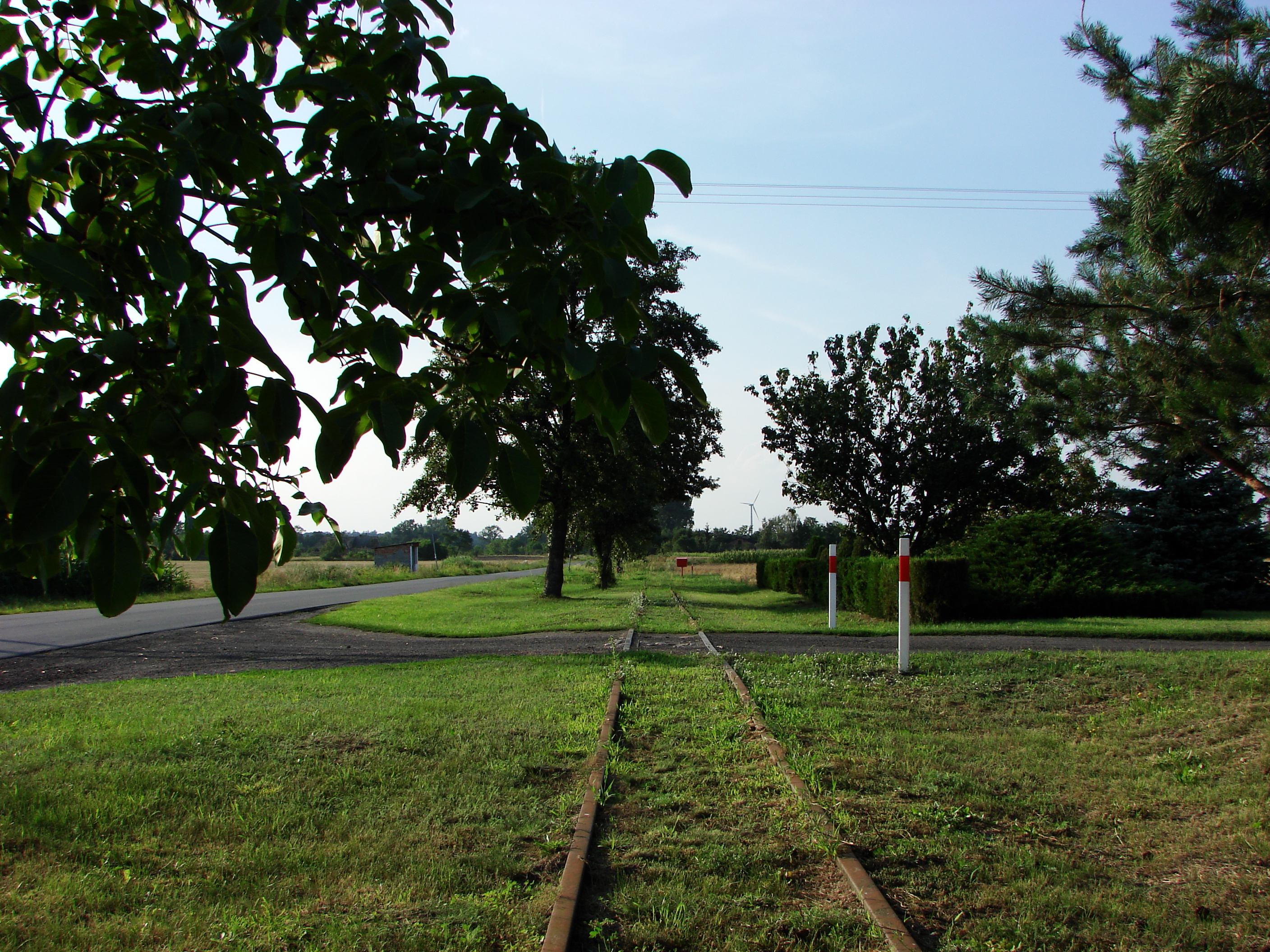
- Remains of narrow gauge railway, used in the years 1914-2008

- Location within Poland
- Coordinates: 52°27′30″N 18°53′28″E
- Country: Poland
- Voivodeship: Kuyavian-Pomeranian
- County: Włocławek
- Gmina: Boniewo

Wólka Paruszewska [ˈvulka paruˈʂɛfska] is a village in the administrative district of Gmina Boniewo, within Włocławek County, Kuyavian-Pomeranian Voivodeship, in north-central Poland.
