= Janowo, Gmina Boniewo =

Janowo
- Village
- Location within Poland
- Coordinates: 52°25′34″N 18°51′55″E
- Country: Poland
- Voivodeship: Kuyavian-Pomeranian
- County: Włocławek
- Gmina: Boniewo
- Population: 60

Janowo [jaˈnɔvɔ] is a village in the administrative district of Gmina Boniewo, within Włocławek County, Kuyavian-Pomeranian Voivodeship, in north-central Poland.
