= Borkowo Małe, West Pomeranian Voivodeship =

Borkowo Małe
- Settlement
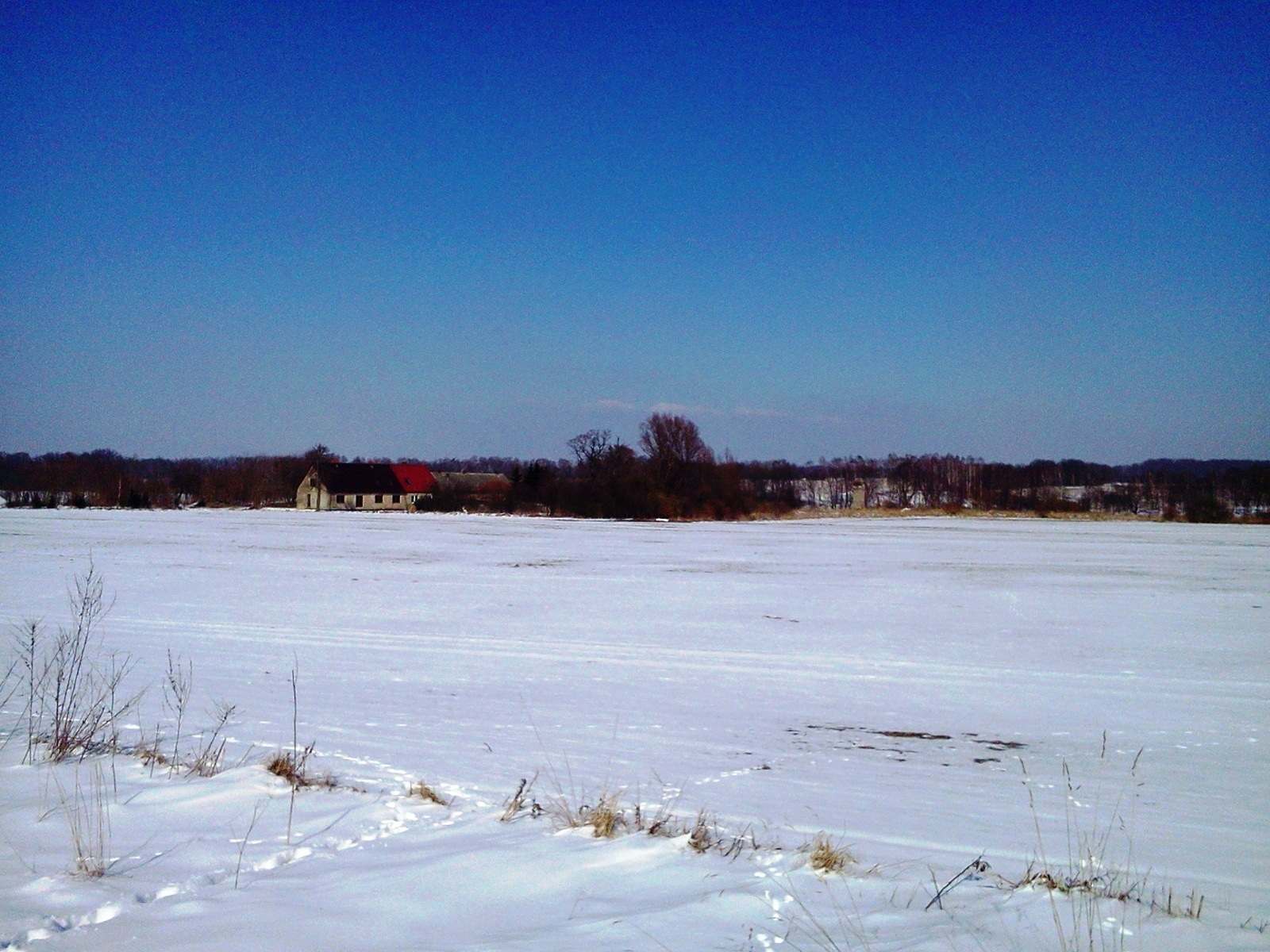
- Borkowo Małe

- Location within Poland
- Coordinates: 53°40′4″N 15°25′35″E
- Country: Poland
- Voivodeship: West Pomeranian
- County: Łobez
- Gmina: Radowo Małe

Borkowo Małe [bɔrˈkɔvɔ ˈmawɛ] (German: Klein Borckenhagen) is a settlement in the administrative district of Gmina Radowo Małe, within Łobez County, West Pomeranian Voivodeship, in north-western Poland.
