= Kaniewo =

- Village
- Location within Poland
- Coordinates: 52°30′N 18°56′E
- Country: Poland
- Voivodeship: Kuyavian-Pomeranian
- County: Włocławek
- Gmina: Boniewo
- Population: 250

Kaniewo [kaˈɲɛvɔ] is a village in the administrative district of Gmina Boniewo, within Włocławek County, Kuyavian-Pomeranian Voivodeship, in north-central Poland.
