= Ukłejki =

- Settlement
- Location within Poland
- Coordinates: 53°38′10″N 15°21′48″E
- Country: Poland
- Voivodeship: West Pomeranian
- County: Łobez
- Gmina: Radowo Małe

Ukłejki [uˈkwɛi̯ki] is a settlement in the administrative district of Gmina Radowo Małe, within Łobez County, West Pomeranian Voivodeship, in north-western Poland.

For the history of the region, see History of Pomerania.
