= Dargomyśl, Łobez County =

Dargomyśl
- Village
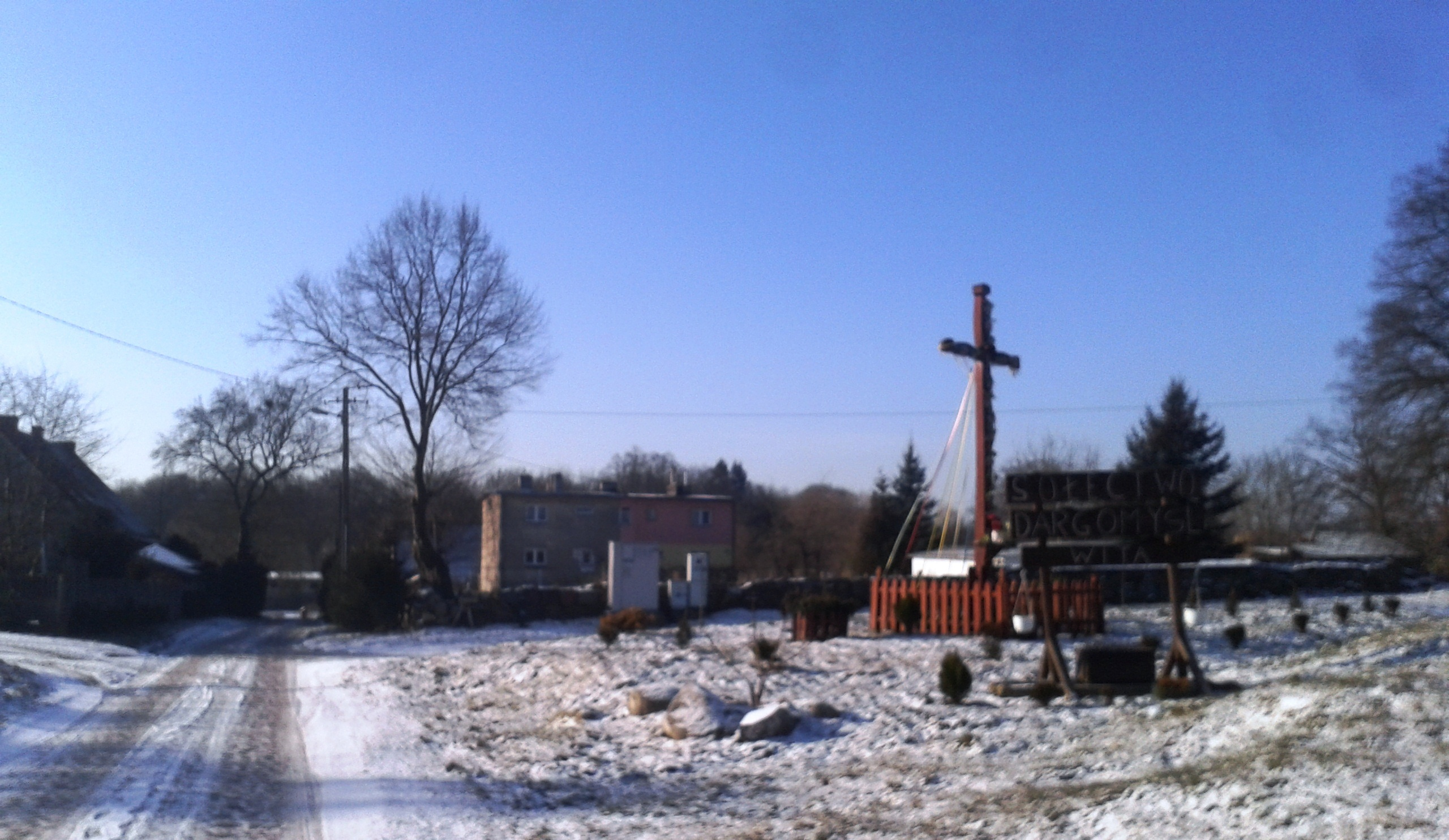
- Dargomyśl during winter time

- Coat of arms

- Location within Poland
- Coordinates: 53°38′01″N 15°22′29″E
- Country: Poland
- Voivodeship: West Pomeranian
- County: Łobez
- Gmina: Radowo Małe

Dargomyśl [darˈɡɔmɨɕl] (German: Hoffelde) is a village in the administrative district of Gmina Radowo Małe, within Łobez County, West Pomeranian Voivodeship, in north-western Poland.
