= Łąki Wielkie =

- Village
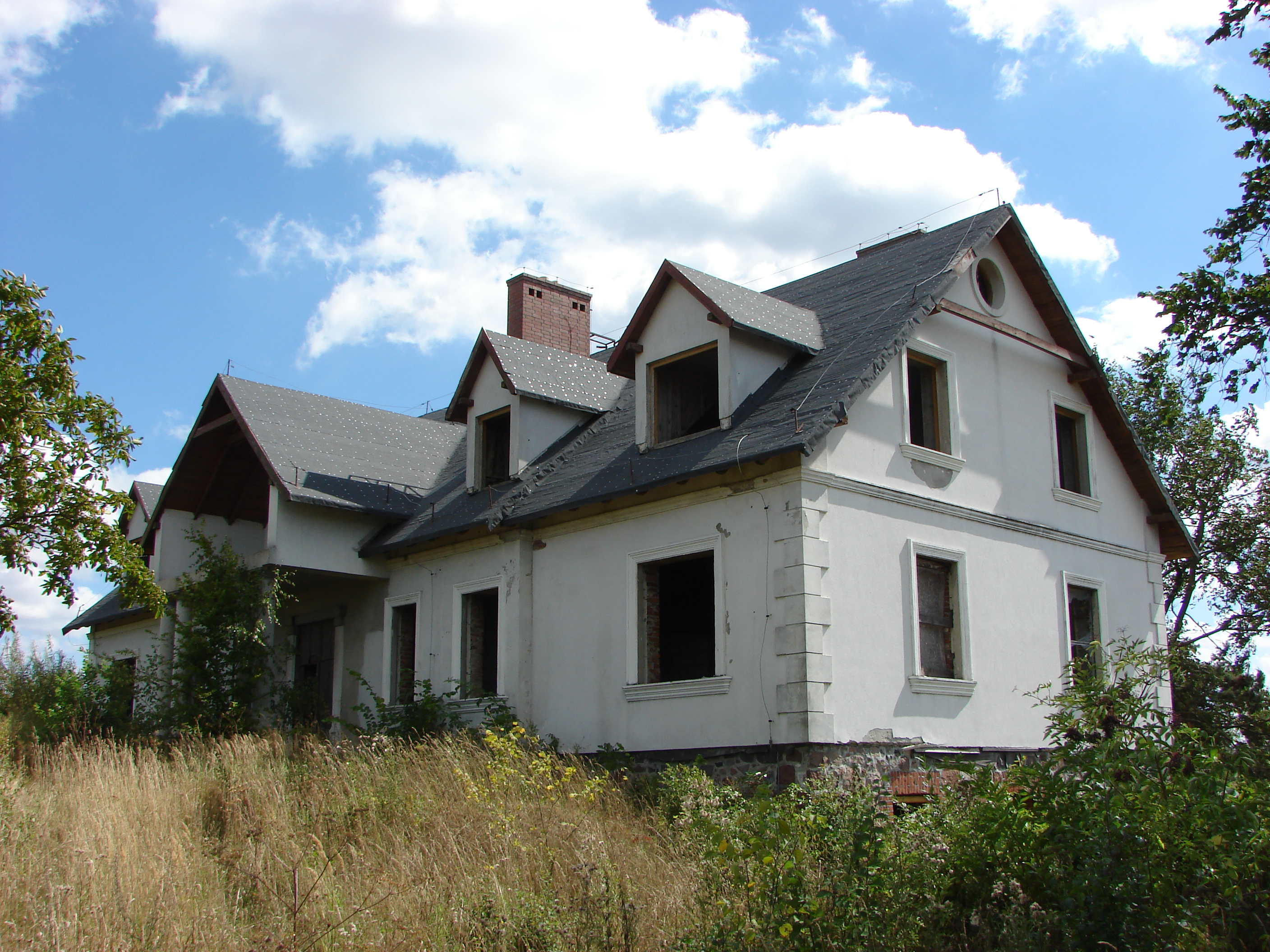
- The manor house under renovation.

- Location within Poland
- Coordinates: 52°27′25″N 18°54′29″E
- Country: Poland
- Voivodeship: Kuyavian-Pomeranian
- County: Włocławek
- Gmina: Boniewo

Łąki Wielkie (Polish pronunciation: [ˈwɔŋkʲi ˈvjɛlkʲɛ]) is a village in the administrative district of Gmina Boniewo, within Włocławek County, Kuyavian-Pomeranian Voivodeship, in north-central Poland.
