= Michałowo, Włocławek County =

Michałowo
- Village
- Location within Poland
- Coordinates: 52°27′34″N 18°51′7″E
- Country: Poland
- Voivodeship: Kuyavian-Pomeranian
- County: Włocławek
- Gmina: Boniewo
- Population: 40

Michałowo [mixaˈwɔvɔ] is a village in the administrative district of Gmina Boniewo, within Włocławek County, Kuyavian-Pomeranian Voivodeship, in north-central Poland.
