= Bierzyn, Kuyavian-Pomeranian Voivodeship =

Bierzyn
- Village
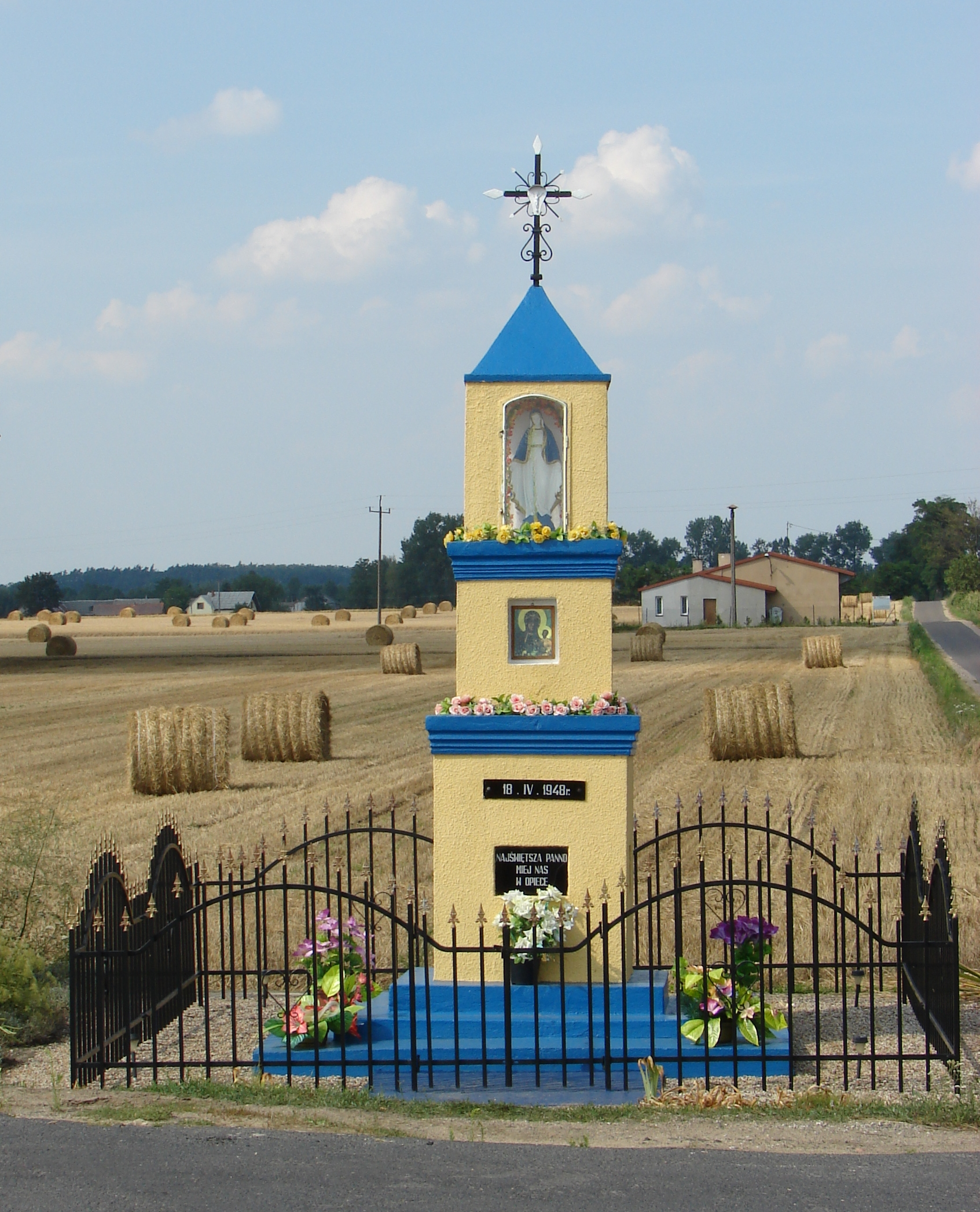
- The wayside shrine, built 1948.

- Location within Poland
- Coordinates: 52°26′42″N 18°51′32″E
- Country: Poland
- Voivodeship: Kuyavian-Pomeranian
- County: Włocławek
- Gmina: Boniewo

Population
  - Total: 260
- Time zone: UTC+1 (CET)
  - Summer (DST): UTC+2 (CEST)
- Vehicle registration: CWL

Bierzyn [ˈbjɛʐɨn] is a village in the administrative district of Gmina Boniewo, within Włocławek County, Kuyavian-Pomeranian Voivodeship, in central Poland.
