= Bnin, Włocławek County =

Bnin
- Village
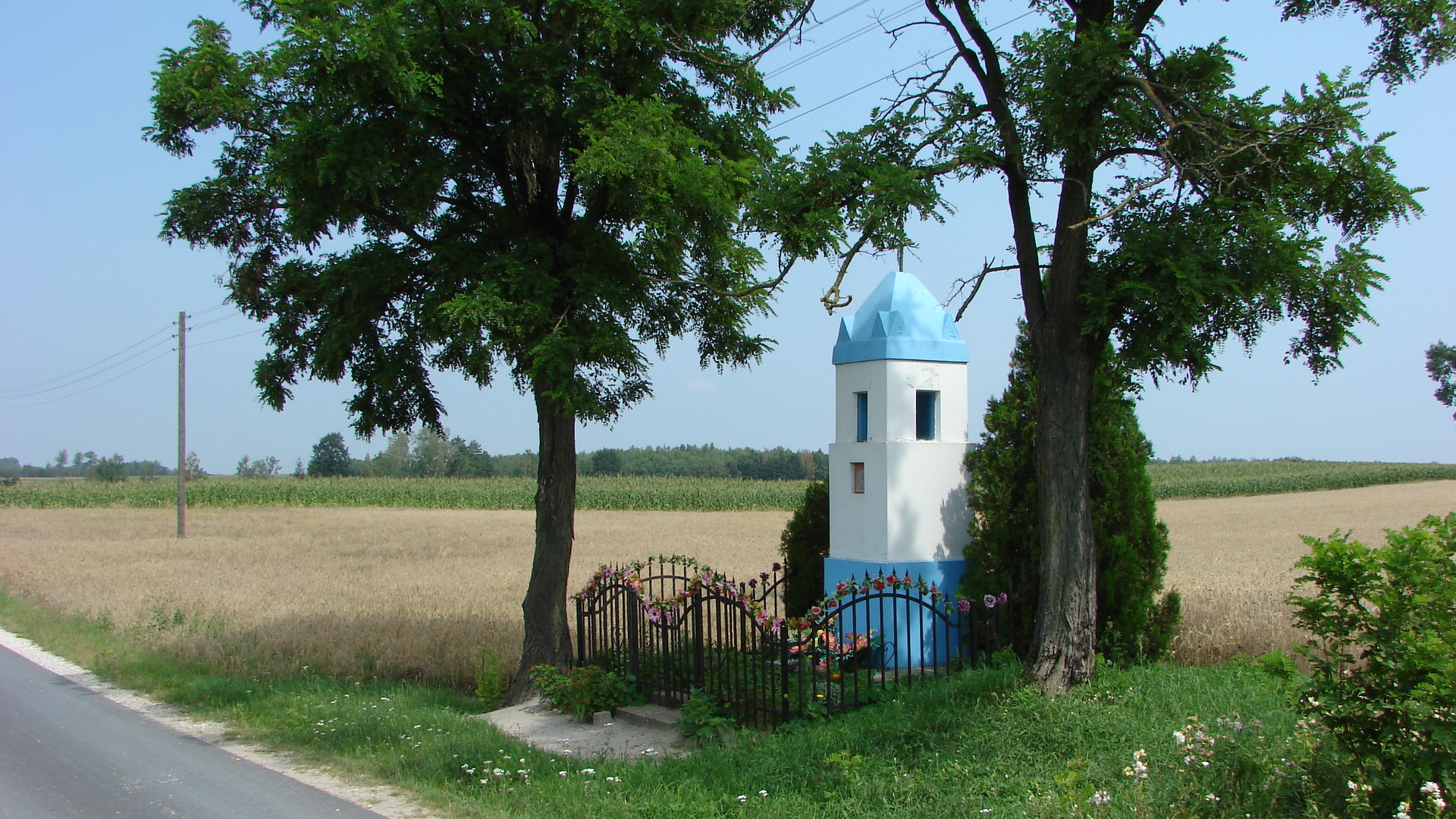
- Wayside shrine

- Location within Poland
- Coordinates: 52°24′2″N 18°54′39″E
- Country: Poland
- Voivodeship: Kuyavian-Pomeranian
- County: Włocławek
- Gmina: Boniewo

Population
  - Total: 40
- Time zone: UTC+1 (CET)
  - Summer (DST): UTC+2 (CEST)
- Vehicle registration: CWL

Bnin [bnin] is a village in the administrative district of Gmina Boniewo, within Włocławek County, Kuyavian-Pomeranian Voivodeship, in central Poland.
