= Osiecz Wielki =

- Village
- Location within Poland
- Coordinates: 52°26′N 18°54′E
- Country: Poland
- Voivodeship: Kuyavian-Pomeranian
- County: Włocławek
- Gmina: Boniewo

Osiecz Wielki (Polish pronunciation: [ˈɔɕɛtʂ ˈfjɛlkʲi]) is a village in the administrative district of Gmina Boniewo, within Włocławek County, Kuyavian-Pomeranian Voivodeship, in north-central Poland.
