= Łączewna, Kuyavian-Pomeranian Voivodeship =

Łączewna
- Village
- Location within Poland
- Coordinates: 52°27′16″N 18°56′26″E
- Country: Poland
- Voivodeship: Kuyavian-Pomeranian
- County: Włocławek
- Gmina: Boniewo

Łączewna [wɔnˈt͡ʂɛvna] is a village in the administrative district of Gmina Boniewo, within Włocławek County, Kuyavian-Pomeranian Voivodeship, in north-central Poland.
