= Paruszewice =

- Village
- Location within Poland
- Coordinates: 52°28′54″N 18°56′10″E
- Country: Poland
- Voivodeship: Kuyavian-Pomeranian
- County: Włocławek
- Gmina: Boniewo
- Population: 40

Paruszewice [paruʂɛˈvit͡sɛ] is a village in the administrative district of Gmina Boniewo, within Włocławek County, Kuyavian-Pomeranian Voivodeship, in north-central Poland.
