= Gmina Radowo Małe =

Gmina Radowo Małe Radowo Małe Commune
- Gmina
- Flag Coat of arms
- Interactive map of Gmina Radowo Małe
- Coordinates (Radowo Małe): 53°39′N 15°27′E
- Country: Poland
- Voivodeship: West Pomeranian
- County: Łobez
- Seat: Radowo Małe

Area
  - Total: 180.40 km^{2} (69.65 sq mi)

Population (2006)
  - Total: 3,760
  - Density: 20.8/km^{2} (54.0/sq mi)
- Website: http://www.radowomale.pl/

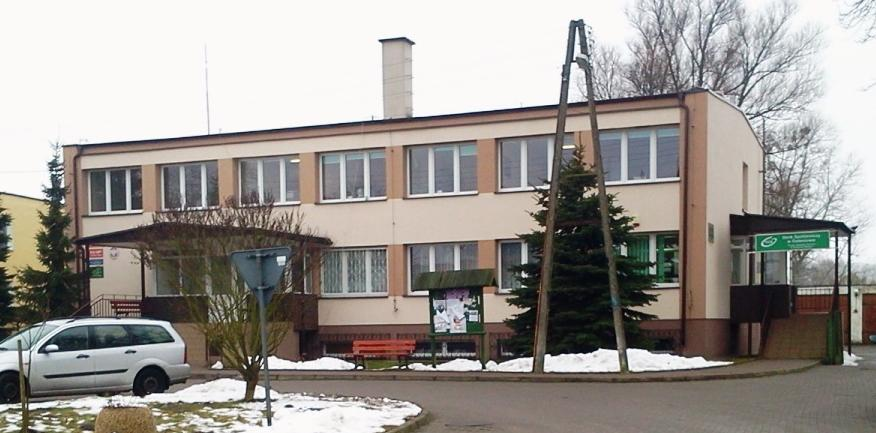
Commune office

Gmina Radowo Małe is a rural gmina (administrative district) in Łobez County, West Pomeranian Voivodeship, in north-western Poland. Its seat is the village of Radowo Małe, which lies approximately 12 kilometres (7 mi) west of Łobez and 63 km (39 mi) north-east of the regional capital Szczecin.

The gmina covers an area of 180.40 square kilometres (69.7 sq mi), and as of 2006 its total population is 3,760.

== Villages ==
Gmina Radowo Małe contains the villages and settlements of Borkowo Małe, Borkowo Wielkie, Czachowo, Dargomyśl, Dobrkowo, Gildnica, Gostomin, Karnice, Maliniec, Mołdawin, Mołdawinek, Orle, Pogorzelica, Radowo Małe, Radowo Wielkie, Radzim, Rekowo, Rogowo, Siedlice, Sienno Dolne, Sienno Górne, Smorawina, Strzmiele, Sułkowo, Troszczyno, Ukłejki, Wołkowo and Żelmowo.

== Neighbouring gminas ==
Gmina Radowo Małe is bordered by the gminas of Dobra, Łobez, Nowogard, Resko and Węgorzyno.
