= Lubomin Leśny =

- Village
- Location within Poland
- Coordinates: 52°28′N 18°49′E
- Country: Poland
- Voivodeship: Kuyavian-Pomeranian
- County: Włocławek
- Gmina: Boniewo

Lubomin Leśny [luˈbɔmin ˈlɛɕnɨ] is a village in the administrative district of Gmina Boniewo, within Włocławek County, Kuyavian-Pomeranian Voivodeship, in north-central Poland.
