= Anielin, Włocławek County =

Anielin
- Village
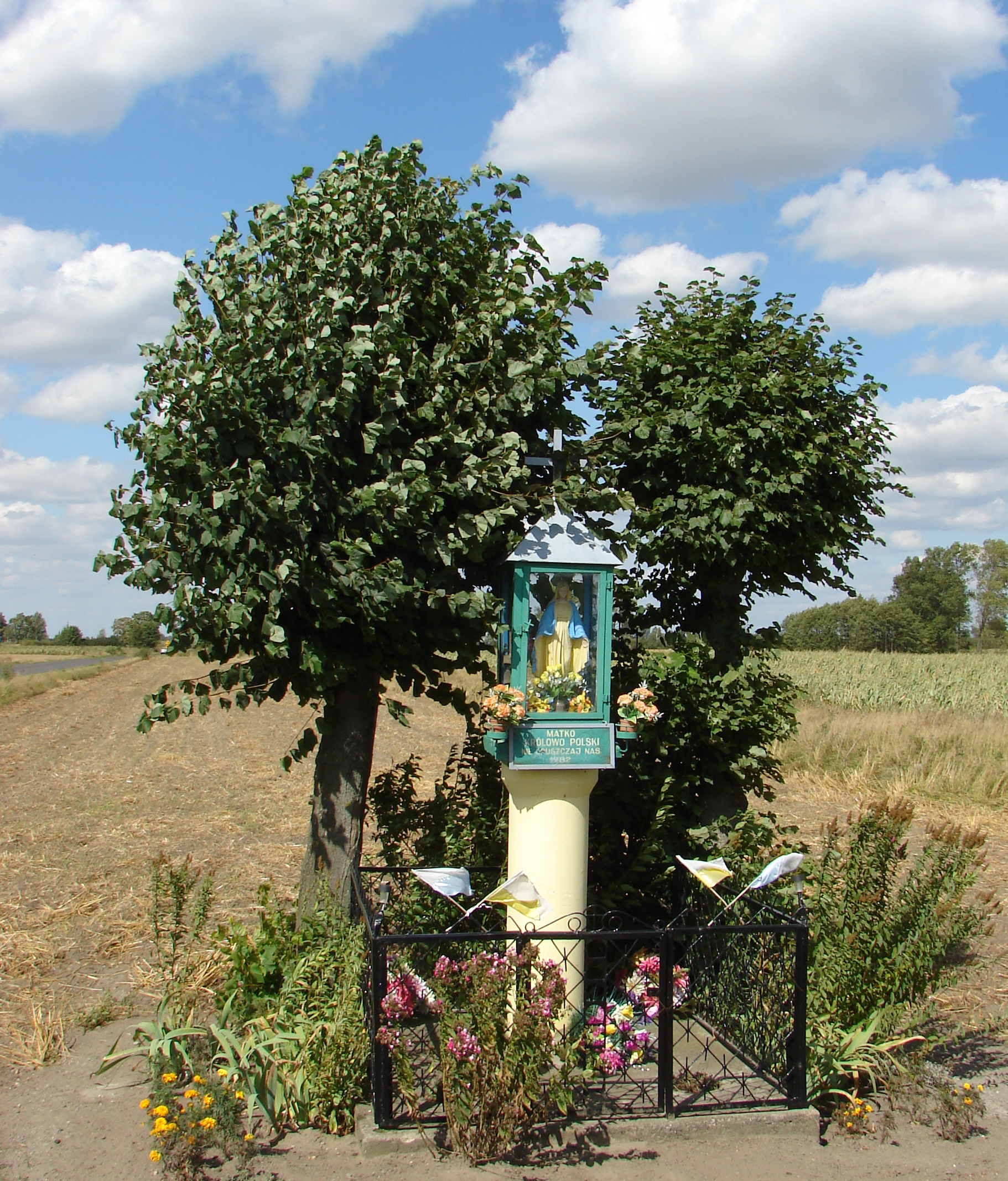
- Wayside shrine, built in 1982

- Location within Poland
- Coordinates: 52°26′44″N 18°54′0″E
- Country: Poland
- Voivodeship: Kuyavian-Pomeranian
- County: Włocławek
- Gmina: Boniewo

Population
  - Total: 110
- Time zone: UTC+1 (CET)
  - Summer (DST): UTC+2 (CEST)
- Vehicle registration: CWL

Anielin [aˈɲɛlin] is a village in the administrative district of Gmina Boniewo, within Włocławek County, Kuyavian-Pomeranian Voivodeship, in central Poland.
