= Lubomin, Kuyavian-Pomeranian Voivodeship =

Lubomin
- Village
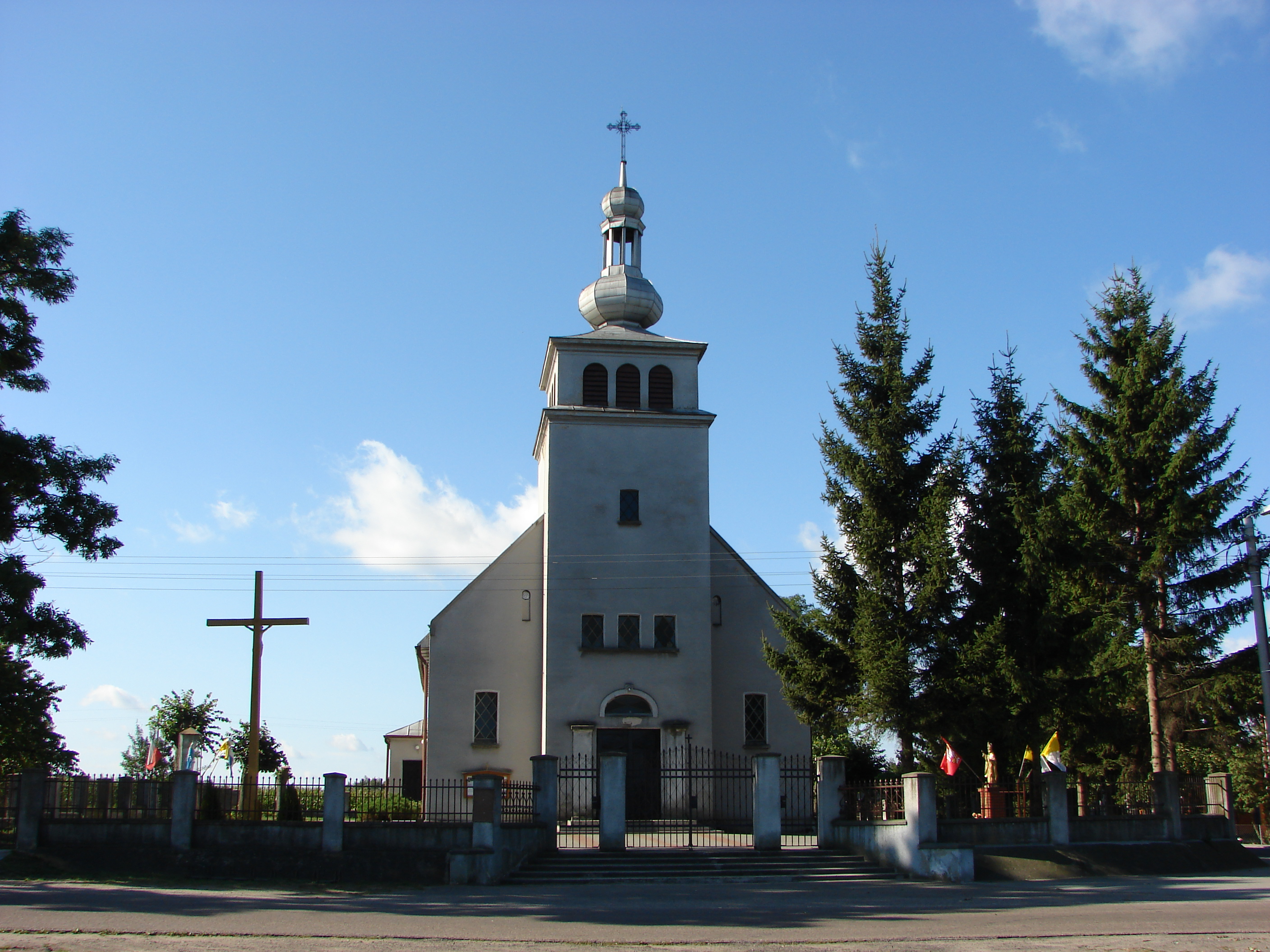
- Church of The Holy Trinity

- Location within Poland
- Coordinates: 52°27′N 18°50′E
- Country: Poland
- Voivodeship: Kuyavian-Pomeranian
- County: Włocławek
- Gmina: Boniewo

Lubomin [luˈbɔmin] is a village in the administrative district of Gmina Boniewo, within Włocławek County, Kuyavian-Pomeranian Voivodeship, in central Poland.

Three Polish citizens were murdered by Nazi Germany in the village during World War II.
