= Boniewo, Kuyavian-Pomeranian Voivodeship =

Boniewo
- Village
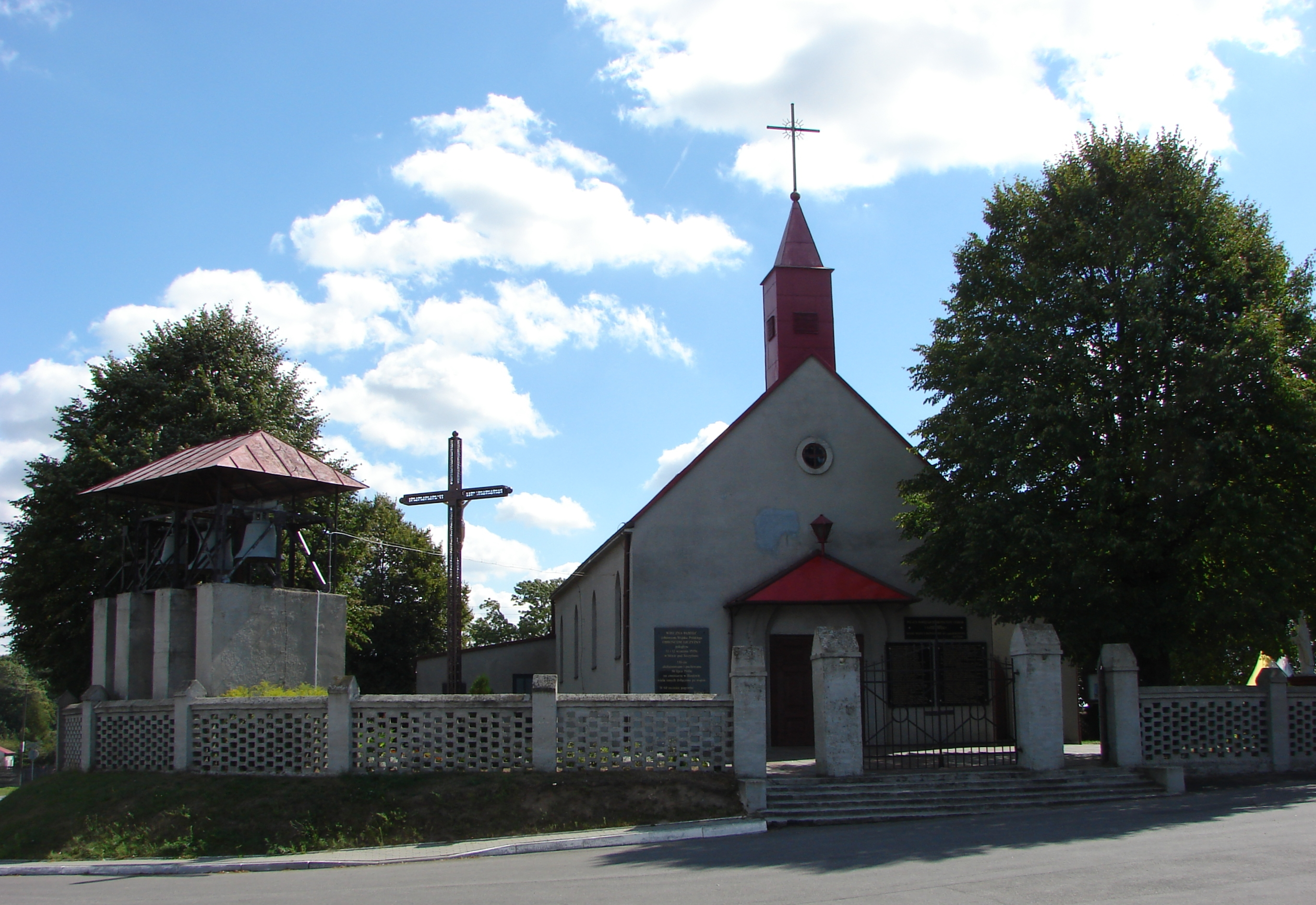
- Parish church of the Visitation of the Most Blessed Virgin Mary

- Location within Poland
- Coordinates: 52°29′N 18°53′E
- Country: Poland
- Voivodeship: Kuyavian-Pomeranian
- County: Włocławek
- Gmina: Boniewo
- Time zone: UTC+1 (CET)
  - Summer (DST): UTC+2 (CEST)
- Vehicle registration: CWL

Boniewo [bɔˈɲɛvɔ] is a village in Włocławek County, Kuyavian-Pomeranian Voivodeship, in central Poland. It is the seat of the gmina (administrative district) called Gmina Boniewo.
