= Gmina Boniewo =

Gmina Boniewo Boniewo Commune
- Gmina
- Gmina Office in Boniewo

- Coat of arms
- Interactive map of Gmina Boniewo
- Coordinates (Boniewo): 52°29′N 18°53′E
- Country: Poland
- Voivodeship: Kuyavian-Pomeranian
- County: Włocławek County
- Seat: Boniewo

Area
  - Total: 77.72 km^{2} (30.01 sq mi)

Population (2006)
  - Total: 3,550
  - Density: 45.7/km^{2} (118/sq mi)
- Time zone: UTC+1 (CET)
  - Summer (DST): UTC+2 (CEST)
- Vehicle registration: CWL
- Website: http://boniewo.pl

Gmina Boniewo is a rural gmina (administrative district) in Włocławek County, Kuyavian-Pomeranian Voivodeship, in central Poland. Its seat is the village of Boniewo, which lies approximately 22 kilometres (14 mi) south-west of Włocławek and 64 km (40 mi) south of Toruń.

The gmina covers an area of 77.72 square kilometres (30.0 sq mi), and as of 2006 its total population is 3,550.

== Villages ==
Gmina Boniewo contains the villages and settlements of Anielin, Arciszewo, Bierzyn, Bnin, Boniewo, Boniewo-Kolonia, Czuple, Grójczyk, Grójec, Janowo, Jastrzębiec, Jerzmanowo, Kaniewo, Łączewna, Łąki Markowe, Łąki Wielkie, Łąki Zwiastowe, Lubomin, Lubomin Leśny, Lubomin Rządowy, Michałowo, Mikołajki, Osiecz Mały, Osiecz Wielki, Otmianowo, Paruszewice, Sarnowo, Sieroszewo, Sułkówek, Wólka Paruszewska and Żurawice.

== Neighbouring gminas ==
Gmina Boniewo is bordered by the gminas of Choceń, Chodecz, Izbica Kujawska and Lubraniec.
