= Radowo Małe =

- Village
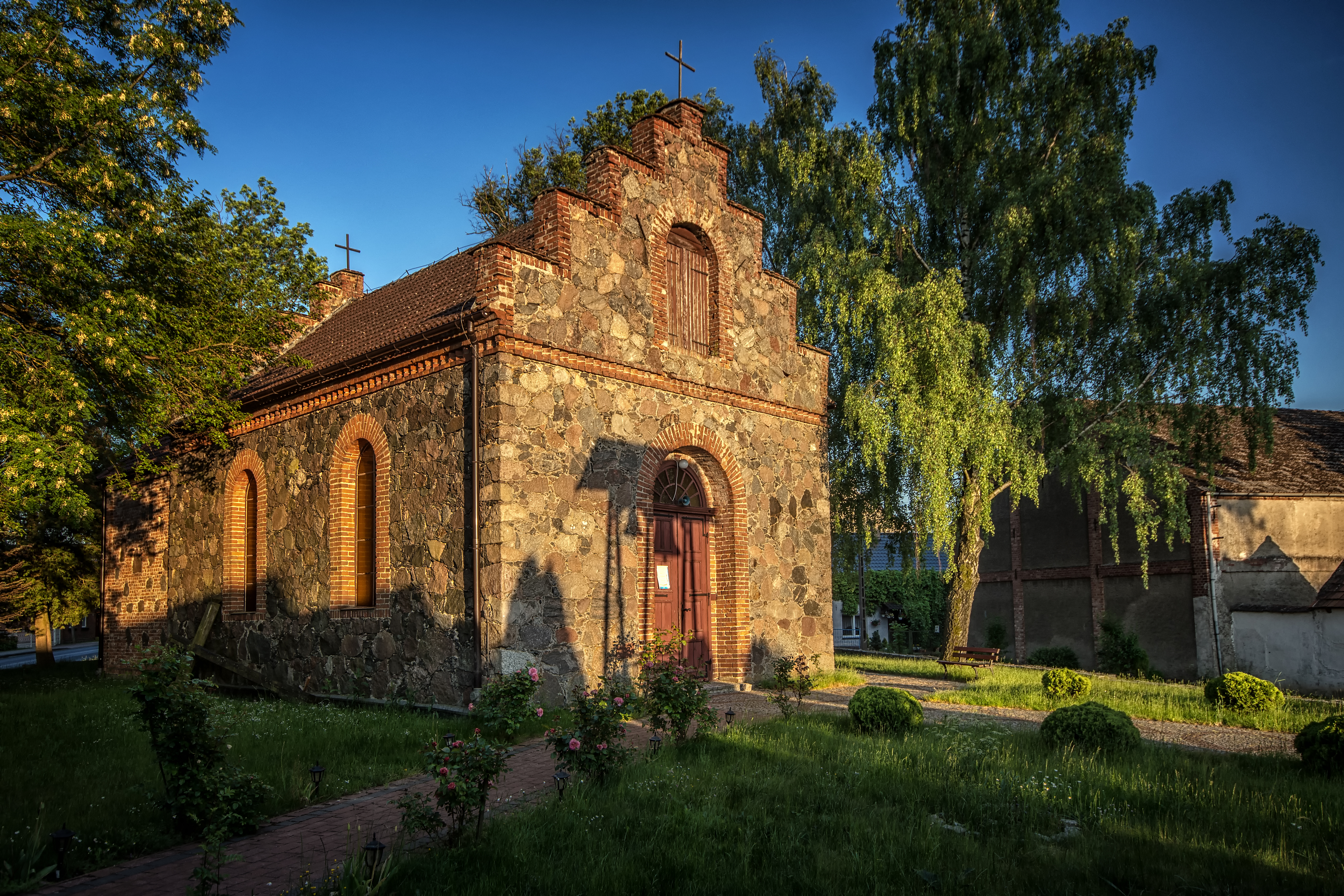
- Church of Our Lady of the Scapular

- Location within Poland
- Coordinates: 53°39′N 15°27′E
- Country: Poland
- Voivodeship: West Pomeranian
- County: Łobez
- Gmina: Radowo Małe

Population
  - Total: 1,200

Radowo Małe [raˈdɔvɔ ˈmawɛ] (German: Klein Raddow) is a village in Łobez County, West Pomeranian Voivodeship, in northwestern Poland. It is the seat of the gmina (administrative district) called Gmina Radowo Małe. It lies approximately 12 km (7 mi) west of Łobez and 63 km (39 mi) north-east of the regional capital Szczecin.

The village has a population of 1,200.
