= Drzewce =

Drzewce may refer to:

- Drzewce, Kuyavian-Pomeranian Voivodeship (north-central Poland)
- Drzewce, Łódź Voivodeship (central Poland)
- Drzewce, Lublin Voivodeship (east Poland)
- Drzewce, Gostyń County in Greater Poland Voivodeship (west-central Poland)
- Drzewce, Gmina Olszówka in Greater Poland Voivodeship (central Poland)
- Drzewce, Gmina Osiek Mały in Greater Poland Voivodeship (central Poland)
- Drzewce, Międzychód County in Greater Poland Voivodeship (west-central Poland)
- Drzewce, Słupca County in Greater Poland Voivodeship (west-central Poland)
- Drzewce, Lubusz Voivodeship (west Poland)

== See also ==
- Drzewica (disambiguation)
