= Gryżyna =

Gryżyna may refer to:

- Gryżyna, Greater Poland Voivodeship (west-central Poland)
- Gryżyna, Lubusz Voivodeship (west Poland)
- Gryżyna Landscape Park, a protected area in Lubusz Voivodeship
- Gryżyna, Warmian-Masurian Voivodeship (north Poland)
