= Struga (disambiguation) =

Struga is a town in Macedonia.

Struga may also refer to:

- Struga, Lower Silesian Voivodeship (south-west Poland)
- Struga, Łódź Voivodeship (central Poland)
- Struga, Lubusz Voivodeship (west Poland)
- Struga, Bytów County in Pomeranian Voivodeship (north Poland)
- Struga, Chojnice County in Pomeranian Voivodeship (north Poland)
- Struga, Kościerzyna County in Pomeranian Voivodeship (north Poland)
- Struga, West Pomeranian Voivodeship (north-west Poland)
- Struga, Szczecin, a part of the Szczecin City
- Struga Municipality, a municipality in western Republic of North Macedonia, the seat of which is Struga
- Struga (river), a river of Saxony, Germany
- Struga, Croatia, a village near Sveti Đurđ, Varaždin County, Croatia
- Struga Castle, a 16th century castle in Gumberk, Slovenia
