= Głębokie =

Głębokie may refer to the following places:

Poland

- Głębokie, Gniezno County in Greater Poland Voivodeship (west-central Poland)
- Głębokie, Koło County in Greater Poland Voivodeship (central Poland)
- Głębokie, Kuyavian-Pomeranian Voivodeship (central Poland)
- Głębokie, Lesser Poland Voivodeship (south Poland)
- Głębokie, Łęczna County in Lublin Voivodeship (east Poland)
- Głębokie, Lubartów County in Lublin Voivodeship (east Poland)
- Głębokie, Gmina Bytnica, Krosno County in Lubusz Voivodeship (west Poland)
- Głębokie, Międzyrzecz County in Lubusz Voivodeship (west Poland)
- Głębokie, Pomeranian Voivodeship (north Poland)
- Głębokie, Subcarpathian Voivodeship (south-east Poland)
- Głębokie, Drawsko County in West Pomeranian Voivodeship (north-west Poland)
- Głębokie, Pyrzyce County in West Pomeranian Voivodeship (north-west Poland)
- Głębokie, Szczecin, a neighbourhood in the city of Szczecin

Belarus

- Hlybokaye (Polish: Głębokie), a town in Vitebsk Oblast, Belarus
