= Alfred Budner =

Polish politician

member of Sejm 2005-2007
- Incumbent
- Assumed office 25 September 2005

Personal details
- Born: 30 August 1950 (age 76) Tomaszew, Poland
- Party: Samoobrona

Alfred Budner (born 30 August 1950) is a Polish politician. He was elected to Sejm on 25 September 2005, getting 16,075 votes in 37 Konin district as a candidate from Samoobrona Rzeczpospolitej Polskiej list.

He was also a member of Sejm 2001-2005.

== See also ==
- Members of Polish Sejm 2005-2007
