= Krushka brothers =

Pioneering family of tin miners and horse racing identities in Tasmania, Australia

The Krushka brothers were 19th-century Tasmanian settlers of Prussian origin, consisting of Christopher, Frederick, Charles, and William Krushka. They became prominent tin miners in north-eastern Tasmania after discovering and developing the Brothers' Home mine, one of the region’s richest tin deposits.

== Family and immigration ==
The Krushka family (originally recorded as Kruschke) emigrated from Rädnitz in the Prussian province of Brandenburg (now Radnica, Poland). Led by Christian Krushka and his wife Johanna, the family arrived in Hobart Town on 26 August 1855 aboard the ship Wilhelmsburg, which had departed from the Free and Hanseatic City of Hamburg. Christian had previously worked as a bargee on the Oder River. According to later accounts, the family left Prussia in part to avoid compulsory military service for their sons following the political unrest of the German revolutions of 1848–1849.

Upon arrival in the Colony of Tasmania, the family initially worked as manual labourers in the Coal Valley district before moving to north-eastern Tasmania in the 1870s. Contemporary and later newspaper accounts describe the family’s early years as marked by economic hardship.

A widely repeated anecdote claims that while working as harvest labourers near Longford, one of the brothers was shown kindness by a farmer’s daughter and later returned to marry her after the family had become established.

=== Tin mining and Brothers' Home ===
In June 1875, Christopher Krushka was prospecting with George Renison Bell when he identified potential deposits on the Cascade River. Christopher sent for his brothers, Frederick and Charles, who made the first discovery using an improvised wooden shovel carved from a sapling.

=== Innovation and production ===
The brothers’ operation was noted for blending their agricultural background with mining; they famously used horse-drawn harrows in their tail-races to loosen sand and settle the tin ore. By the 1880s, the mine was producing up to 40 tons of tin per week.

=== Sale to Briseis ===
In 1899, the brothers sold their "Home" claim to the London-based Briseis Tin Mines Ltd for approximately £95,000 (comprising £35,000 in cash and the remainder in shares). This sale facilitated the amalgamation of the region's mines into a large-scale industrial operation with a 30-mile-long head race.

While the brothers were celebrated for their wealth, they also faced significant risks; in 1886, a suspected arsonist destroyed a 100-ton hay stack and machinery at William Krushka's farm at Brothers' Home, causing £1,500 in uninsured losses.

=== Civic influence and town names ===
The Krushkas' influence is preserved in the geography of north-eastern Tasmania.

- Ringarooma: Christopher Krushka established a private township on family land in 1882, originally known as Krushka Town. In November 1888, the town was officially renamed Ringarooma. The name was transferred from a coastal port formerly known as Ringarooma, which was subsequently renamed Boobyalla. Christopher Krushka served as a trustee for the town hall and was a patron of the local cricket club.
- Moorina: The town was originally known as Krushka's Bridge, named for a temporary bridge the brothers built over the Ringarooma River to transport ore.
- Derby: The mining camp at the Brothers' Home mine was renamed Derby in 1888. An 1877 town map of Derby records the existence of Krushka Street.

== Horse-racing and later years ==
During the 1880s and 1890s, the Krushka brothers – Christopher, Charles, Frederick and William – raced a stable of thoroughbred horses in Tasmania. Some of their successes were:

- Charles Krushka won the Hobart Cup twice with his horses Maori Chief and Ballarat.
- Christopher Krushka achieved Tasmanian racing's highest honour in 1894 when his home-bred colt, Amadeus, won both the Hobart Cup and the Launceston Cup in the same year.

Following the Launceston Cup victory, Christopher famously celebrated by showering gold sovereigns from his hotel balcony onto the cheering crowd below. Their eventual departure from racing was described as a loss to the Tasmanian turf.

=== Military service ===
The family's connection to the Ringarooma district continued through successive generations:

- World War I: Private Horace Krushka served at Gallipoli and the Western Front.
- World War II: Brothers Bombardier Fred Krushka and Gunner Keith Krushka enlisted in 1939. They served together in the same battery through the campaigns in Greece, Crete, and Syria.
