= Morsko =

Morsko may refer to the following places:

- Morsko, Kanal ob Soči, a settlement on the left bank of the river Soča, south of Kanal ob Soči in the Littoral region of Slovenia
- Morsko, Lesser Poland Voivodeship, a village in the administrative district of Gmina Koszyce, within Proszowice County, Lesser Poland Voivodeship, in southern Poland
- Morsko, Lubusz Voivodeship, a village in the administrative district of Gmina Krosno Odrzańskie, within Krosno Odrzańskie County, Lubusz Voivodeship, in western Poland
- Morsko, Silesian Voivodeship, a village in the administrative district of Gmina Włodowice, within Zawiercie County, Silesian Voivodeship, in southern Poland
