= Czarnowo =

Czarnowo may refer to the following places:

- Czarnowo, Kuyavian-Pomeranian Voivodeship (north-central Poland)
- Czarnowo, Lubusz Voivodeship (west Poland)
- Czarnowo, Gmina Pomiechówek, Nowy Dwór County in Masovian Voivodeship (east-central Poland)
- Czarnowo, Ostrołęka County in Masovian Voivodeship (east-central Poland)
- Czarnowo, Podlaskie Voivodeship (north-east Poland)
- Czarnowo, Pomeranian Voivodeship (north Poland)
- Czarnowo, West Pomeranian Voivodeship (north-west Poland)
