= Gmina Krosno Odrzańskie =

Gmina Krosno Odrzańskie Krosno Odrzańskie Commune
- Gmina
- Coat of arms

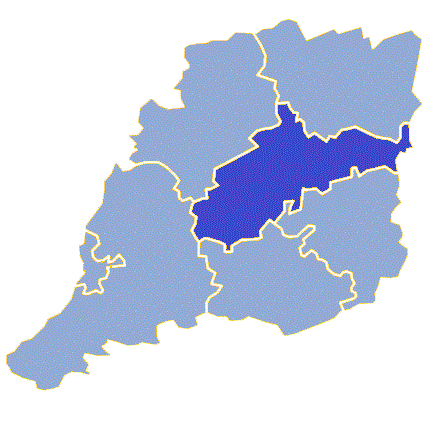
- Gmina Krosno Odrzańskie in Krosno Odrzańskie County
- Coordinates (Krosno Odrzańskie): 52°2′N 15°6′E
- Country: Poland
- Voivodeship: Lubusz
- County: Krosno
- Seat: Krosno Odrzańskie

Area
  - Total: 211.52 km^{2} (81.67 sq mi)

Population (2019-06-30)
  - Total: 17,784
  - Density: 84.077/km^{2} (217.76/sq mi)
  - Urban: 11,319
  - Rural: 6,465
- Website: www.krosnoodrzanskie.pl

Gmina Krosno Odrzańskie is an urban-rural gmina (administrative district) in Krosno County, Lubusz Voivodeship, in western Poland. Its seat is the town of Krosno Odrzańskie, which lies approximately 30 kilometres (19 mi) west of Zielona Góra.

The gmina covers an area of 211.52 square kilometres (81.7 sq mi), and as of 2019 its total population is 17,784.

The gmina contains part of the protected area called Gryżyna Landscape Park.

== Villages ==
Apart from the town of Krosno Odrzańskie, Gmina Krosno Odrzańskie contains the villages and settlements of Bielów, Brzózka, Chojna, Chyże, Czarnowo, Czetowice, Gostchorze, Kamień, Łochowice, Marcinowice, Morsko, Nowy Raduszec, Osiecznica, Radnica, Retno, Sarbia, Sarnie Łęgi, Stary Raduszec, Strumienno, Szklarka Radnicka and Wężyska.

== Neighbouring gminas ==
Gmina Krosno Odrzańskie is bordered by the gminas of Bobrowice, Bytnica, Czerwieńsk, Dąbie, Gubin and Maszewo.

== Twin towns – sister cities ==
Gmina Krosno Odrzańskie is twinned with:

- Bremervörde, Germany
- Karcag, Hungary
- Schwarzheide, Germany
