= Grabin (disambiguation) =

Vasiliy Grabin (1900–1980) was a Soviet artillery designer.

Grabin may also refer to the following places:

- Grabin, Lubusz Voivodeship (west Poland)
- Grabin, Opole Voivodeship (south-west Poland)
- Grabin, Pomeranian Voivodeship (north Poland)
- Grabin, Warmian-Masurian Voivodeship (north Poland)
- Grabin, West Pomeranian Voivodeship (north-west Poland)
- Grabin, Polish and Sorbian name for the town of Finsterwalde (east Germany)

== See also ==
- Graben
