= Gryżyna Landscape Park =

Protected area in Lubusz Voivodeship, Poland

Coordinates: 52.1333°N 15.275°E

- Gryżyński Park Krajobrazowy
- IUCN category V (protected landscape/seascape)
- Interactive map of Gryżyna Landscape Park
- Location: Lubusz Voivodeship
- Area: 27.55 km^{2} (10.64 sq mi)
- Established: 1996

Gryżyna Landscape Park (Gryżyński Park Krajobrazowy) is a protected area (Landscape Park) in western Poland, established in 1996, covering an area of 27.55 square kilometres (10.64 sq mi).

The Park lies within Lubusz Voivodeship: in Krosno County (Gmina Krosno Odrzańskie, Gmina Bytnica), Świebodzin County (Gmina Skąpe) and Zielona Góra County (Gmina Czerwieńsk). It takes its name from the village of Gryżyna in Gmina Bytnica. Gryżyński Landscape Park is covered with forests in 86.6%, with surface waters in 6.6% and in 2.6% with pastures and meadows and marshy wasteland. The park is situated in the Warsaw-Berlin ice-marginal-valley and it constitutes a good example of postglacial relief with a great variety of postglacial forms such as vales, eskers and ravines, which contrast with sander plains around the park. The park is extended from the village Gryżyna in the north to the village Szklarka Radnicka in the south. It is 2-3 kilometers wide and 12.5 kilometers long, and the vale of Gryżyna is its axis. The western vale constitutes the riverbed for Gryżyński Potok. This peat bog area is cut with ravines with steep slopes and huge amount of slope springs (there are nearly 100 between the villages Gryżyna and Grabin). In the south there are a few postglacial lakes and the biggest is the lake Jelito, which is 36.6 meters deep and covers the area of 49.9 hectares. To the east of the central and the western vales there are eskers, the kettle holes and kames with the dominant Border Mountain. In the beautiful landscape of the northern part of the park a 7.5- kilometre path of nature has been marked up with ten stands described by means of seventeen tables. The path is marked with the symbol of a green leaf.

The stands relate to different topics:

1. The holiday camp "Dora" in Gryżyna
2. The watermill Strzelnik
3. The ravines with 60% inclination
4. The slope springs
5. The fen
6. The kame edge
7. The watermill Zaskórz
8. The esker inside the vale
9. The pond Bartno
10. The lake Kalek.

== The natural monuments ==
In the park there are 4 avenues of oaks and one tree - a pedunculate oak - protected in the form of natural monuments. The avenues are grouped in the area of Gryżyna village, they gather about 300 trees and with its longevity (150–200 years) and size (20 –25 metres high and 180-400 centimetres of circumference) they are considered an amazing natural phenomenon. Another natural monument is the deepest and the most beautiful ravine, which was created by water after the glacier had retreated. The western and central part of the ravine is covered by the beech forest. In the eastern part, on the peat bogs, black alders grow. The Rashes of Gryżyna cover 32,86 hectares and are located in the postglacial valley near the springs of Gryżyński Potok. The wet and inaccessible ground is the home for animals, particularly a biever, an otter and a crane. The Cranberry Marsh covers 2,81 hectares and is the habitat of the sundews, the mud sedge, the cranberry, the bog-rosemary and the white beat sedge. The park provides protection for the nests of a white-tailed eagle.

== The flora of Gryżyński Landscape Park ==
Among trees of Gryżyński Landscape Park the following species can be found : pines, European and red beeches, oaks, alders and hornbeams. Common leptosporangiate ferns and umbellate wintergreen represent interesting and rare species in the park. There is also an old species wolf's-foot clubmoss. Among flowers there are : Carthusian Pink, Cheddar Pink, anemones, snowdrops, blue squills and liverworts. The wet meadows near Grabin are the habitat of a common foxglove and a wide range of orchids, for instance a military orchid. The peat bogs areas are covered with a mud sedge, the sundews, a cranberry and a bog-rosemary.

== The fauna of Gryżyński Landscape Park ==
The diverse forms of postglacial relief serve as a shelter for plenty of animal species. The park is the habitat of a stag beetle. During June and July, one can see the beetles in the near of oaks. Other insects are a European pine processionary and a moaning cloak – the biggest butterfly in Poland. A lot of places reveal the trace of beavers, which were introduced to the park in 1986. In the same places, otters are found. Another mammals characteristic for the park are red and roe deer, a red fox, a wild boar, a raccoon dog, a European polecat, a beech marten and a European badger.

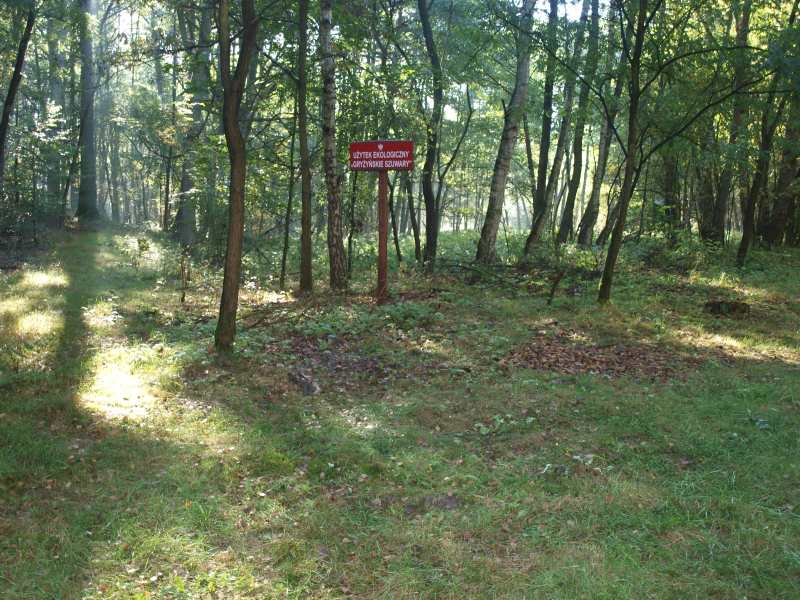
The Rushes of Gryżyna

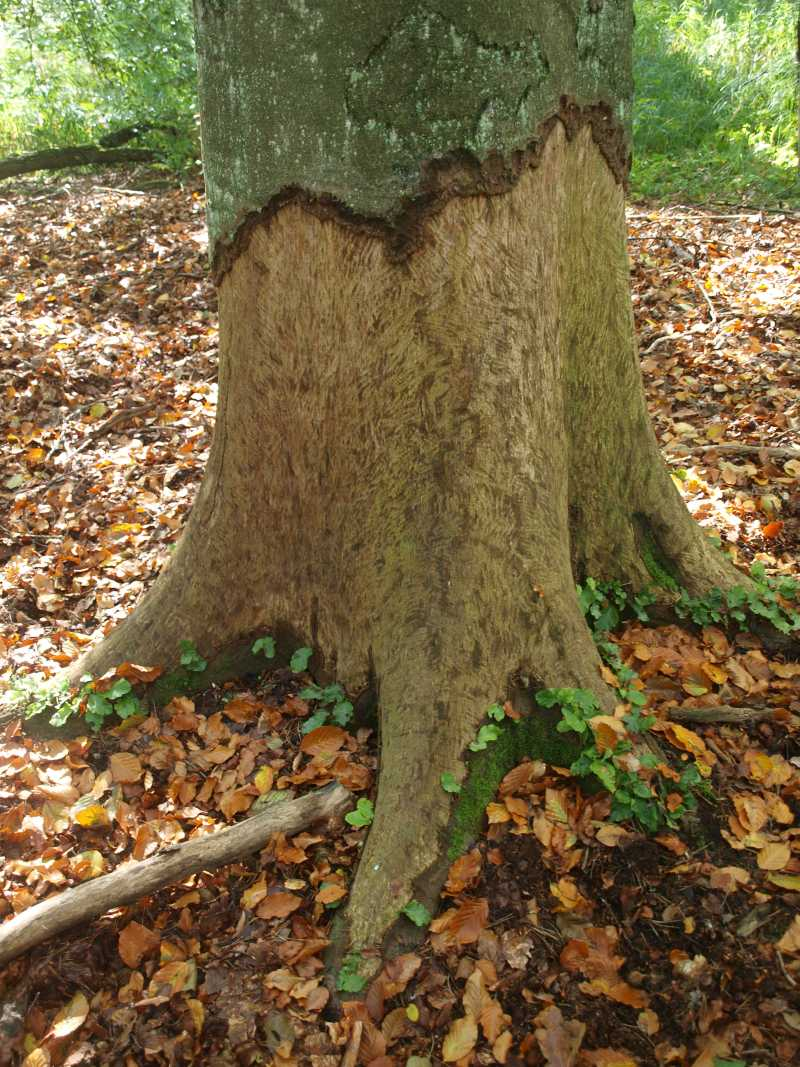
A tree cut by the beaver

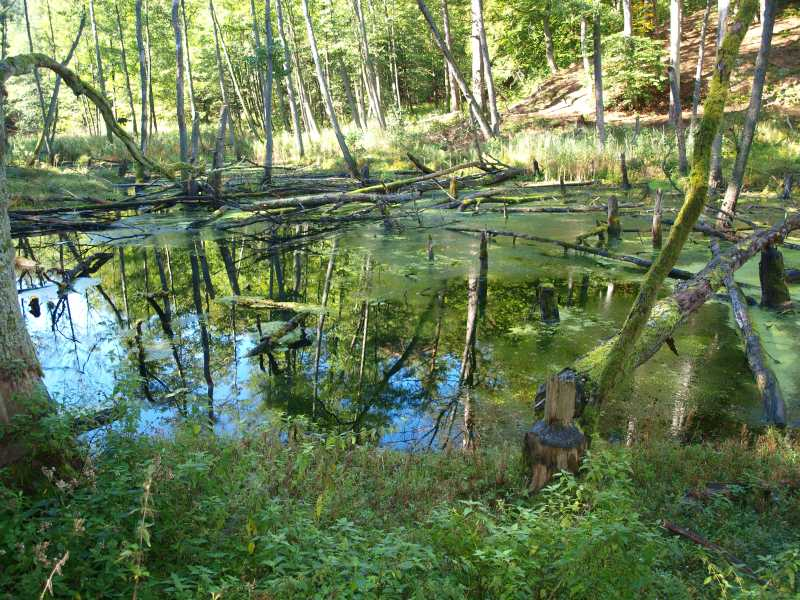
A pond inhabited by beavers

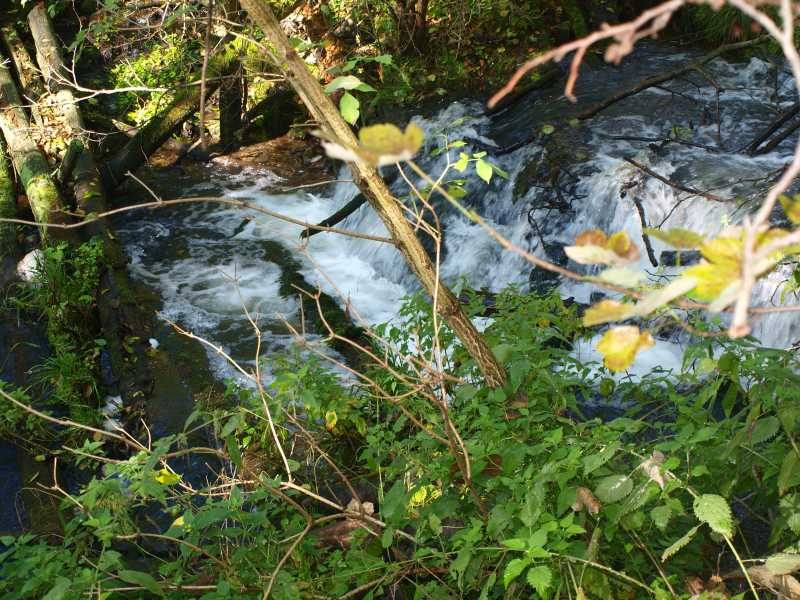
The cataracts on the river Gryżynka

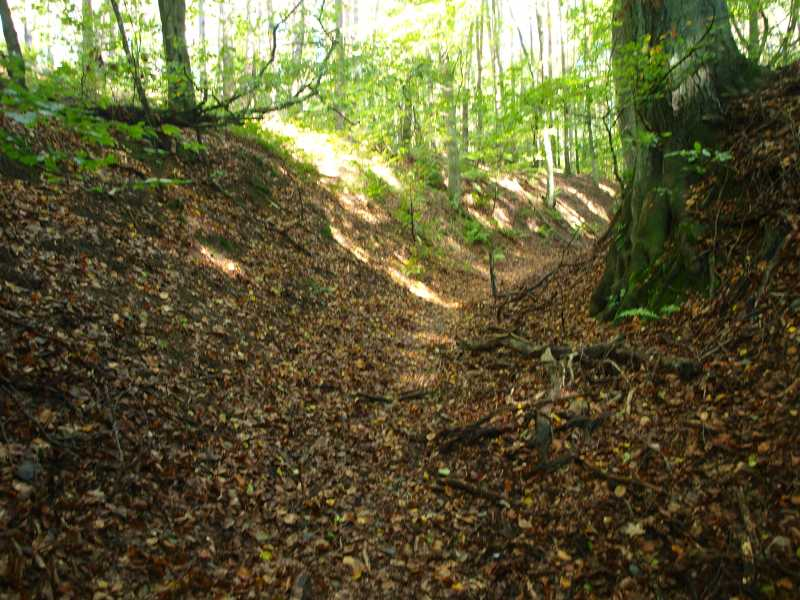
A ravine carved by the waters after the glacier had retreated

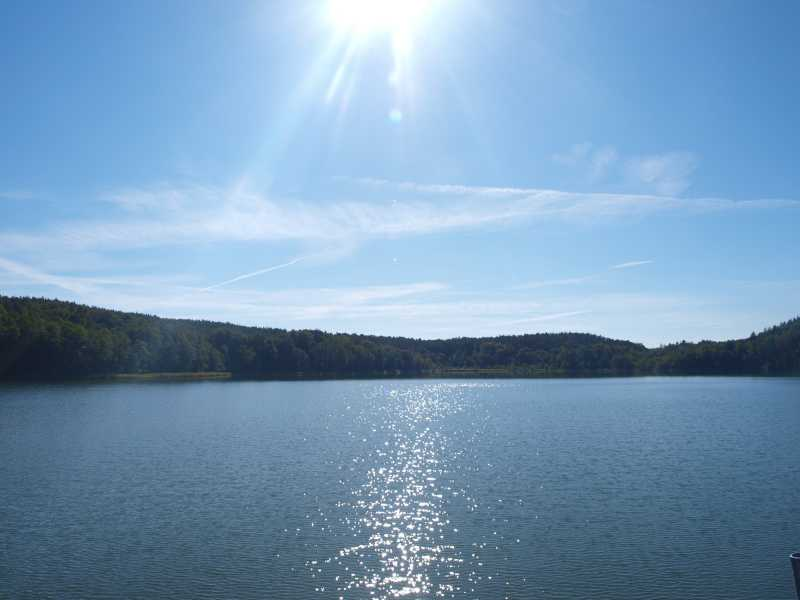
The lake Kałek
