= Osiecznica =

Osiecznica may refer to the following villages in Poland:

- Osiecznica, Lower Silesian Voivodeship (south-west Poland)
- Osiecznica, Lubusz Voivodeship (west Poland)
