= Kępiny =

Kępiny may refer to the following places:

- Kępiny, Lubusz Voivodeship (west Poland)
- Kępiny, Masovian Voivodeship (east-central Poland)
- Kępiny, West Pomeranian Voivodeship (north-west Poland)
