= Ostrów, Greater Poland Voivodeship =

Ostrów
- Village
- Location within Poland
- Coordinates: 52°8′56″N 18°49′4″E
- Country: Poland
- Voivodeship: Greater Poland
- County: Koło
- Gmina: Olszówka
- Population: 350
- Time zone: UTC+1 (CET)
  - Summer (DST): UTC+2 (CEST)

Ostrów [ˈɔstruf] is a village in the administrative district of Gmina Olszówka, within Koło County, Greater Poland Voivodeship, in central Poland.
