= Sarnie Łęgi =

- Settlement
- Location within Poland
- Coordinates: 52°00′N 14°59′E
- Country: Poland
- Voivodeship: Lubusz
- County: Krosno
- Gmina: Krosno Odrzańskie

Sarnie Łęgi ([ˈsarɲɛ ˈwɛnɡi]; German: Rehlang) is a settlement in the administrative district of Gmina Krosno Odrzańskie, within Krosno County, Lubusz Voivodeship, in western Poland.
