= Smolary Bytnickie =

- Village
- Location within Poland
- Coordinates: 52°10′36″N 15°12′31″E
- Country: Poland
- Voivodeship: Lubusz
- County: Krosno
- Gmina: Bytnica

Smolary Bytnickie ([smɔˈlarɨ bɨtˈnit͡skʲɛ]; German: Teerofen) is a village in the administrative district of Gmina Bytnica, within Krosno County, Lubusz Voivodeship, in western Poland.
