= Strumienno, Lubusz Voivodeship =

Strumienno
- Village
- Location within Poland
- Coordinates: 52°3′N 15°1′E
- Country: Poland
- Voivodeship: Lubusz
- County: Krosno
- Gmina: Krosno Odrzańskie

Strumienno ([struˈmjɛnnɔ]; German: Pfeifferhahn) is a village in the administrative district of Gmina Krosno Odrzańskie, within Krosno County, Lubusz Voivodeship, in western Poland.
