= Szklarka, Lubusz Voivodeship =

Szklarka
- Village
- Location within Poland
- Coordinates: 52°05′45″N 15°15′55″E
- Country: Poland
- Voivodeship: Lubusz
- County: Krosno
- Gmina: Bytnica

Szklarka ([ˈʂklarka]; German: Rädnitzer Hüttenwerke) is a village in the administrative district of Gmina Bytnica, within Krosno County, Lubusz Voivodeship, in western Poland.
