= Gostchorze =

- Village
- Location within Poland
- Coordinates: 52°3′N 15°10′E
- Country: Poland
- Voivodeship: Lubusz
- County: Krosno
- Gmina: Krosno Odrzańskie

Gostchorze ([ɡɔstˈxɔʐɛ]; German: Goskar) is a village in the administrative district of Gmina Krosno Odrzańskie, within Krosno County, Lubusz Voivodeship, in western Poland.
