= Garbowo, Lubusz Voivodeship =

Garbowo
- Settlement
- Location within Poland
- Coordinates: 52°11′00″N 15°13′00″E
- Country: Poland
- Voivodeship: Lubusz
- County: Krosno
- Gmina: Bytnica

Garbowo ([ɡarˈbɔvɔ]; German: Richtershof) is a settlement in the administrative district of Gmina Bytnica, within Krosno County, Lubusz Voivodeship, in western Poland.
