= Gmina Bytnica =

Gmina Bytnica Bytnica Commune
- Gmina
- Flag Coat of arms
- Interactive map of Gmina Bytnica
- Coordinates (Bytnica): 52°9′0″N 15°10′0″E
- Country: Poland
- Voivodeship: Lubusz
- County: Krosno
- Seat: Bytnica

Area
  - Total: 208.74 km^{2} (80.59 sq mi)

Population (2019-06-30)
  - Total: 2,512
  - Density: 12.03/km^{2} (31.17/sq mi)
- Website: https://bytnica.pl/

Gmina Bytnica is a rural gmina (administrative district) in Krosno County, Lubusz Voivodeship, in western Poland. Its seat is the village of Bytnica, which lies approximately 14 kilometres (9 mi) north of Krosno Odrzańskie, 33 km (21 mi) north-west of Zielona Góra, and 65 km (40 mi) south of Gorzów Wielkopolski.

The gmina covers an area of 208.74 square kilometres (80.6 sq mi), and as of 2019 its total population is 2,512.

The gmina contains part of the protected area called Gryżyna Landscape Park.

== Villages ==
Gmina Bytnica contains the villages and settlements of Budachów, Dobrosułów, Drzewica, Garbowo, Głębokie, Grabin, Gryżyna, Kępiny, Pliszka, Smolary Bytnickie, Struga and Szklarka.

== Neighbouring gminas ==
Gmina Bytnica is bordered by the gminas of Czerwieńsk, Krosno Odrzańskie, Łagów, Maszewo, Skąpe and Torzym.
