= Ringarooma =

- Town
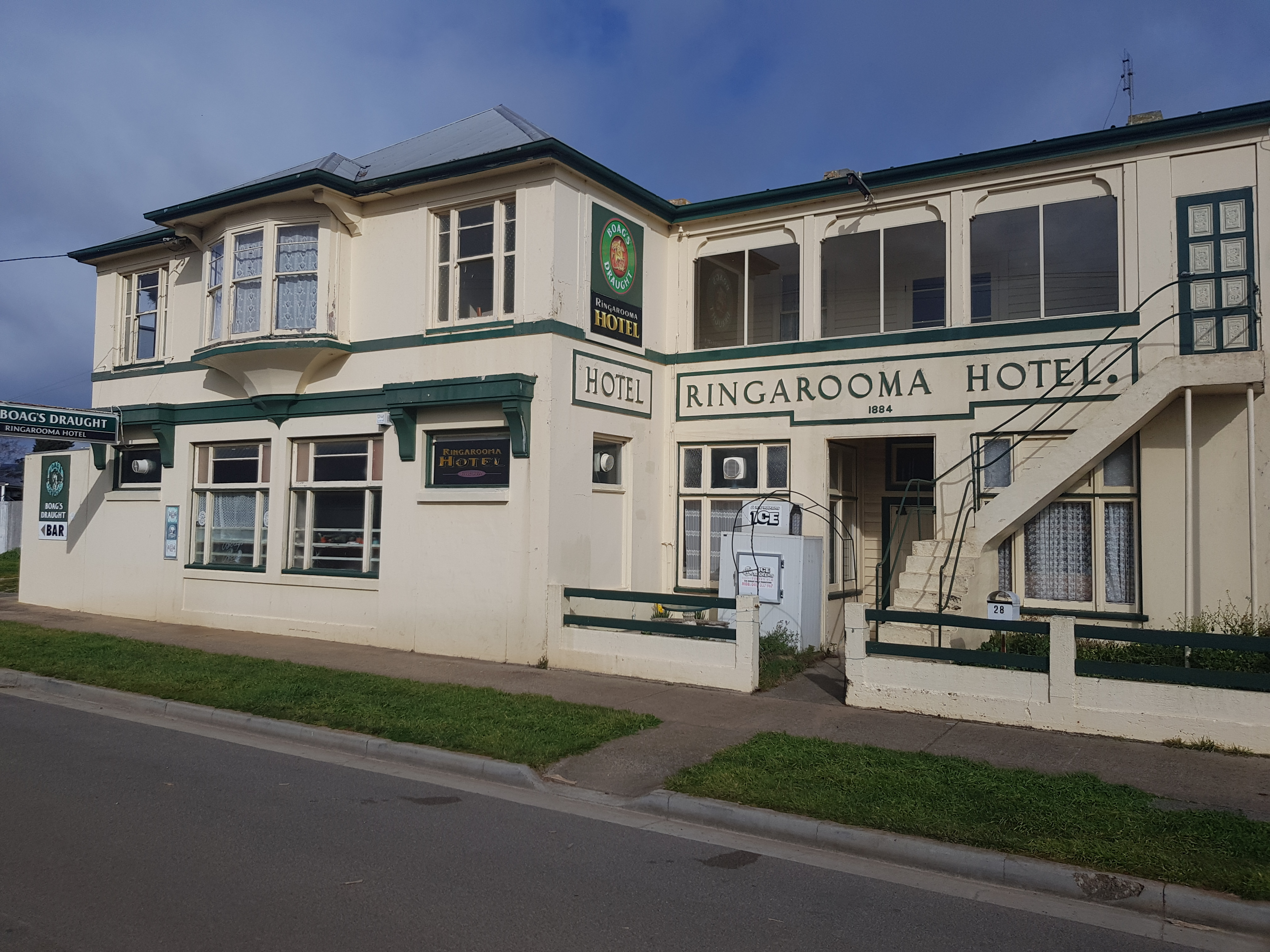
- The Ringarooma Hotel, a central landmark in the town

- Coordinates: 41°14′S 147°40′E
- Country: Australia
- State: Tasmania
- LGA: Dorset Council
- Location: 89 km (55 mi) NE of Launceston; 26 km (16 mi) SW of Derby; 61 km (38 mi) E of St Helens
- Established: 1882

Government
  - State electorate: Bass
  - Federal division: Bass
- Elevation: 283 m (928 ft)

Population
  - Total: 395 (2021)
- Postcode: 7263

Ringarooma is a town and locality in the North East region of Tasmania, Australia. It is situated in the fertile valley of the Ringarooma River, on the edge of the Blue Tier mountain range. The town was founded as a private township in 1882 by the pioneering Krushka brothers, whose enterprise was funded by the region's tin mining boom. At the 2021 census, the locality of Ringarooma had a population of 395. The town is located 89 km (55 mi) north-east of Launceston.

The local economy is predominantly based on dairy farming and logging, with a growing tourism sector driven by the area's natural attractions. The locality is primarily within the Dorset Council local government area, with a small eastern portion (approximately 2.5%) belonging to the Break O'Day Council.

== History ==
=== Exploration and early settlement ===
The area's rich soil was first identified by Europeans during explorations in the 1850s. Surveyor James Scott is credited with exploring the district, which he named the "Ringarooma country". In 1856, James Reid Scott, nephew of the explorer, blazed a track to Ringarooma, which was soon followed by a government grant of £100 in 1859 to construct a road from Launceston, cut through dense forest.

Pioneer Thomas Hogarth claimed to have felled the first tree for clearing purposes in 1860. The first permanent settlers arrived in the 1860s, establishing farms to cultivate the rich soil. In 1864, Robert Boyd commenced clearing operations at the Legerwood estate for James Scott, while James Bulman began clearing the Branxholm estate for J. R. Scott. The district's isolation meant early settlers faced significant hardship; transport of rations from Bridport cost £13 per ton, and the first ploughs were laboriously brought to the area in 1866.

=== The tin boom and founding of Krushka Town ===
The discovery of rich tin deposits at nearby Derby in the 1870s triggered a mining boom that transformed the region. Ringarooma flourished as a vital agricultural district, supplying the miners with food and provisions. Central to this development were the Krushka brothers, a family of Prussian immigrants who discovered the enormously wealthy Brothers' Home tin mine at Derby in 1875. Using their new fortune, they invested heavily in the Ringarooma district, buying and clearing large tracts of land for farming.

In 1882, one of the brothers, Christopher Krushka, led an initiative to establish a private township to serve the growing community. He subdivided his farm property and, on 4 March 1882, auctioned 50 town allotments. The settlement was initially known as Krushka, or Krushka's Town. Reflecting the family's influence, the town plan featured streets named for two of the other brothers, Frederick and Charles.

In November 1888, the town was officially renamed Ringarooma. This name was transferred from a coastal port which was then renamed Boobyalla. The name "Ringarooma" is believed to be derived from a local palawa kante word, popularly translated as "happy hunting ground" or "running water".

Ringarooma Post Office opened on 1 October 1874 and was known as Ringarooma (Krushkas) between 1884 and 1885.

== Geography ==
Ringarooma is situated in what was described in the 1920s as "a big basin surrounded by the everlasting hills". The area is known for its deep, fertile, dark-red basaltic soils (or "chocolate soil"), which support high-quality pastures and crops. The town lies just east of the Ringarooma River. This river, along with the nearby Dorset River, flows through the district before emptying into Bass Strait at Boobyalla. Above the influence of mining activities downstream at Branxholm, the river at Ringarooma runs clear.

== Economy and community ==
The foundation of Ringarooma's agricultural prosperity was laid by early settlers and accelerated by the large-scale land clearing and investment from figures like the Krushka brothers. The dairy industry remains central to the town's identity and economy. Historically, Ringarooma supported two butter factories and was renowned for its cheese production. In 2017, in recognition of its long history and strong community engagement with the industry, Ringarooma was named the "Legendairy Capital of Tasmania". Sustainable forestry is also a major employer in the region, with large quantities of timber historically dispatched from the nearby Legerwood railway station.

The town serves as a local service centre and includes a primary school, a hotel, a general store and a community hall. According to the 2021 census, the median age in Ringarooma was 51. The primary ancestries were Australian (47.0%), English (45.7%), and Scottish (15.5%). 84.1% of residents were born in Australia.

== Attractions ==
Ringarooma is a gateway to several significant natural attractions, particularly waterfalls located in the nearby mountains.

- Ralphs Falls and Cashs Gorge are located in the Mount Victoria Forest Reserve, about 15 km (9.3 mi) south-east of the town. At over 90 metres, Ralphs Falls is one of Tasmania's tallest waterfalls. A network of walking tracks provides access to lookouts over the falls and a loop walk through Cashs Gorge.
- St Columba Falls State Reserve is located near the town of Pyengana, approximately 25 km (16 mi) by road from Ringarooma. The reserve protects St Columba Falls, one of Tasmania's highest waterfalls, with a drop of over 90 metres.

The surrounding mountains, including Mount Victoria and the Blue Tier, offer opportunities for bushwalking and exploring diverse forest ecosystems.

== Access ==
Route C432 (New River Road) provides access from Mathinna, and Legerwood. Route C427 (E Maurice Road) provides access from Talawa.

== Notable people ==
- Bartlett Adamson (1884–1951) – journalist, poet, author and political activist, was born in Ringarooma.
- Alfred Gaby (1892–1918) – recipient of the Victoria Cross for actions during World War I, was born at Springfield, near Ringarooma.
- Samuel Hawkes (1842–1927) – the first Member of the Tasmanian House of Assembly for the electoral district of Ringarooma.
- Alan Lindsay Wardlaw (1907–1970) – pastoralist, soldier and parliamentarian, managed Mineral Banks, a farm in the Ringarooma district.
