= Nowa Wioska, Greater Poland Voivodeship =

Nowa Wioska
- Village
- Location within Poland
- Coordinates: 52°12′14″N 18°56′02″E
- Country: Poland
- Voivodeship: Greater Poland
- County: Koło
- Gmina: Olszówka
- Time zone: UTC+1 (CET)
  - Summer (DST): UTC+2 (CEST)
- Vehicle registration: PKL

Nowa Wioska [ˈnɔva ˈvjɔska] is a village in the administrative district of Gmina Olszówka, within Koło County, Greater Poland Voivodeship, in central Poland.
