= Sarbia, Lubusz Voivodeship =

Sarbia
- Village
- Location within Poland
- Coordinates: 52°2′N 14°59′E
- Country: Poland
- Voivodeship: Lubusz
- County: Krosno
- Gmina: Krosno Odrzańskie

Sarbia ([ˈsarbja]; German: Münchsdorf) is a village in the administrative district of Gmina Krosno Odrzańskie, within Krosno County, Lubusz Voivodeship, in western Poland.
