= Wężyska =

- Village
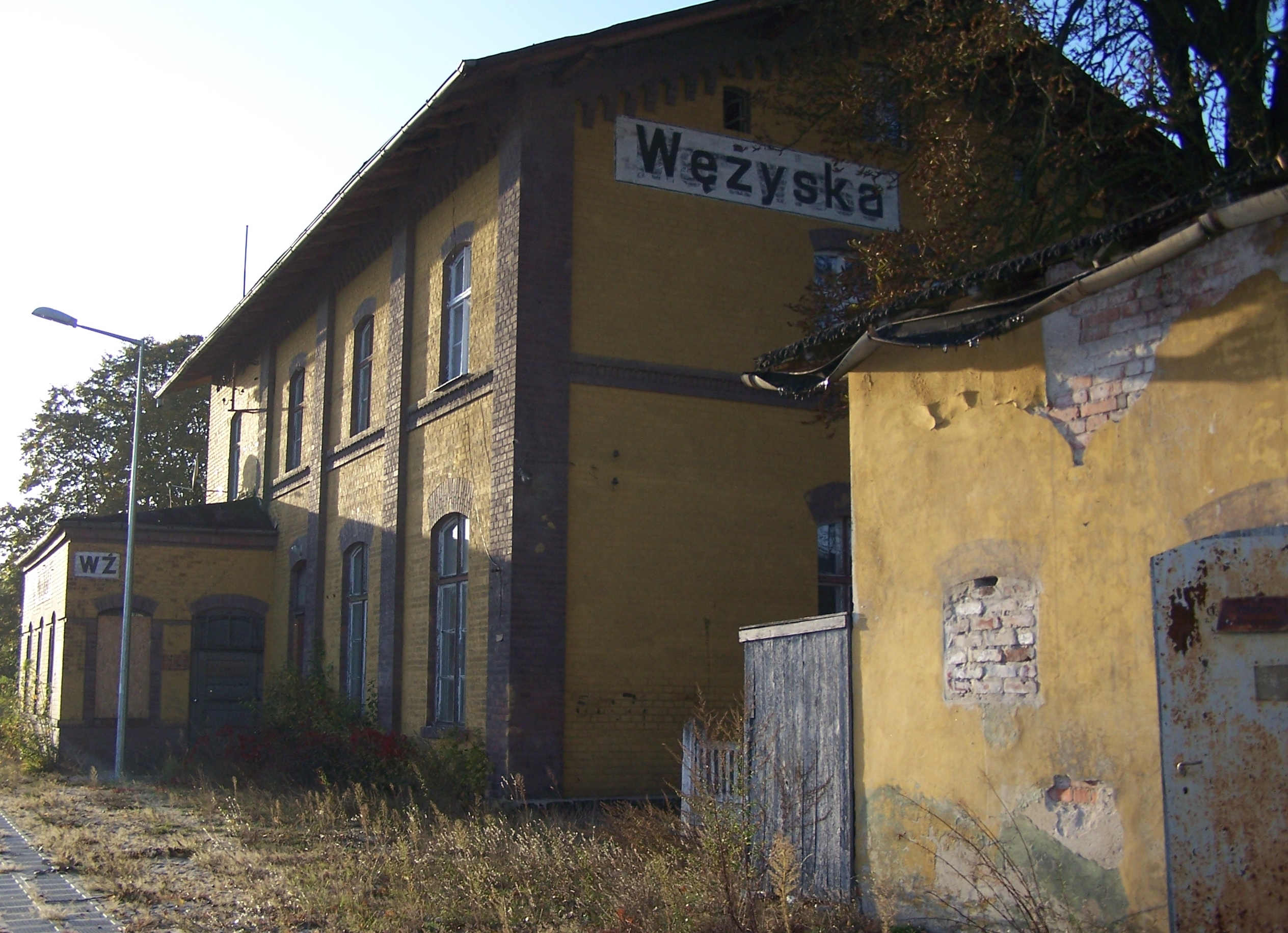
- Railway station

- Location within Poland
- Coordinates: 52°1′N 14°57′E
- Country: Poland
- Voivodeship: Lubusz
- County: Krosno
- Gmina: Krosno Odrzańskie

Wężyska ([vɛ̃ˈʐɨska]; German: Merzwiese) is a village in the administrative district of Gmina Krosno Odrzańskie, within Krosno County, Lubusz Voivodeship, in western Poland.
