= Gmina Olszówka =

Gmina Olszówka Olszówka Commune
- Gmina
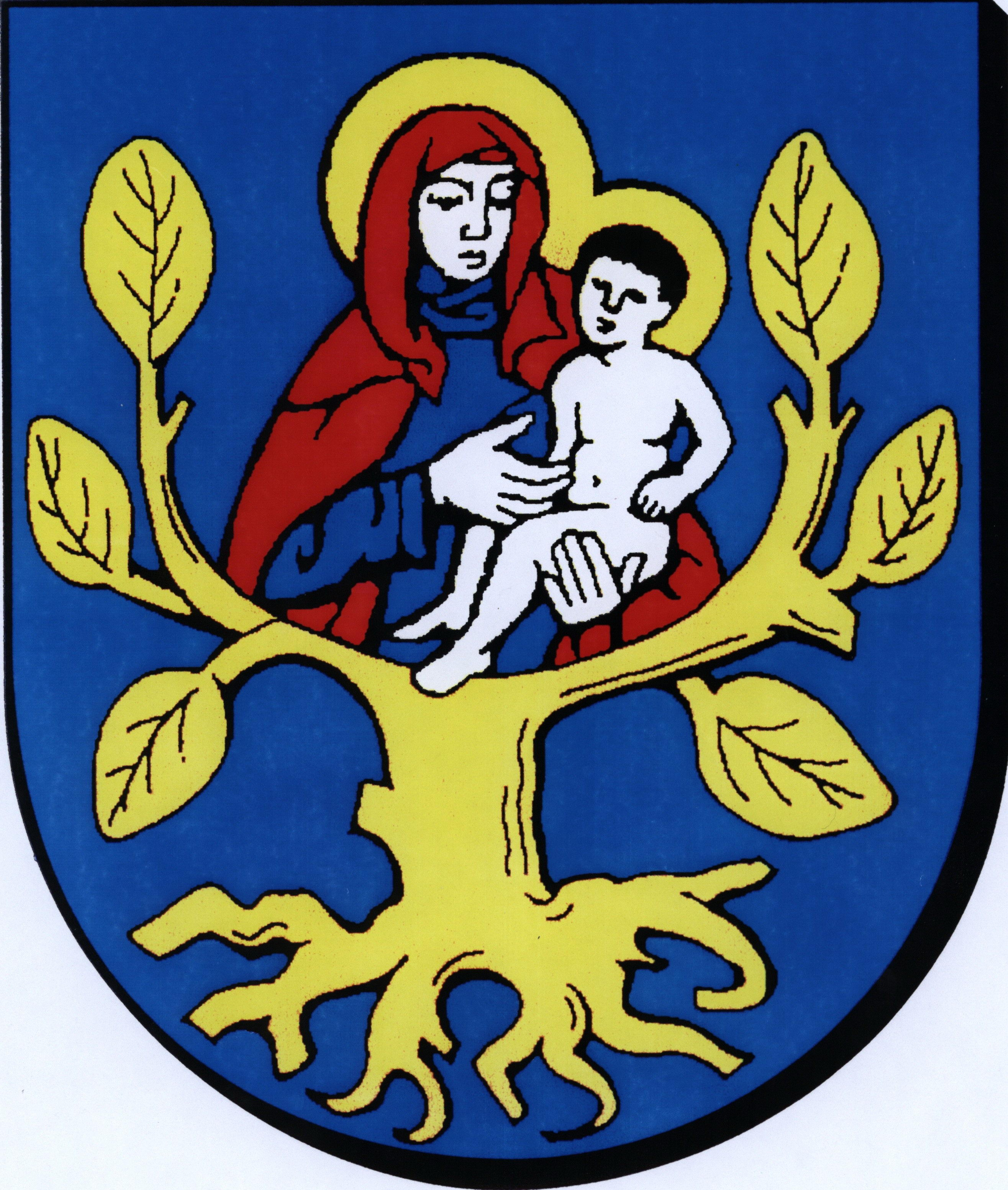
- Coat of arms

- Coordinates (Olszówka): 52°11′N 18°50′E
- Country: Poland
- Voivodeship: Greater Poland
- County: Koło
- Seat: Olszówka

Area
  - Total: 81.54 km^{2} (31.48 sq mi)

Population (2006)
  - Total: 4,757
  - Density: 58.34/km^{2} (151.1/sq mi)
- Time zone: UTC+1 (CET)
  - Summer (DST): UTC+2 (CEST)
- Vehicle registration: PKL
- Website: http://www.olszowka.bazagmin.pl/

Gmina Olszówka is a rural gmina (administrative district) in Koło County, Greater Poland Voivodeship, in central Poland. Its seat is the village of Olszówka, which lies approximately 14 kilometres (9 mi) east of Koło and 133 km (83 mi) east of the regional capital Poznań.

The gmina covers an area of 81.54 square kilometres (31.5 sq mi), and as of 2006 its total population is 4,757.

== Villages ==
Gmina Olszówka contains the villages and settlements of Adamin, Dębowiczki, Drzewce, Głębokie, Grabina, Krzewata, Łubianka, Młynik, Mniewo, Nowa Wioska, Olszówka, Ostrów, Ponętów Górny Drugi, Ponętów Górny Pierwszy, Przybyszew, Szczepanów, Tomaszew, Umień, Zawadka and Złota.

== Neighbouring gminas ==
Gmina Olszówka is bordered by the gminas of Dąbie, Grabów, Grzegorzew and Kłodawa.
