= Pliszka =

- Settlement
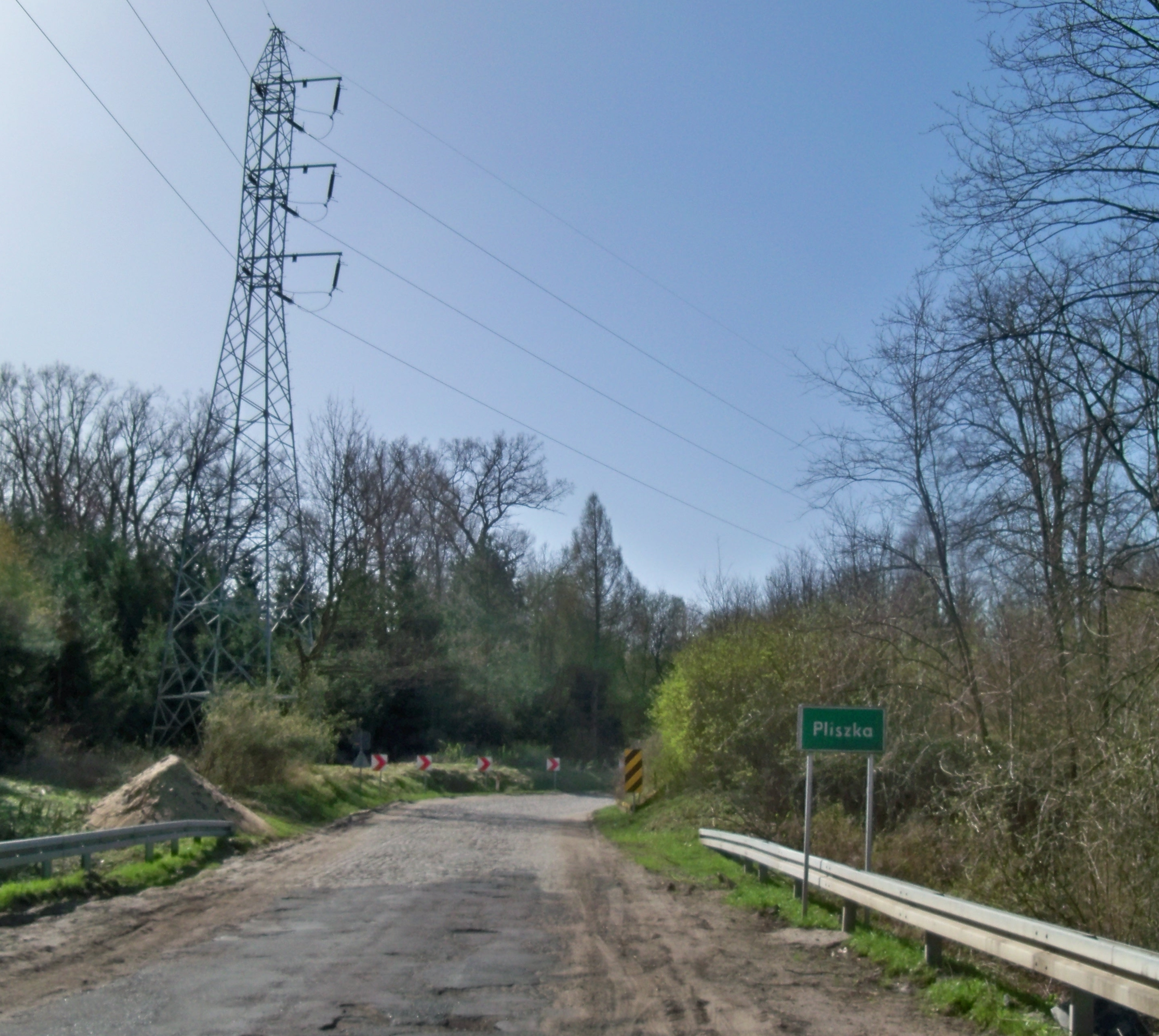

- Location within Poland
- Coordinates: 52°13′23″N 15°3′0″E
- Country: Poland
- Voivodeship: Lubusz
- County: Krosno
- Gmina: Bytnica
- Population: 30
- Time zone: UTC+1 (CET)
  - Summer (DST): UTC+2 (CEST)
- Vehicle registration: FKR

Pliszka ([ˈpliʂka]; German: Pleiske) is a settlement in the administrative district of Gmina Bytnica, within Krosno County, Lubusz Voivodeship, in western Poland.

The road connection is by the road Nr. DW138 which bridges the river Pliszka here. The Pliszka train station is 4 kilometres far away and has connection to Zielona Gora, Rzepin or Frankfurt on the Oder.
