= Ponętów Górny Drugi =

- Village
- Location within Poland
- Coordinates: 52°12′N 18°49′E
- Country: Poland
- Voivodeship: Greater Poland
- County: Koło
- Gmina: Olszówka
- Population: 230
- Time zone: UTC+1 (CET)
  - Summer (DST): UTC+2 (CEST)
- Vehicle registration: PKL

Ponętów Górny Drugi [pɔˈnɛntuf ˈɡurnɨ ˈdruɡi] is a village in the administrative district of Gmina Olszówka, within Koło County, Greater Poland Voivodeship, in central Poland.
