= Olszówka, Koło County =

Olszówka
- Village
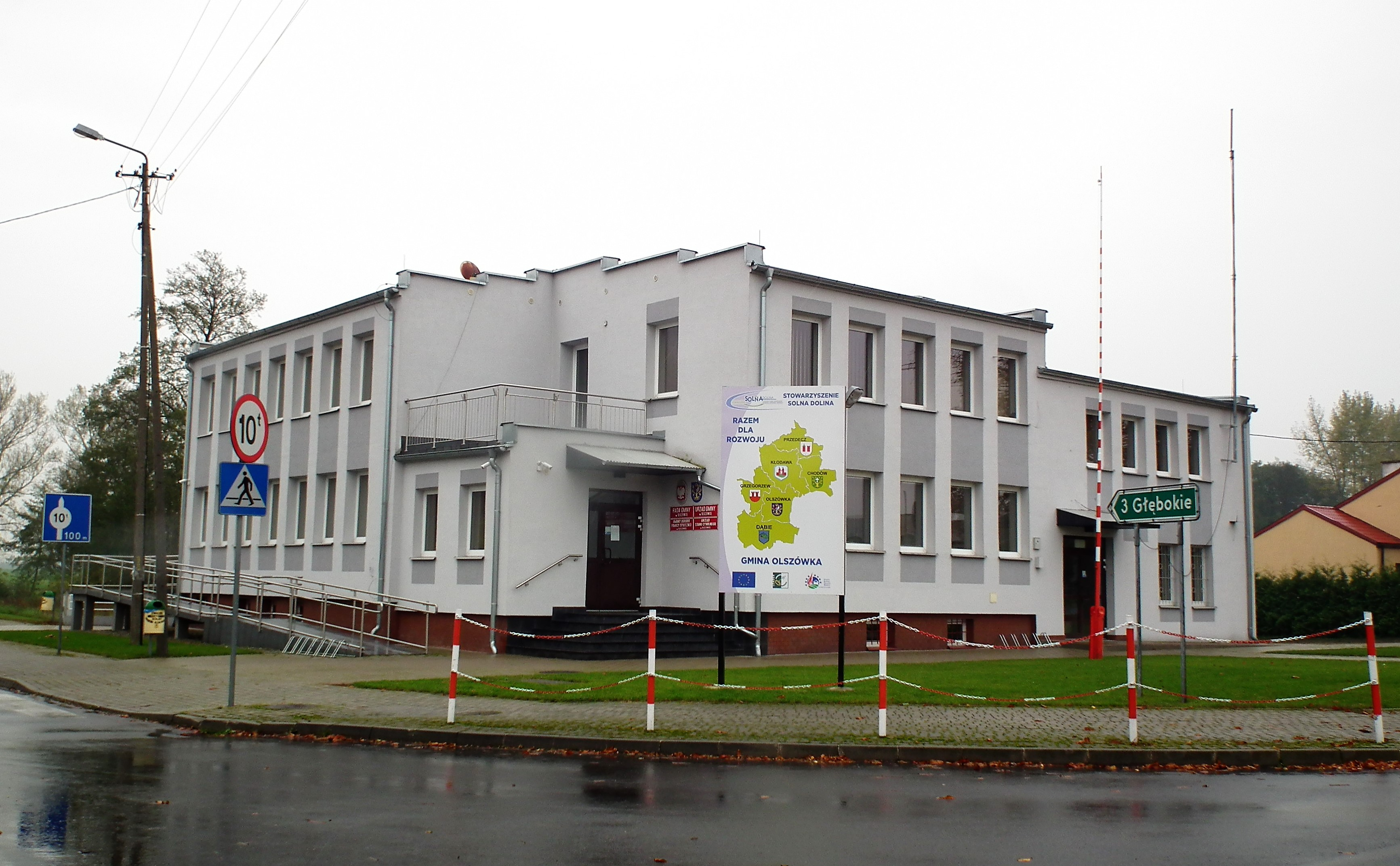
- Gmina Olszówka administration building

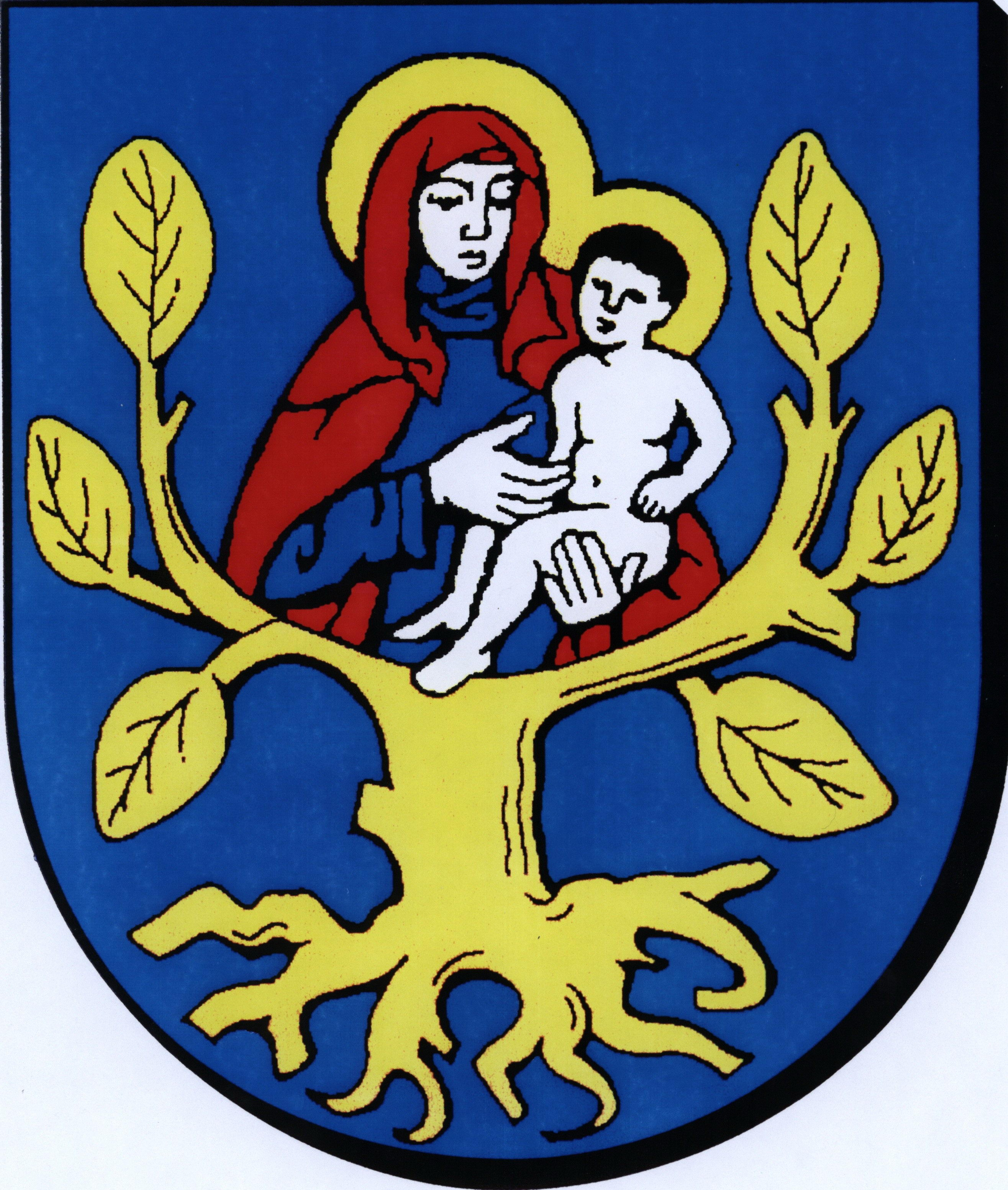
- Coat of arms

- Location within Poland
- Coordinates: 52°11′N 18°50′E
- Country: Poland
- Voivodeship: Greater Poland
- County: Koło
- Gmina: Olszówka

Population
  - Total: 440
- Time zone: UTC+1 (CET)
  - Summer (DST): UTC+2 (CEST)
- Vehicle registration: PKL

Olszówka [ɔlˈʂufka] is a village in Koło County, Greater Poland Voivodeship, in central Poland. It is the seat of the gmina (administrative district) called Gmina Olszówka.
