= Umień =

- Village
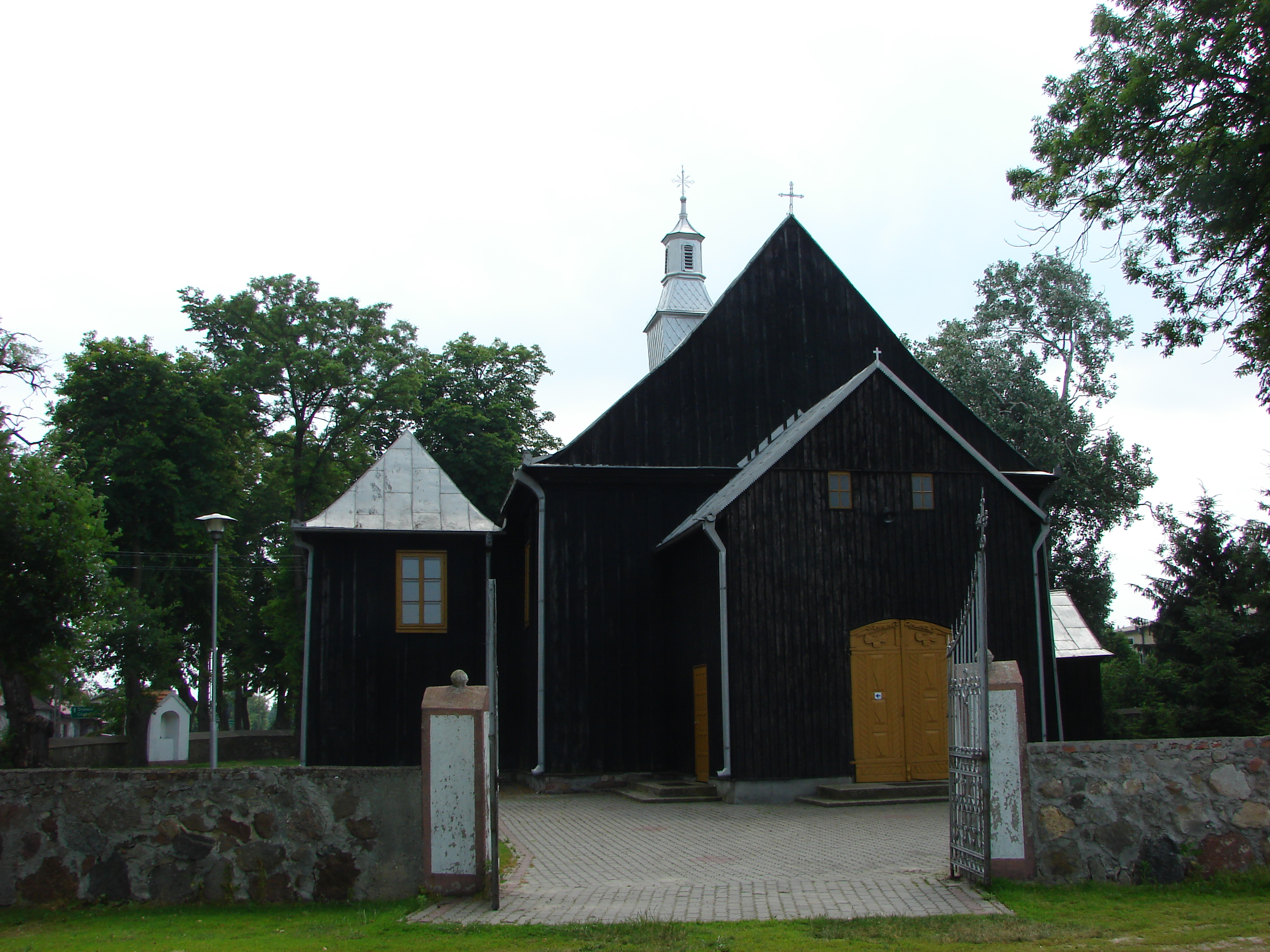
- Wooden parish church of St. Michael, built in the 18th century.

- Location within Poland
- Coordinates: 52°10′N 18°50′E
- Country: Poland
- Voivodeship: Greater Poland
- County: Koło
- Gmina: Olszówka
- Population: 260
- Time zone: UTC+1 (CET)
  - Summer (DST): UTC+2 (CEST)
- Vehicle registration: PKL

Umień [ˈumjɛɲ] is a village in the administrative district of Gmina Olszówka, within Koło County, Greater Poland Voivodeship, in central Poland.
