= Młynik, Koło County =

Młynik
- Village
- Location within Poland
- Coordinates: 52°08′36″N 18°50′56″E
- Country: Poland
- Voivodeship: Greater Poland
- County: Koło
- Gmina: Olszówka
- Time zone: UTC+1 (CET)
  - Summer (DST): UTC+2 (CEST)
- Vehicle registration: PKL

Młynik [ˈmwɨnik] is a village in the administrative district of Gmina Olszówka, within Koło County, Greater Poland Voivodeship, in central Poland.
