= Bytnica =

- Village
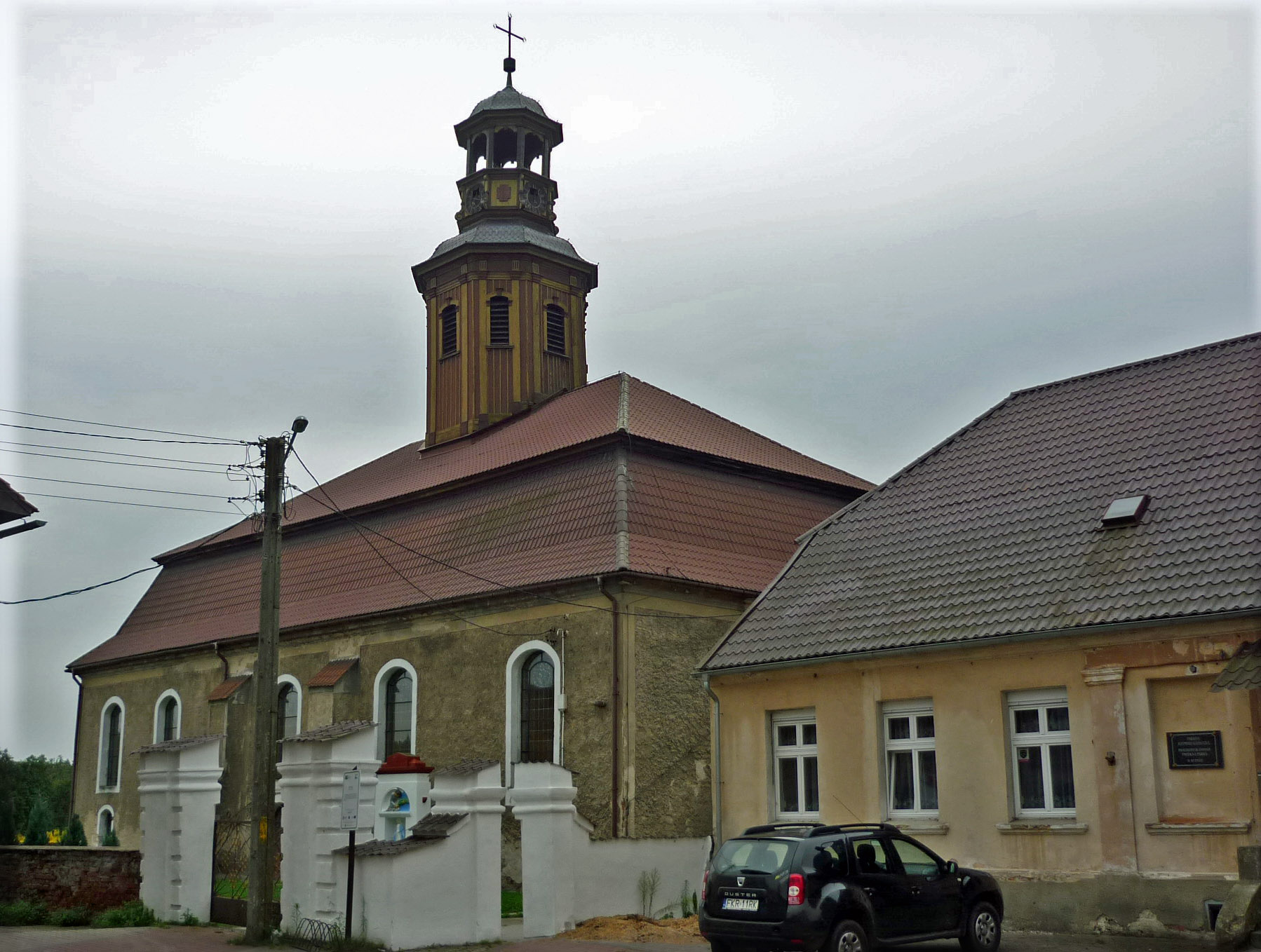

- Location within Poland
- Coordinates: 52°9′1″N 15°10′9″E
- Country: Poland
- Voivodeship: Lubusz
- County: Krosno
- Gmina: Bytnica
- Highest elevation: 70 m (230 ft)
- Lowest elevation: 65 m (213 ft)
- Population: 1,200

Bytnica ([bɨtˈnit͡sa]; German: Beutnitz (Mark)) is a village in Krosno County, Lubusz Voivodeship, in western Poland. It is the seat of the gmina (administrative district) called Gmina Bytnica.
