= Brzózka, Lubusz Voivodeship =

Brzózka
- Village
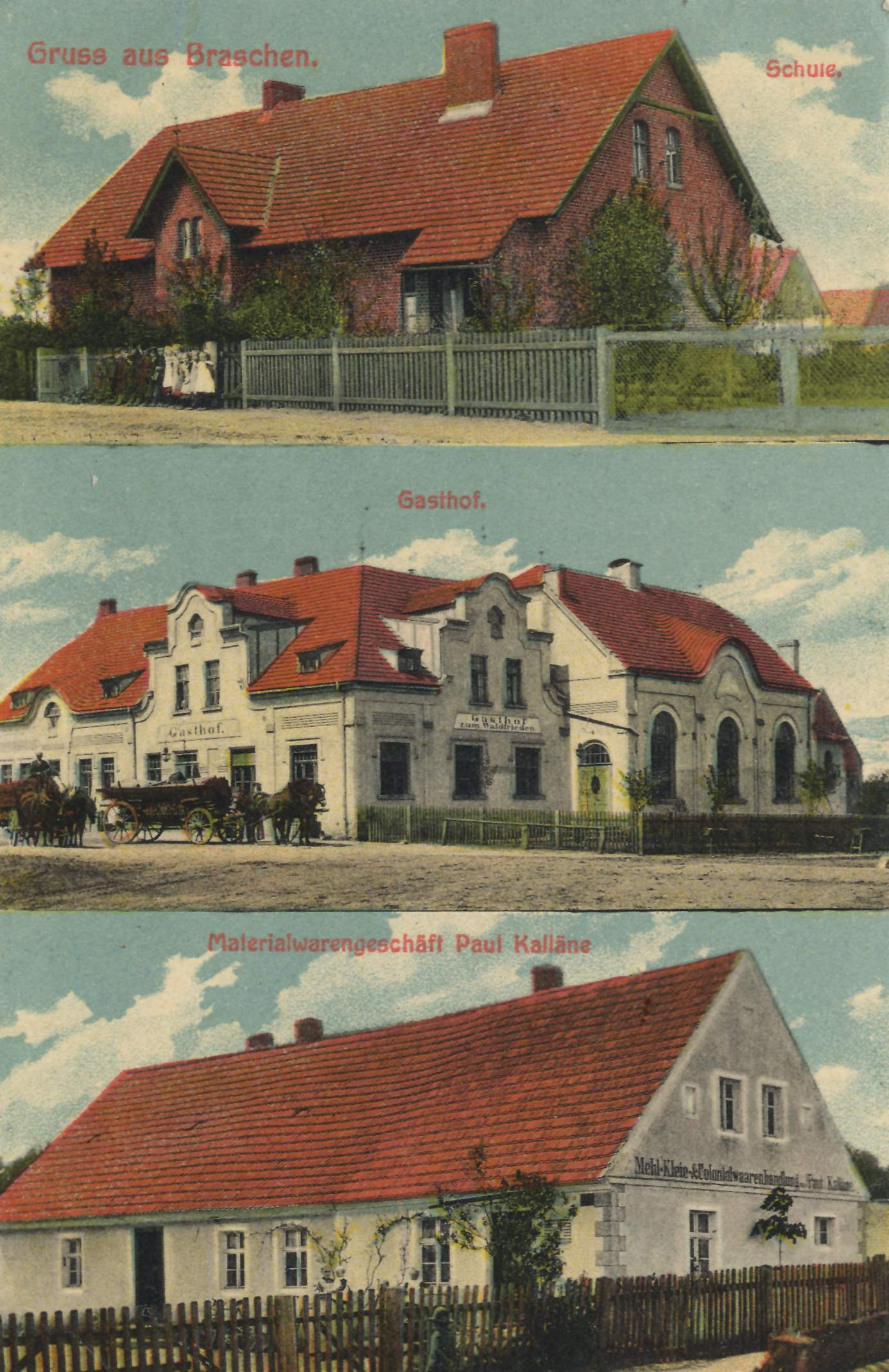

- Location within Poland
- Coordinates: 51°59′N 15°1′E
- Country: Poland
- Voivodeship: Lubusz
- County: Krosno
- Gmina: Krosno Odrzańskie
- Website: http://www.ebrzozka.republika.pl

Brzózka ([ˈbʐuska]; German: Braschen) is a village in the administrative district of Gmina Krosno Odrzańskie, within Krosno County, Lubusz Voivodeship, in western Poland.
