= Zawadka, Gmina Olszówka =

Zawadka
- Village
- Location within Poland
- Coordinates: 52°12′48″N 18°51′55″E
- Country: Poland
- Voivodeship: Greater Poland
- County: Koło
- Gmina: Olszówka
- Time zone: UTC+1 (CET)
  - Summer (DST): UTC+2 (CEST)
- Vehicle registration: PKL

Zawadka [zaˈvatka] is a village in the administrative district of Gmina Olszówka, within Koło County, Greater Poland Voivodeship, in central Poland.

== History ==
Five Polish citizens were murdered by Nazi Germany in the village during World War II.
