= Stary Raduszec =

- Village
- Location within Poland
- Coordinates: 52°3′N 15°6′E
- Country: Poland
- Voivodeship: Lubusz
- County: Krosno
- Gmina: Krosno Odrzańskie

Stary Raduszec ([ˈstarɨ raˈduʂɛt͡s]; German: Alt Rehfeld) is a village in the administrative district of Gmina Krosno Odrzańskie, within Krosno County, Lubusz Voivodeship, in western Poland.
