= Chojna, Lubusz Voivodeship =

Chojna
- Village
- Location within Poland
- Coordinates: 52°1′N 14°54′E
- Country: Poland
- Voivodeship: Lubusz
- County: Krosno
- Gmina: Krosno Odrzańskie

Chojna ([ˈxɔi̯na]; German: Friedrichswalde) is a village in the administrative district of Gmina Krosno Odrzańskie, within Krosno County, Lubusz Voivodeship, in western Poland.
