= Retno =

- Village
- Location within Poland
- Coordinates: 52°03′06″N 15°01′31″E
- Country: Poland
- Voivodeship: Lubusz
- County: Krosno
- Gmina: Krosno Odrzańskie

Retno ([ˈrɛtnɔ]; German: Sorge) is a village in the administrative district of Gmina Krosno Odrzańskie, within Krosno County, Lubusz Voivodeship, in western Poland.
