= Czetowice =

- Village
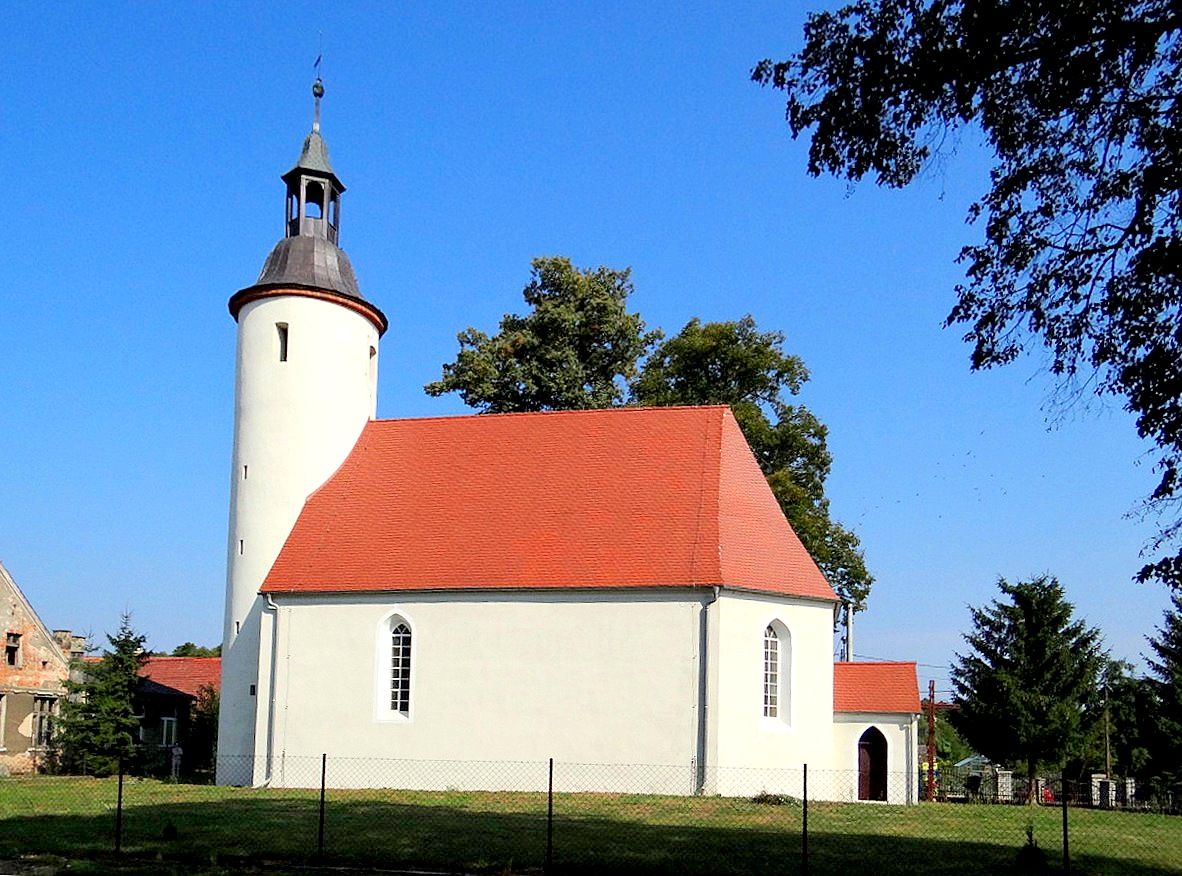
- Our Lady of Sorrows church

- Location within Poland
- Coordinates: 52°6′N 15°4′E
- Country: Poland
- Voivodeship: Lubusz
- County: Krosno
- Gmina: Krosno Odrzańskie
- Time zone: UTC+1 (CET)
  - Summer (DST): UTC+2 (CEST)
- Postal code: 66-600
- Vehicle registration: FKR

Czetowice ([t͡ʂɛtɔˈvit͡sɛ]; German: Zettitz) is a village in the administrative district of Gmina Krosno Odrzańskie, within Krosno County, Lubusz Voivodeship, Lubusz Voivodeship, in western Poland.

The local landmark is the Our Lady of Sorrows church, initially built in Gothic style, later rebuilt in Renaissance style, with 16th-century furnishings.
