= Łochowice, Lubusz Voivodeship =

Łochowice
- Village
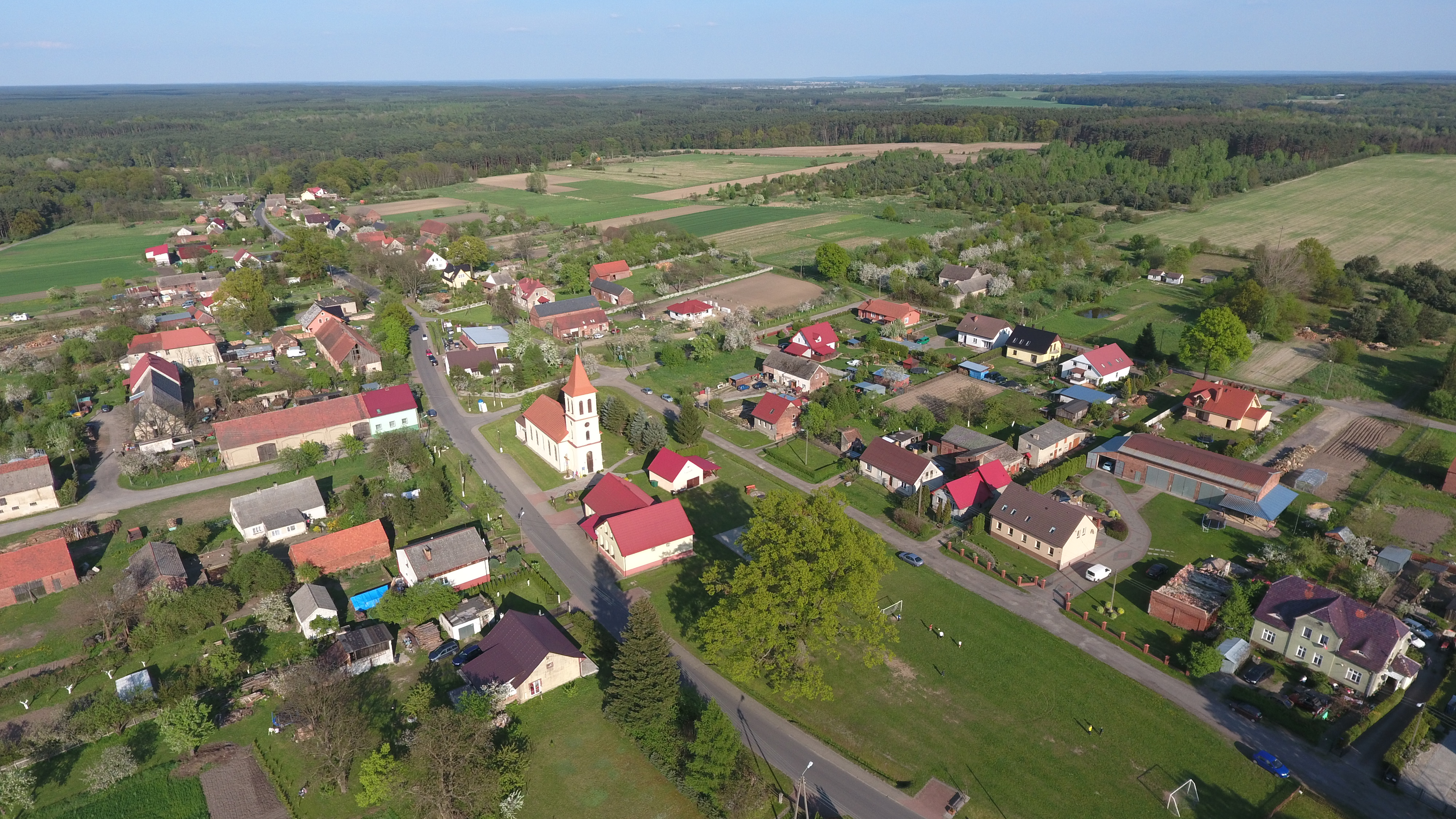

- Location within Poland
- Coordinates: 52°6′N 15°7′E
- Country: Poland
- Voivodeship: Lubusz
- County: Krosno
- Gmina: Krosno Odrzańskie

Łochowice ([wɔxɔˈvit͡sɛ]; German: Lochwitz) is a village in the administrative district of Gmina Krosno Odrzańskie, within Krosno County, Lubusz Voivodeship, in western Poland.
