= Dobrosułów =

- Village
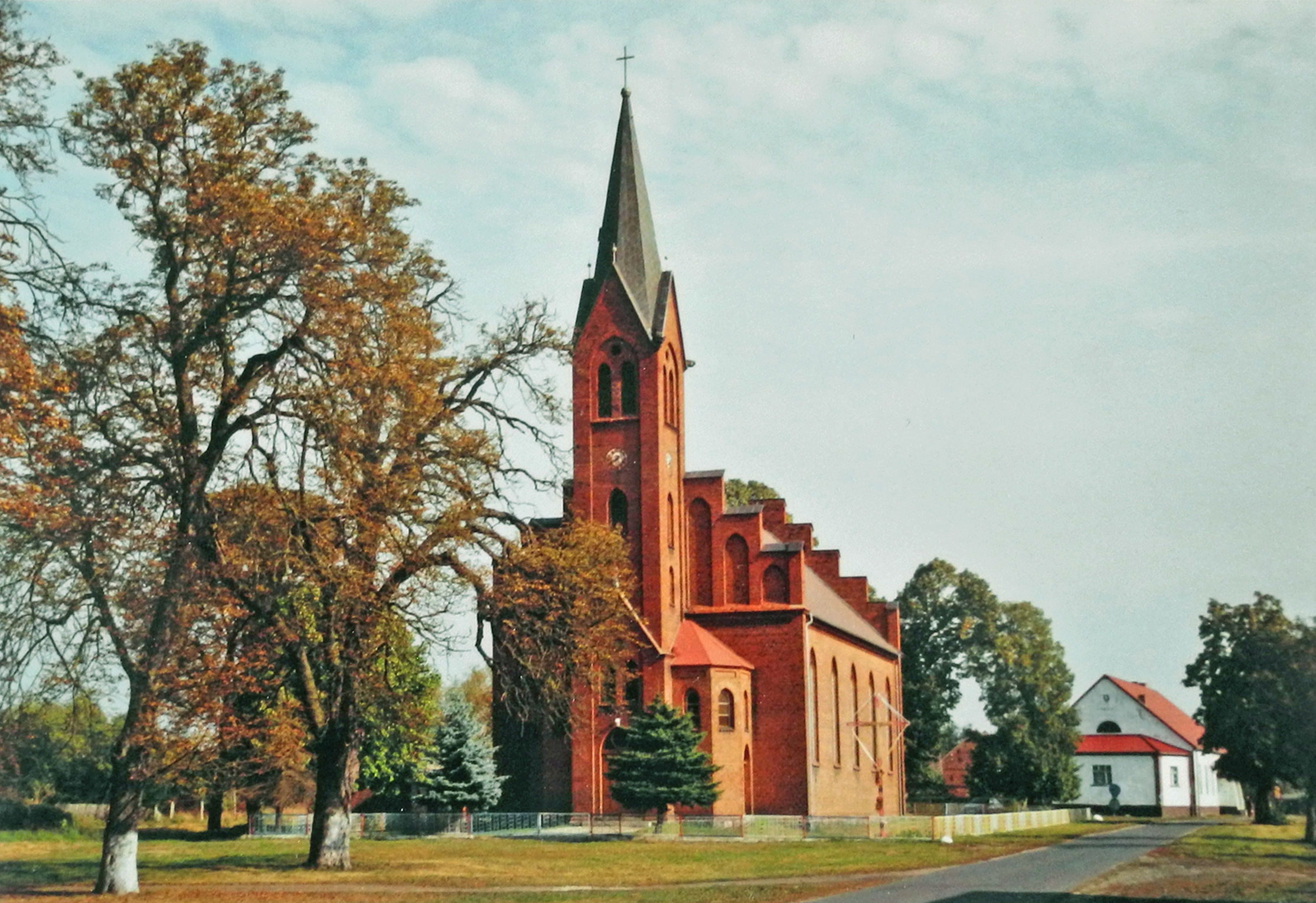
- Catholic church

- Location within Poland
- Coordinates: 52°12′N 15°7′E
- Country: Poland
- Voivodeship: Lubusz
- County: Krosno
- Gmina: Bytnica
- Population: 500

Dobrosułów ([dɔbrɔˈsuwuf]; German: Dobersal, 1938–45 Schönrode) is a village in the administrative district of Gmina Bytnica, within Krosno County, Lubusz Voivodeship, in western Poland.
