= Szczepanów, Greater Poland Voivodeship =

Szczepanów
- Village
- Location within Poland
- Coordinates: 52°09′46″N 18°47′36″E
- Country: Poland
- Voivodeship: Greater Poland
- County: Koło
- Gmina: Olszówka
- Time zone: UTC+1 (CET)
  - Summer (DST): UTC+2 (CEST)
- Vehicle registration: PKL

Szczepanów [ʂt͡ʂɛˈpanuf] is a village in the administrative district of Gmina Olszówka, within Koło County, Greater Poland Voivodeship, in central Poland.
