= Kamień, Lubusz Voivodeship =

Kamień
- Village
- Location within Poland
- Coordinates: 52°03′48″N 15°07′33″E
- Country: Poland
- Voivodeship: Lubusz
- County: Krosno
- Gmina: Krosno Odrzańskie

Kamień (Polish pronunciation: [ˈkamjɛj̃]; German: Kähmen) is a village in the administrative district of Gmina Krosno Odrzańskie, within Krosno County, Lubusz Voivodeship, in western Poland.
