= Drzewica (disambiguation) =

Drzewica is a town in Łódź Voivodeship (central Poland).

Drzewica may also refer to:

- Drzewica, Lubusz Voivodeship (west Poland)
- Drzewica, West Pomeranian Voivodeship (north-west Poland)
