= Budachów =

- Village
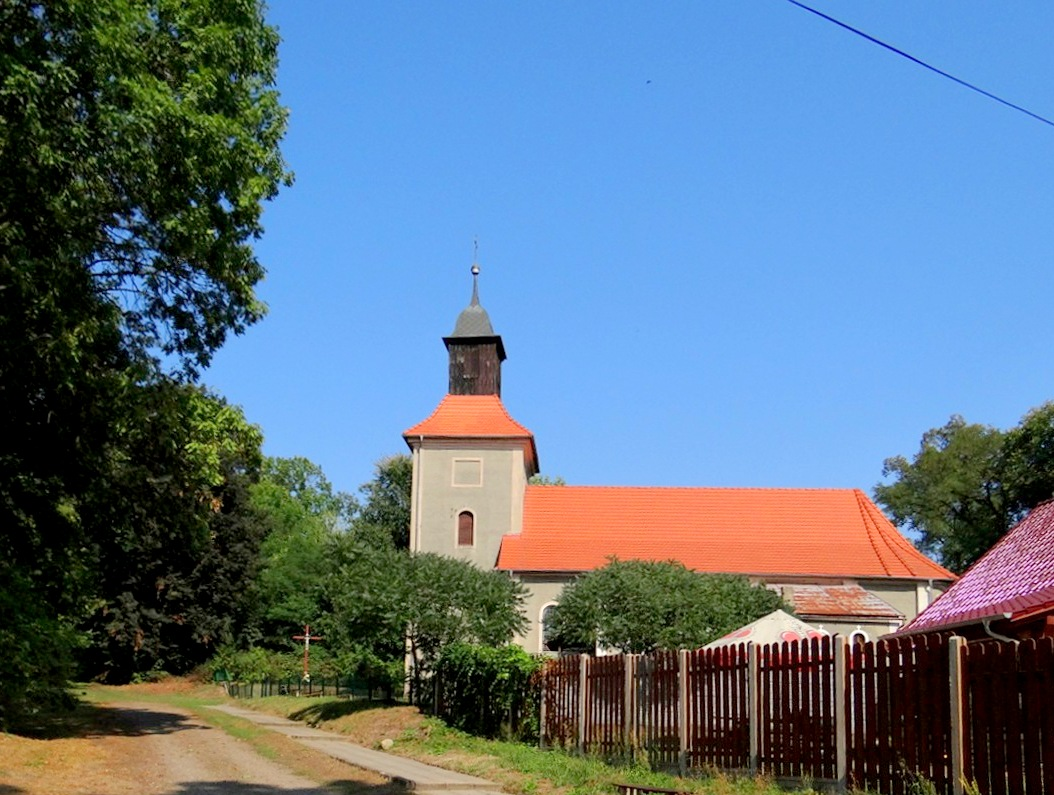
- Catholic church

- Location within Poland
- Coordinates: 52°9′N 15°5′E
- Country: Poland
- Voivodeship: Lubusz
- County: Krosno
- Gmina: Bytnica
- Population: 700

Budachów ([buˈdaxuf]; German: Baudach) is a village in the administrative district of Gmina Bytnica, within Krosno County, Lubusz Voivodeship, in western Poland.
