= Chyże, Lubusz Voivodeship =

Chyże
- Village
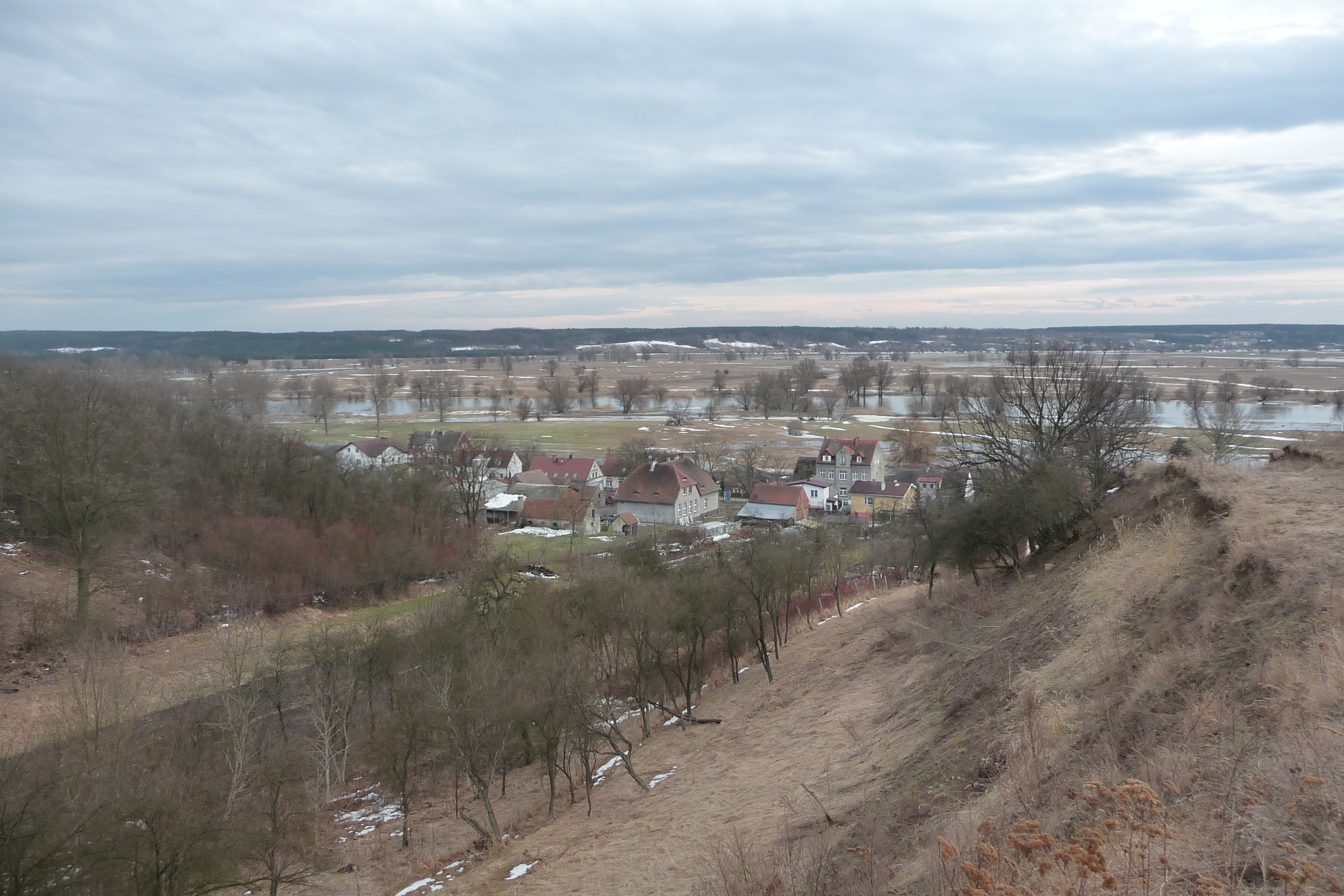

- Location within Poland
- Coordinates: 52°3′N 15°8′E
- Country: Poland
- Voivodeship: Lubusz
- County: Krosno
- Gmina: Krosno Odrzańskie
- Population (approx.): 170

Chyże ([ˈxɨʐɛ]; German: Hundsbelle) is a village in the administrative district of Gmina Krosno Odrzańskie, within Krosno County, Lubusz Voivodeship, in western Poland.
