= Bielów =

- Village
- Location within Poland
- Coordinates: 52°5′24″N 15°4′4″E
- Country: Poland
- Voivodeship: Lubusz
- County: Krosno
- Gmina: Krosno Odrzańskie

Bielów ([ˈbjɛluf]; German: Bielow) is a village in the administrative district of Gmina Krosno Odrzańskie, within Krosno County, Lubusz Voivodeship, in western Poland.
