= Radnica =

- Village
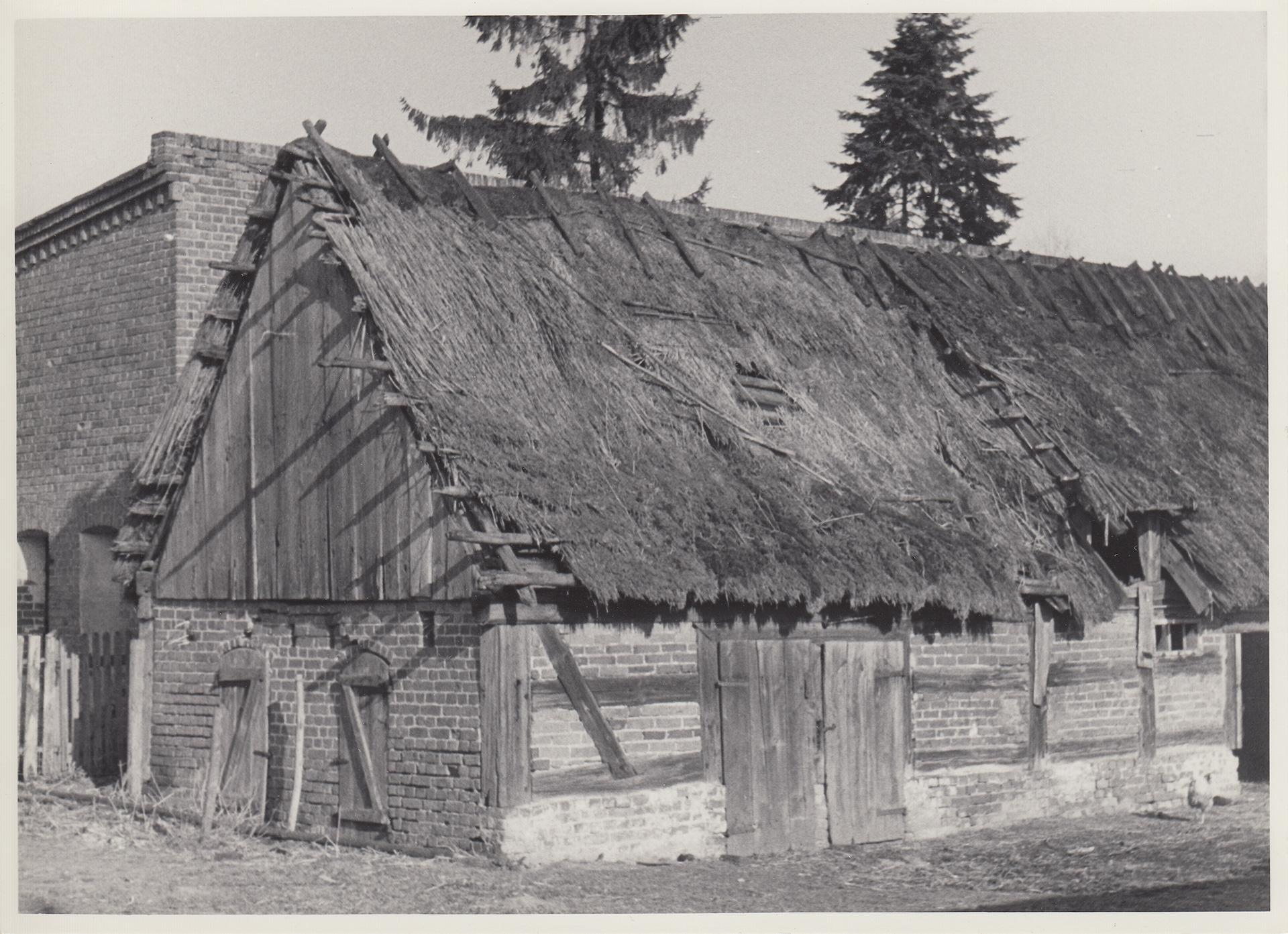

- Location within Poland
- Coordinates: 52°5′N 15°14′E
- Country: Poland
- Voivodeship: Lubusz
- County: Krosno
- Gmina: Krosno Odrzańskie

Radnica ([radˈnit͡sa]; German: Rädnitz) is a village in the administrative district of Gmina Krosno Odrzańskie, within Krosno County, Lubusz Voivodeship, in western Poland.

== Notable residents ==
- Krushka brothers (Christopher, Charles, Frederick, and William), pioneers and miners originally from Rädnitz who emigrated to Tasmania in 1855. They discovered the "Brothers' Home" mine (later part of the world-renowned Briseis Mine) and founded the settlement of Krushka Town (now Ringarooma).
