= Bartlett Adamson =

Australian journalist and poet (1884-1951)

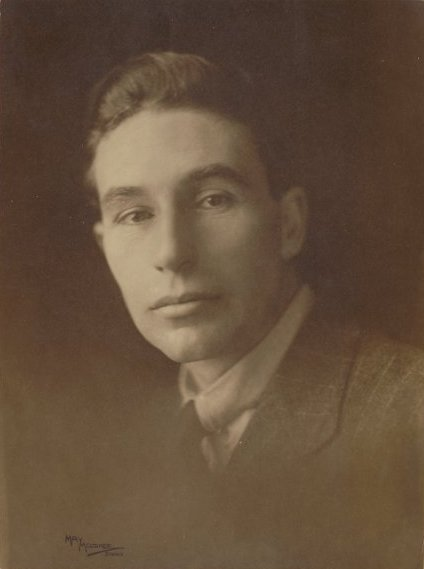
- Adamson in 1919
- Born: 22 December 1884; Cascade, Ringarooma, Colony of Tasmania
- Died: 4 November 1951 (aged 66)
- Resting place: Sydney, New South Wales, Australia
- Occupations: Journalist, poet, writer
- Spouse: Mary Ann McLachlan
- Children: 3 sons
- Writing career
- Language: English
- Years active: 1918-1951

George Ernest “Bartlett” Adamson (22 December 1884 – 4 November 1951) was an Australian journalist, poet, author and political activist.

== Life and work ==
Adamson was born at Cascade, Ringarooma, Tasmania, Australia, on 22 December 1884 to a Scottish-born miner, George Adamson, and his English wife, Jane, née Bartlett. He was educated at Zeehan and Dundas and then worked as a clerk at a mine. The family moved to New Zealand where he worked as a clerk with publishers Whitcomb and Tombs in Wellington. He was rejected for military service during World War I on medical grounds.

He married Scottish-born Mary Anne McLachlan in November 1917 and they went on to have four sons. Always interested in literature, he published a volume of verse, Twelve Sonnets in 1918. This was well received and prompted his departure for Australia. In Sydney he took a position as a journalist with Smith's Weekly, writing feature articles, verse and light fiction. He left the paper in 1923 and began work as a freelance writer, especially for the Sunday Times. He worked on the side as an orchardist and helped to establish a cooperative for local orchardists.

He established the periodical Sydneysider, but it closed down during the Great Depression. This forced a return, in 1935, to Smith's Weekly, where he remained till its closure, in 1950.

He was active on the executive of the Fellowship of Australian Writers, and served a term as its president. In that capacity he was successful in persuading the federal government to increase funding for the Commonwealth Literary Fund in 1938. He also lobbied for more liberal changes to the Obscene and Indecent Publications (Amendment) Act of 1946. His left wing sympathies and the rise of fascism in Europe during World War II saw him join the Australian Communist Party in 1943.

The subjects of his books varied widely and ranged from children's books to collections of leftist political verse. He was a campaigner for civil liberties and often used his writing to try and improve the condition of ordinary people.

He died suddenly, on 4 November 1951, while addressing a crowd in the Domain, Sydney.

== Publications ==
The following is a selected list of publications.

=== Non-fiction ===
- Frank Clune; Author and Ethnological Anachronism. (1944)

=== Fiction ===
- Mystery Gold. (1925)
- Nice day for a murder and other stories. (1944)

=== Poetry ===
- Twelve Sonnets (1918)
- These beautiful women (1932)
- Beyond the sun (1942)
- Bringer of Light: An allegorical fantasy (1945)
- Comrades all and other poems for the people (1945)

== Sources ==
- Robert Darby, Adamson, George Ernest “Bartlett” (1884-1951)", Australian Dictionary of Biography Vol 13, (1993) accessed online 18 August 2018.
- Len Fox, Bartlett Adamson (1963), Sydney, Fellowship of Australian Writers.
