= Gryżyński Potok =

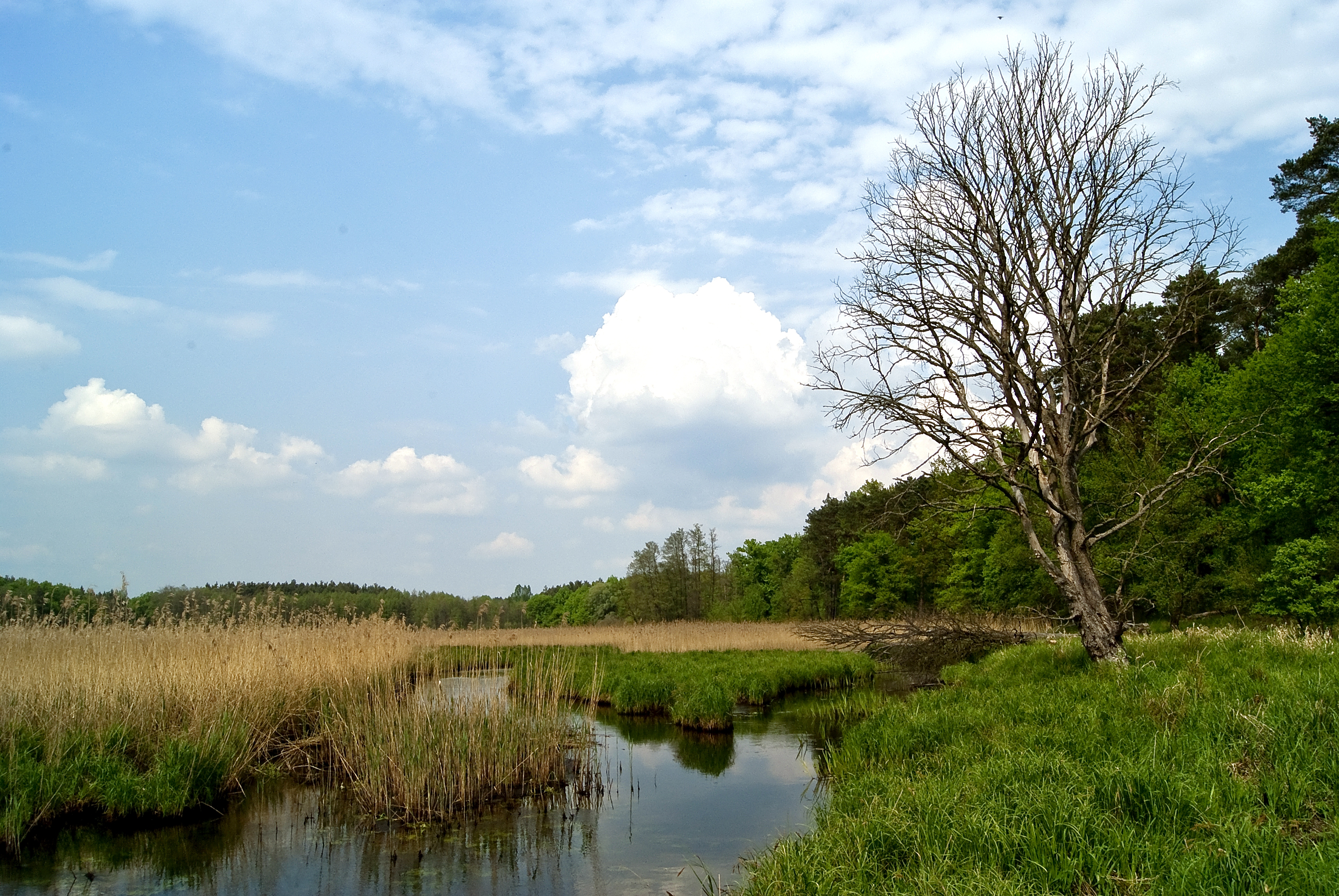

Location
- Country: Poland

Physical characteristics
- Mouth
  - location: Oder
  - coordinates: 52.0731°N 15.2536°E

Basin features
- Progression: Oder→ Baltic Sea

Gryżyński Potok (also Gryżynka) is a river of Poland, a right tributary of the Oder near Radnica.
