= Nowy Raduszec =

- Village
- Location within Poland
- Coordinates: 52°2′N 15°3′E
- Country: Poland
- Voivodeship: Lubusz
- County: Krosno
- Gmina: Krosno Odrzańskie

Nowy Raduszec ([ˈnɔvɨ raˈduʂɛt͡s]; German: Neu Rehfeld) is a village in the administrative district of Gmina Krosno Odrzańskie, within Krosno County, Lubusz Voivodeship, in western Poland.
