= Czarnowo, Lubusz Voivodeship =

Czarnowo
- Village
- Location within Poland
- Coordinates: 52°2′N 14°58′E
- Country: Poland
- Voivodeship: Lubusz
- County: Krosno
- Gmina: Krosno Odrzańskie

Czarnowo ([t͡ʂarˈnɔvɔ]; German: Neuendorf) is a village in the administrative district of Gmina Krosno Odrzańskie, within Krosno County, Lubusz Voivodeship, in western Poland.
