= Morsko, Lubusz Voivodeship =

Morsko
- Village
- Location within Poland
- Coordinates: 52°4′25″N 15°8′40″E
- Country: Poland
- Voivodeship: Lubusz
- County: Krosno
- Gmina: Krosno Odrzańskie
- Population: 30

Morsko ([ˈmɔrskɔ]; German: Murzig) is a village in the administrative district of Gmina Krosno Odrzańskie, within Krosno County, Lubusz Voivodeship, in western Poland.
