= Drzewica, Lubusz Voivodeship =

Drzewica
- Village
- Location within Poland
- Coordinates: 52°9′35″N 15°6′57″E
- Country: Poland
- Voivodeship: Lubusz
- County: Krosno
- Gmina: Bytnica

Drzewica ([dʐɛˈvit͡sa]; German: Drewitz) is a village in the administrative district of Gmina Bytnica, within Krosno County, Lubusz Voivodeship, in western Poland.
