= Struga, Lubusz Voivodeship =

Struga
- Village
- Location within Poland
- Coordinates: 52°6′37″N 15°7′14″E
- Country: Poland
- Voivodeship: Lubusz
- County: Krosno
- Gmina: Bytnica
- Population: 108

Struga ([ˈstruɡa]; German: Straube) is a village in the administrative district of Gmina Bytnica, within Krosno County, Lubusz Voivodeship, in western Poland.
