= Gryżyna, Lubusz Voivodeship =

Gryżyna
- Village
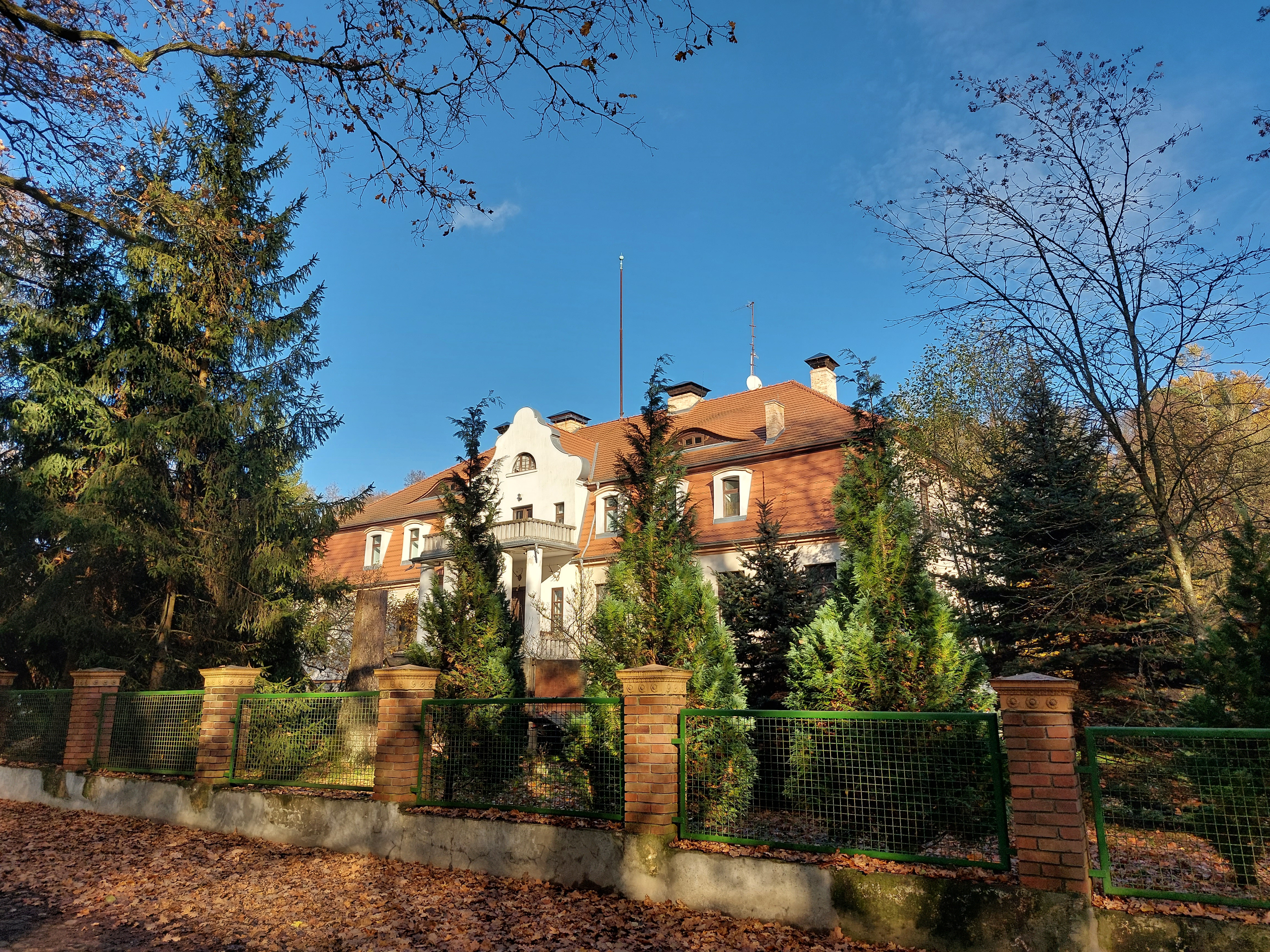
- Palace

- Location within Poland
- Coordinates: 52°11′0″N 15°17′0″E
- Country: Poland
- Voivodeship: Lubusz
- County: Krosno
- Gmina: Bytnica
- Elevation: 75 m (246 ft)
- Population: 140

Gryżyna ([ɡrɨˈʐɨna]; German: Griesel) is a village in the administrative district of Gmina Bytnica, within Krosno County, Lubusz Voivodeship, in western Poland.

The village gives its name to the protected area called Gryżyna Landscape Park.
