= Struga, Bytów County =

Struga
- Settlement
- Location within Poland
- Coordinates: 54°15′11″N 17°35′5″E
- Country: Poland
- Voivodeship: Pomeranian
- County: Bytów
- Gmina: Parchowo

Struga ([ˈstruɡa]; Kashubian: Strùga) is a settlement in the administrative district of Gmina Parchowo, within Bytów County, Pomeranian Voivodeship, in northern Poland.

For details of the history of the region, see History of Pomerania.
