= Szklarka Radnicka =

- Village
- Location within Poland
- Coordinates: 52°6′N 15°17′E
- Country: Poland
- Voivodeship: Lubusz
- County: Krosno
- Gmina: Krosno Odrzańskie
- Website: http://gryzynski-park.ovh.org

Szklarka Radnicka (Polish pronunciation: [ˈʂklarka radˈnit͡ska]; German: Rädnitzer Hüttenwerke) is a village in the administrative district of Gmina Krosno Odrzańskie, within Krosno County, Lubusz Voivodeship, in western Poland.
