= Głębokie, Gmina Bytnica =

Głębokie
- Village
- Location within Poland
- Coordinates: 52°7′43″N 15°11′9″E
- Country: Poland
- Voivodeship: Lubusz
- County: Krosno
- Gmina: Bytnica
- Population: 40

Głębokie ([ɡwɛmˈbɔkʲɛ]; German: Glembach) is a village in the administrative district of Gmina Bytnica, within Krosno County, Lubusz Voivodeship, in western Poland.
