= Osiecznica, Lubusz Voivodeship =

Osiecznica
- Village
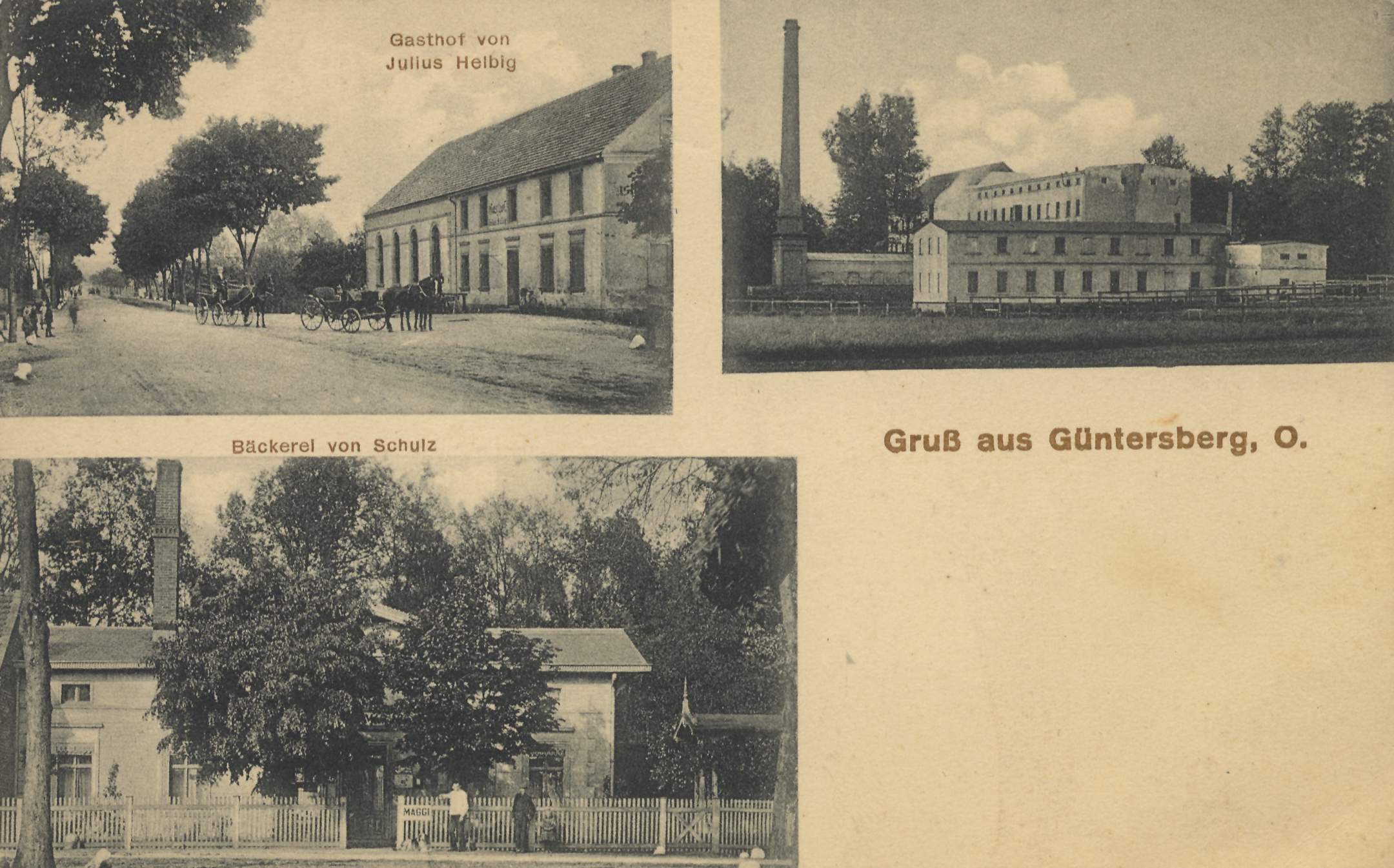

- Location within Poland
- Coordinates: 52°4′N 15°2′E
- Country: Poland
- Voivodeship: Lubusz
- County: Krosno
- Gmina: Krosno Odrzańskie
- Population: 1,000
- Website: http://osiecznica_2008.republika.pl

Osiecznica ([ɔɕɛt͡ʂˈnit͡sa]; German: Güntersberg) is a village in the administrative district of Gmina Krosno Odrzańskie, within Krosno County, Lubusz Voivodeship, in western Poland.
