= Kępiny, Lubusz Voivodeship =

Kępiny
- Settlement
- Location within Poland
- Coordinates: 52°11′10″N 15°4′28″E
- Country: Poland
- Voivodeship: Lubusz
- County: Krosno
- Gmina: Bytnica
- Population: 20

Kępiny ([kɛmˈpinɨ]; German: Kuttel) is a settlement in the administrative district of Gmina Bytnica, within Krosno County, Lubusz Voivodeship, in western Poland.
