= Grabin, Lubusz Voivodeship =

Grabin
- Village
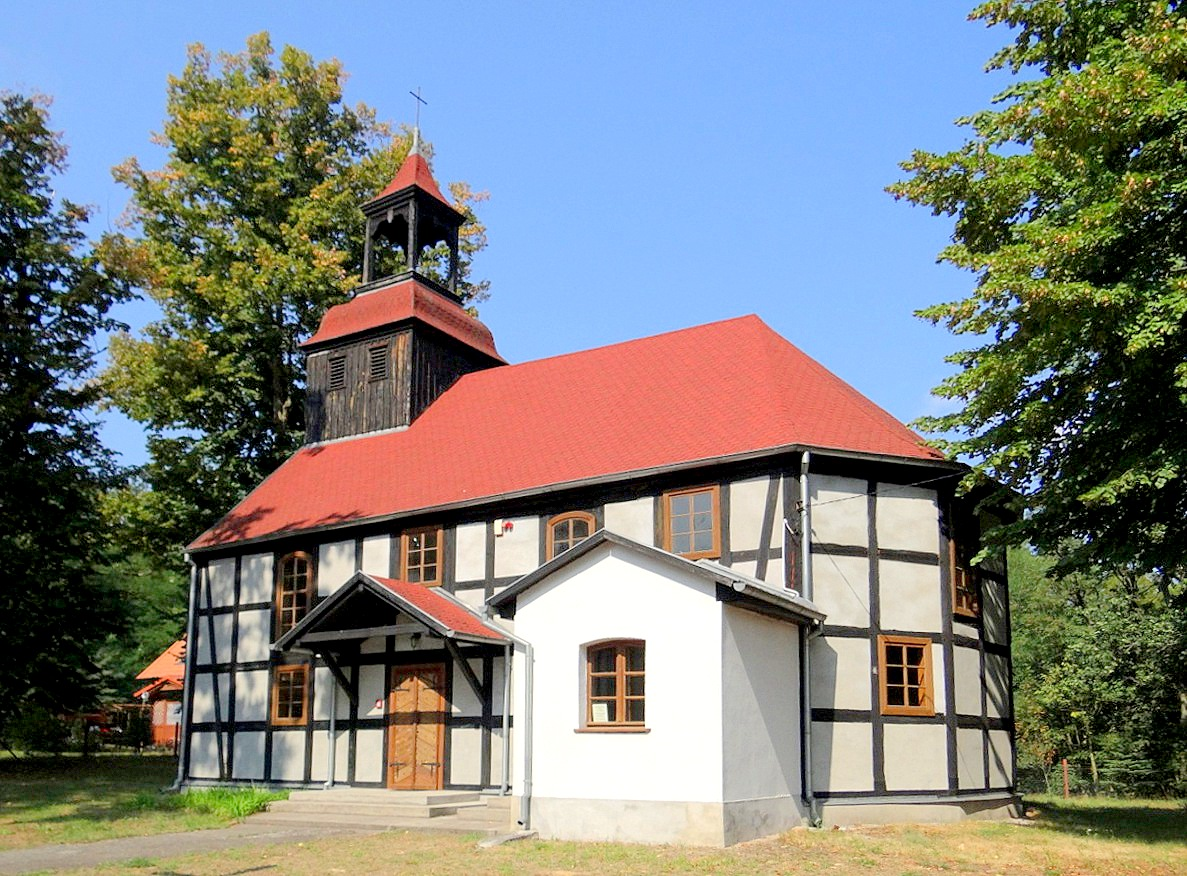
- Catholic church

- Location within Poland
- Coordinates: 52°7′N 15°16′E
- Country: Poland
- Voivodeship: Lubusz
- County: Krosno
- Gmina: Bytnica
- Elevation: 75 m (246 ft)
- Population: 250

Grabin ([ˈɡrabin]; German: Krämersborn) is a village in the administrative district of Gmina Bytnica, within Krosno County, Lubusz Voivodeship, in western Poland.
