= Boobyalla =

- Town
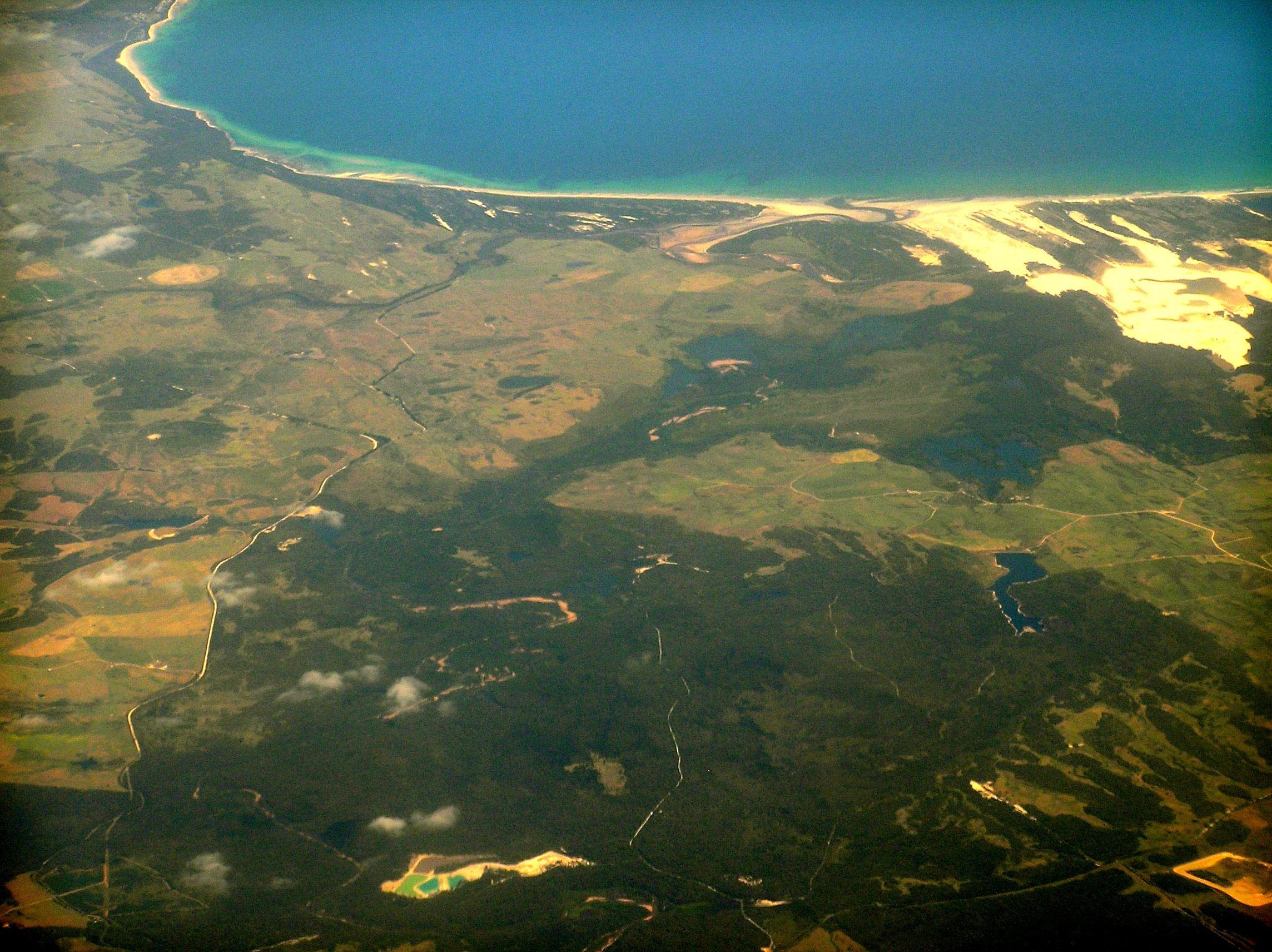
- Boobyalla is in the centre of the coast in this aerial photo

- Coordinates: 40.8819°S 147.8889°E
- Country: Australia
- State: Tasmania
- LGA: Dorset Council

Government
  - State electorate: Bass
  - Federal division: Bass

Population
  - Total: 0 (?)
- Postcode: 7264

Boobyalla was a shipping port on the north-east coast of Tasmania, Australia during the latter half of the nineteenth century. Coastal vessels ran regularly to the port from other Tasmanian ports, carting tin from the mines around nearby Mount Cameron.

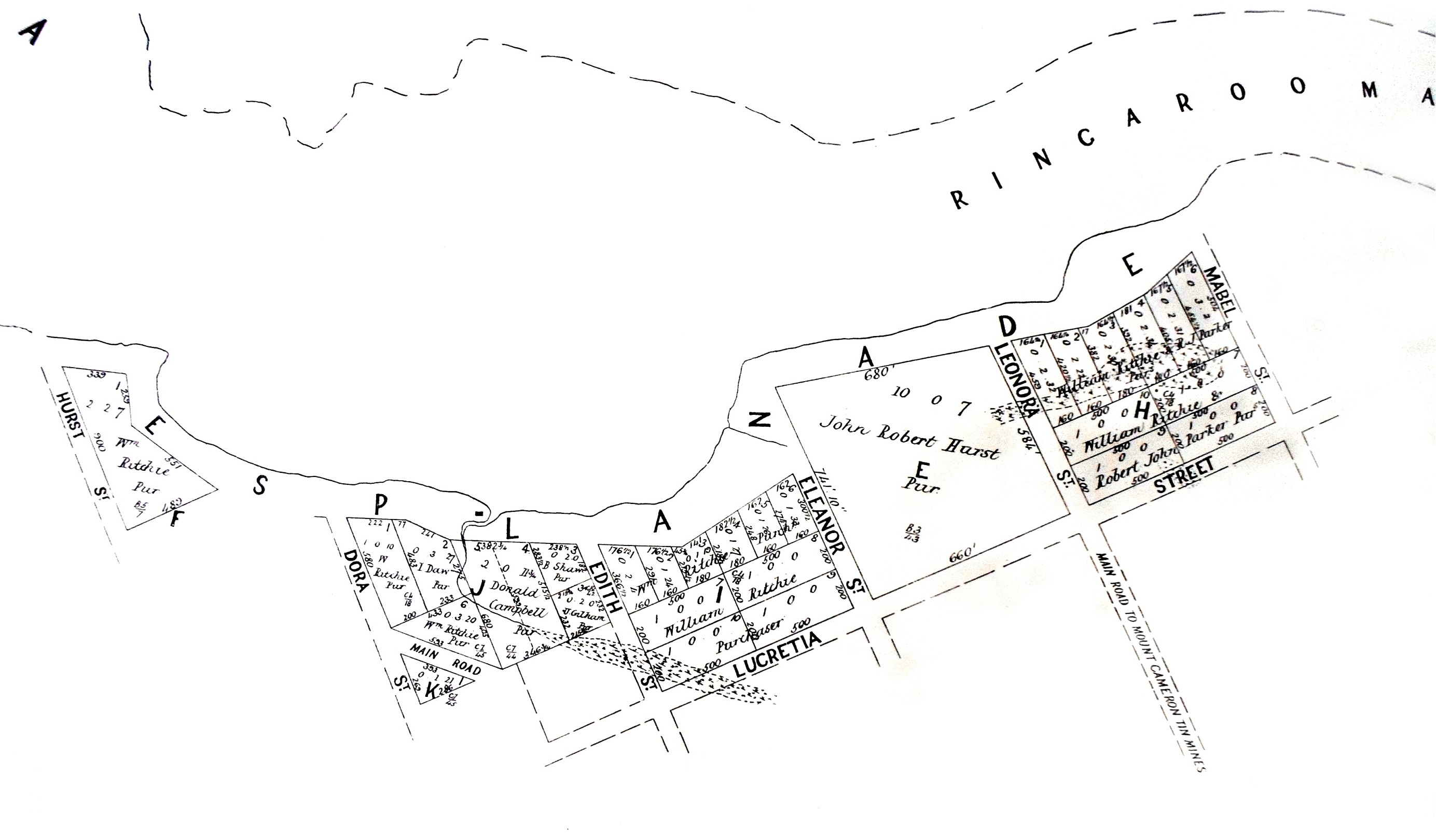
Plan of Boobyalla in the early 1900s

Boobyalla Post Office opened on 29 July 1875 and closed in 1927.

== Fauna ==
The Boobyalla River, on which the port used to sit, is now a possible habitat for the rare fish species dwarf galaxid and Australian grayling, as well as the Green and Gold Frog Litoria raniformis.

== Boobyalla today ==
Little remains of Boobyalla, now a ghost town, as buildings such as the old hotel and houses were either burned down by bushfires or dismantled. Remnants of the old wharf are still visible at the edge of the silted-up Boobyalla River. A single property now owns the whole site with the main house located at the end of former Hurst Street.
