= Dobrescu =

Dobrescu is a Romanian surname, derived from the first name Dobrin. Notable people with the surname include:

- Bogdan A. Dobrescu (born 1968), physicist
- Constantin Dobrescu-Argeș (1856–1903), politician and peasant activist
- Dem I. Dobrescu (1869–1948), mayor of Bucharest (1929–1934) and political activist
- Dimitrie Dobrescu (1852–1934), mayor of Bucharest (1911–1912), conservative politician
- Emilian Dobrescu (born 1933), economist
- Liliana Dobrescu (born 1971), swimmer
- Mihai Bogdan Dobrescu (born 1976), boxer
- Mircea Dobrescu (1930–2015), boxer
- Nicolae Dobrescu (1874–1914), church historian

== See also ==
- Dobre (disambiguation)
- Dobra (disambiguation)
- Dobrin (disambiguation)
- Dobrușa (disambiguation)
- Dobrești (disambiguation)
- Dobrotești (disambiguation)
