= Dobrești =

Dobreşti may refer to:

- Dobrești, Argeș, a commune in Argeș County, Romania
- Dobrești, Bihor, a commune in Bihor County, Romania
- Dobrești, Dolj, a commune in Dolj County, Romania
- Dobrești, a village in Gârda de Sus Commune, Alba County, Romania
- Dobrești, a village in Moroeni Commune, Dâmbovița County, Romania
- Dobrești, a village in Bara Commune, Timiș County, Romania
- Dobrești, a village in Dănicei Commune, Vâlcea County, Romania

== See also ==
- Dobre (disambiguation)
- Dobra (disambiguation)
- Dobrin (disambiguation)
- Dobrușa (disambiguation)
- Dobrotești (disambiguation)
- Dobrescu (surname)
