= Dobrușa =

Dobrușa may refer to several places in Romania:

- Dobrușa, a village in Ștefănești Commune, Vâlcea County
- Dobrușa River

and in Moldova:

- Dobrușa, a commune in Șoldănești District
- Dobrușa, a village in Negureni Commune, Telenești District

== See also ==
- Dobre (disambiguation)
- Dobra (disambiguation)
- Dobrin (disambiguation)
- Dobrești (disambiguation)
- Dobrotești (disambiguation)
- Dobrescu (surname)
