= Dobrotești =

Dobroteşti may refer to several places in Romania:

- Dobroteşti, a commune in Dolj County
- Dobroteşti, a commune in Teleorman County

== See also ==
- Dobre (disambiguation)
- Dobra (disambiguation)
- Dobrin (disambiguation)
- Dobrușa (disambiguation)
- Dobrești (disambiguation)
- Dobrescu (surname)
