= Gubinsky =

Gubinsky (masculine), Gubinskaya (feminine), or Gubinskoye (neuter) is the name of several rural localities in Russia:

- Gubinskaya, Ivanovo Oblast, a village in Ivanovo Oblast
- Gubinskaya, name of several other rural localities
- Gubinskaya, in the 19th century, name of the village of Gubino, now in Orekhovo-Zuyevsky District of Moscow Oblast

== See also ==
- Nyvy-Hubynski, a village in Ukraine
- Stargard Gubiński, a village in Poland
