= Wałowice, Lubusz Voivodeship =

Wałowice
- Village
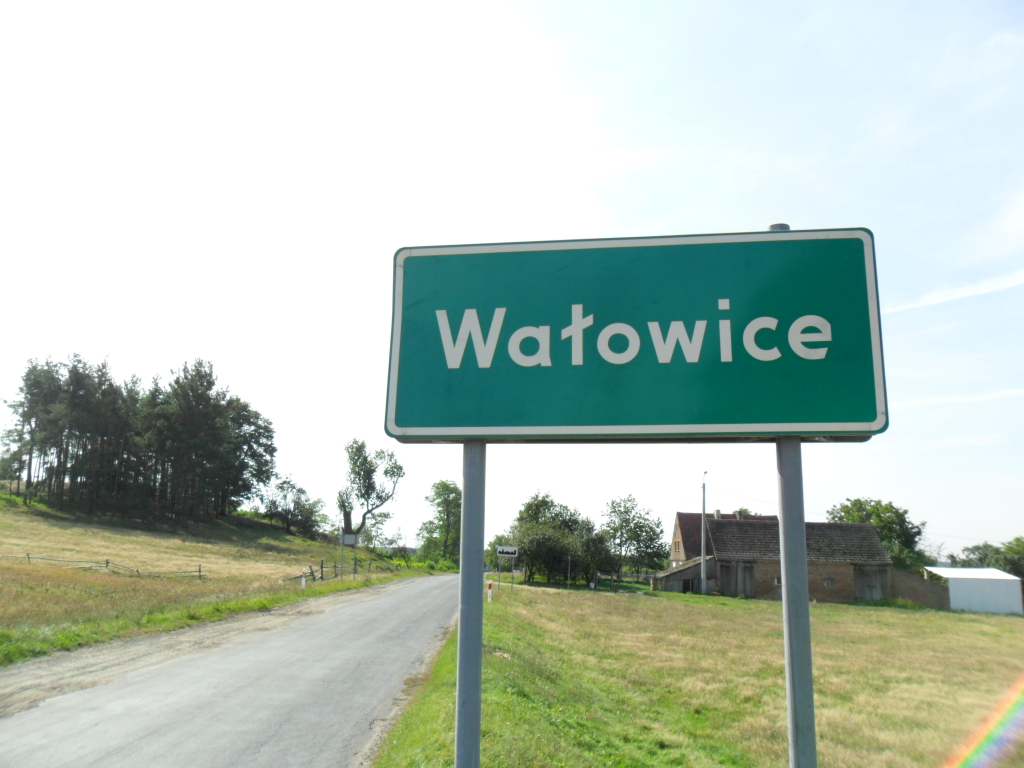

- Location within Poland
- Coordinates: 51°59′N 14°48′E
- Country: Poland
- Voivodeship: Lubusz
- County: Krosno
- Gmina: Gubin

Wałowice ([vawɔˈvit͡sɛ]; German: Wallwitz) is a village in the administrative district of Gmina Gubin, within Krosno County, Lubusz Voivodeship, in western Poland, close to the German border.
