= Sieńsk =

- Village
- Location within Poland
- Coordinates: 51°51′27″N 14°47′24″E
- Country: Poland
- Voivodeship: Lubusz
- County: Krosno
- Gmina: Gubin
- Population: 110

Sieńsk ([ɕɛɲsk]; German: Antoinettenruh) is a village in the administrative district of Gmina Gubin, within Krosno County, Lubusz Voivodeship, in western Poland, close to the German border.
