= Łazy, Gmina Gubin =

Łazy
- Village
- Location within Poland
- Coordinates: 51°41′49″N 14°51′22″E
- Country: Poland
- Voivodeship: Lubusz
- County: Krosno
- Gmina: Gubin
- Population: 70

Łazy ([ˈwazɨ]; German: Laaso) is a village in the administrative district of Gmina Gubin, within Krosno County, Lubusz Voivodeship, in western Poland, close to the German border.
