= Chlebowo, Lubusz Voivodeship =

Chlebowo
- Village
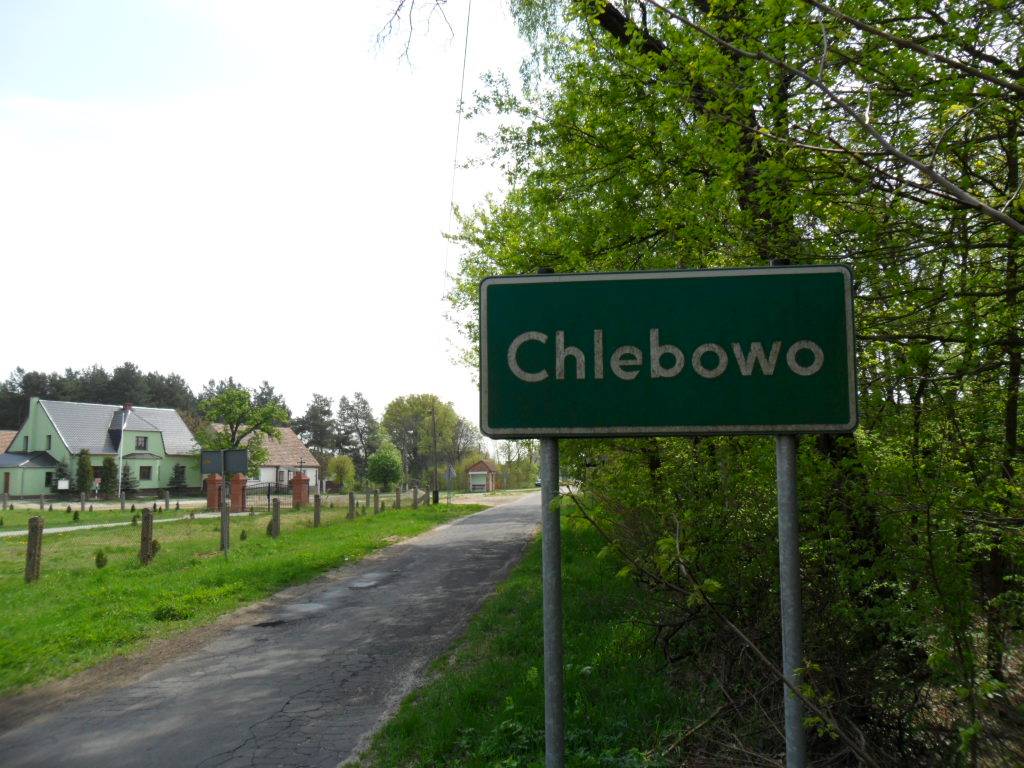

- Location within Poland
- Coordinates: 52°2′12″N 14°52′8″E
- Country: Poland
- Voivodeship: Lubusz
- County: Krosno
- Gmina: Gubin

Chlebowo ([xlɛˈbɔvɔ]; German: Niemaschkleba; 1937–1945 Lindenhain; Lower Sorbian: Njamašklěb) is a village in the administrative district of Gmina Gubin, within Krosno County, Lubusz Voivodeship, in western Poland, close to the German border.

== History ==
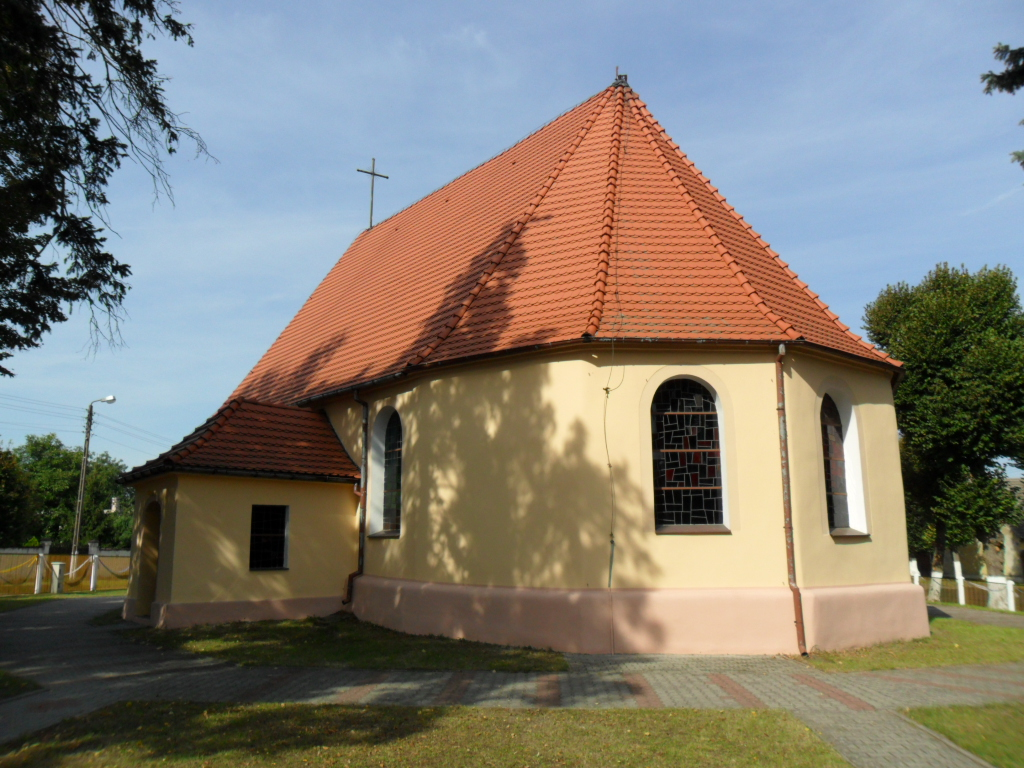
St Joseph Church

The name of the village is possibly derived from Slavic chleb ("bread"). It was first documented as Schwchleb and Nemascleb in the 1295 Liber fundationis episcopatus Vratislaviensis document by the Bishops of Wrocław. The settlement then was located at the eastern border of the German March of Lusatia, close to the Silesian Duchy of Głogów.

The area was part of the Bohemian crown lands before it passed to the Electorate of Saxony according to the 1635 Peace of Prague. Ceded to the Kingdom of Prussia, it was incorporated into the Province of Brandenburg in 1815. Under Nazi German rule, the village's name was Germanised to Lindenhain in 1937; after it fell to the Republic of Poland according to the 1945 Potsdam Agreement (see Territorial changes of Poland after World War II), it was renamed Niemaszchleba and again in 1953 Chlebowo.
