= Sękowice, Lubusz Voivodeship =

Sękowice
- Village
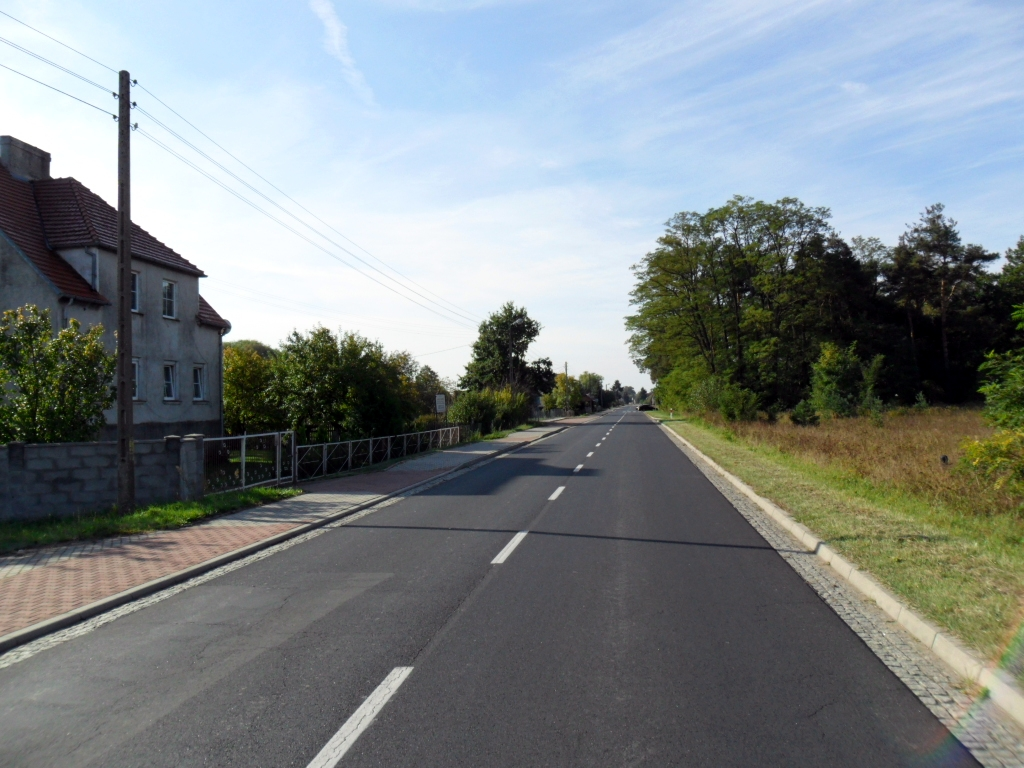

- Location within Poland
- Coordinates: 51°55′N 14°43′E
- Country: Poland
- Voivodeship: Lubusz
- County: Krosno
- Gmina: Gubin

Sękowice ([sɛnkɔˈvit͡sɛ]; German: Schenkendorf; Lower Sorbian: Šenkojce) is a village in the administrative district of Gmina Gubin, within Krosno County, Lubusz Voivodeship, in western Poland, close to the German border.
