= Komorów, Lubusz Voivodeship =

Komorów
- Village
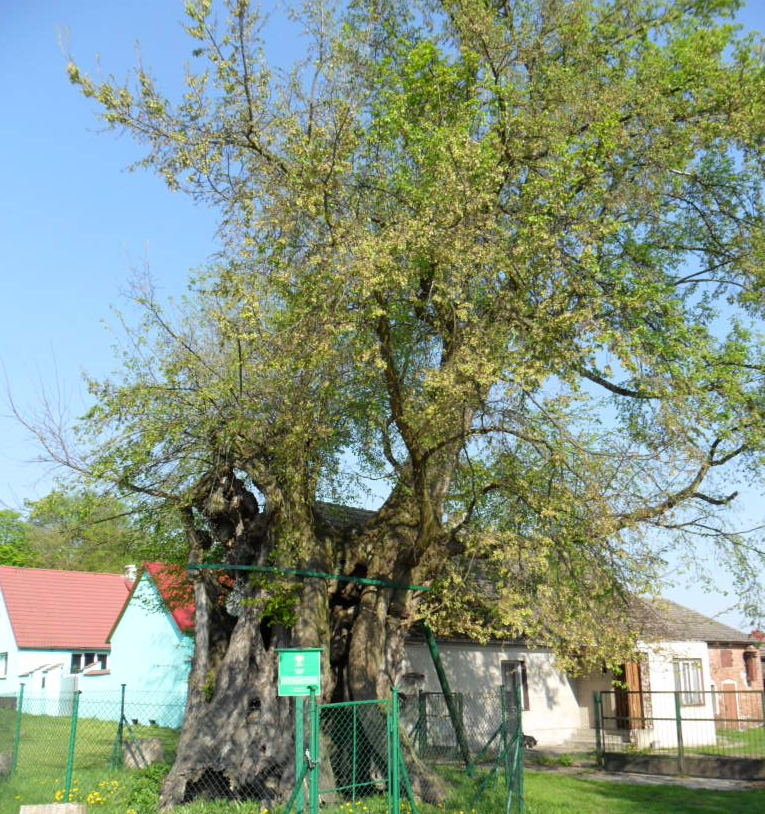

- Location within Poland
- Coordinates: 51°57′N 14°45′E
- Country: Poland
- Voivodeship: Lubusz
- County: Krosno
- Gmina: Gubin

Komorów ([kɔˈmɔruf]; German: Mückenberg) is a village in the administrative district of Gmina Gubin, within Krosno County, Lubusz Voivodeship, in western Poland, close to the German border.
