= Koperno =

- Village
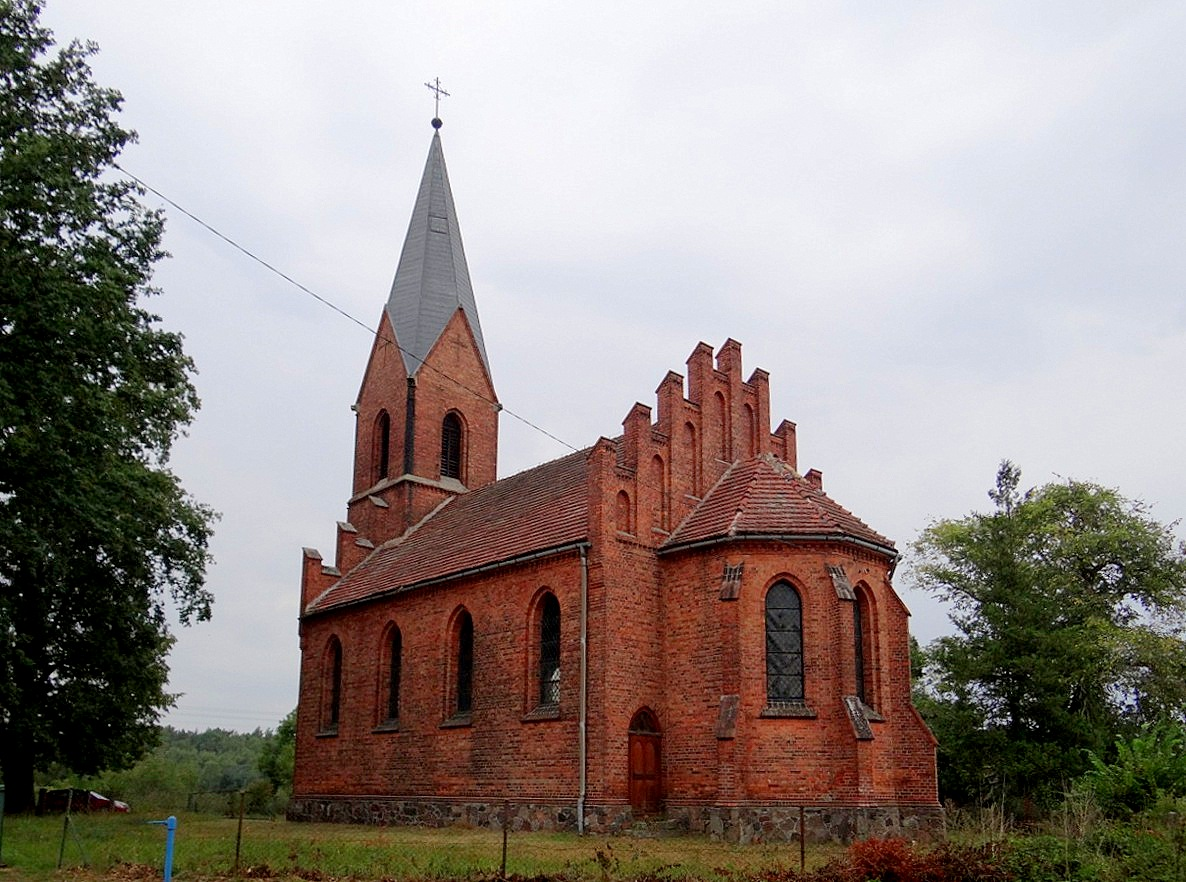
- 19th century Catholic church in Koperno

- Location within Poland
- Coordinates: 51°53′N 14°44′E
- Country: Poland
- Voivodeship: Lubusz
- County: Krosno
- Gmina: Gubin

Koperno ([kɔˈpɛrnɔ]; German: Küppern) is a village in the administrative district of Gmina Gubin, within Krosno County, Lubusz Voivodeship, in western Poland, close to the German border.
