= Łomy =

Łomy may refer to the following places:

- Łomy, Lubusz Voivodeship (west Poland)
- Łomy, Podlaskie Voivodeship (north-east Poland)
- Łomy, Warmian-Masurian Voivodeship (north Poland)
