= Sadzarzewice =

- Village
- Location within Poland
- Coordinates: 51°53′06″N 14°39′56″E
- Country: Poland
- Voivodeship: Lubusz
- County: Krosno
- Gmina: Gubin

Sadzarzewice ([sad͡zaʐɛˈvit͡sɛ]; German: Sadersdorf) is a village in the administrative district of Gmina Gubin, within Krosno County, Lubusz Voivodeship, in western Poland, close to the German border.
