= Chęciny (disambiguation) =

Chęciny may refer to the following places:

- Chęciny, Lubusz Voivodeship (west Poland)
- Chęciny, Masovian Voivodeship (east-central Poland)
- Chęciny in Świętokrzyskie Voivodeship (south-central Poland)
