= Dobrynin (disambiguation) =

Dobrynin is a village in Poland. Dobrynin may also refer to

- Dobrynin (surname)
- Mount Dobrynin in Antarctica
- Dobrynin VD-4K, a Soviet piston engine
- Dobrynin RD-7, a Soviet turbojet engine

== See also ==
- Dobrin (disambiguation)
- Dobrina (disambiguation)
- Dobrynia (disambiguation)
