= Dobrzyń =

Dobrzyń may refer to:

- Order of Dobrzyń, military order
- Golub-Dobrzyń, town in Poland
- Dobrzyń nad Wisłą, town in Poland
- Dobrzyń, Masovian Voivodeship (east-central Poland)
- Dobrzyń, Gmina Gubin, Krosno County in Lubusz Voivodeship (west Poland)
- Dobrzyń, Żary County in Lubusz Voivodeship (west Poland)
- Dobrzyń, Opole Voivodeship (south-west Poland)
- Dobrzyń, Pomeranian Voivodeship (north Poland)
- Dobrzyń, Warmian-Masurian Voivodeship (north Poland)
- Dobrzyń, West Pomeranian Voivodeship (north-west Poland)
- Dobrzyń Land, territory around Dobrzyń nad Wisłą

== See also ==
- Dobříň
- Dobrin (disambiguation)
