= Zawada, Gmina Gubin =

Zawada
- Village
- Location within Poland
- Coordinates: 51°55′37″N 14°48′32″E
- Country: Poland
- Voivodeship: Lubusz
- County: Krosno
- Gmina: Gubin

Zawada ([zaˈvada]; German: Saude) is a village in the administrative district of Gmina Gubin, within Krosno County, Lubusz Voivodeship, in western Poland, close to the German border.
