= Markosice =

- Village
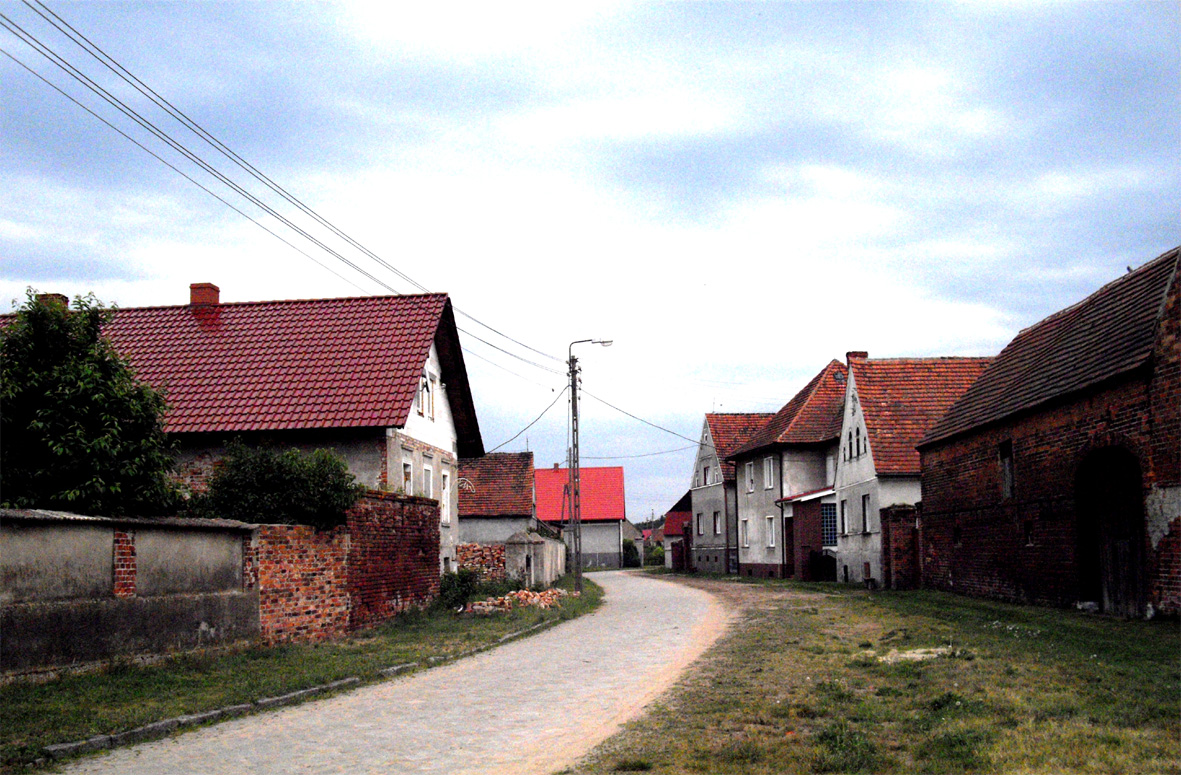

- Location within Poland
- Coordinates: 51°52′N 14°39′E
- Country: Poland
- Voivodeship: Lubusz
- County: Krosno
- Gmina: Gubin

Markosice ([markɔˈɕit͡sɛ]; German: Markersdorf; Lower Sorbian: Markośice) is a village in the administrative district of Gmina Gubin, within Krosno County, Lubusz Voivodeship, in western Poland, close to the German border.
