= Mielno, Gmina Gubin =

Mielno
- Village
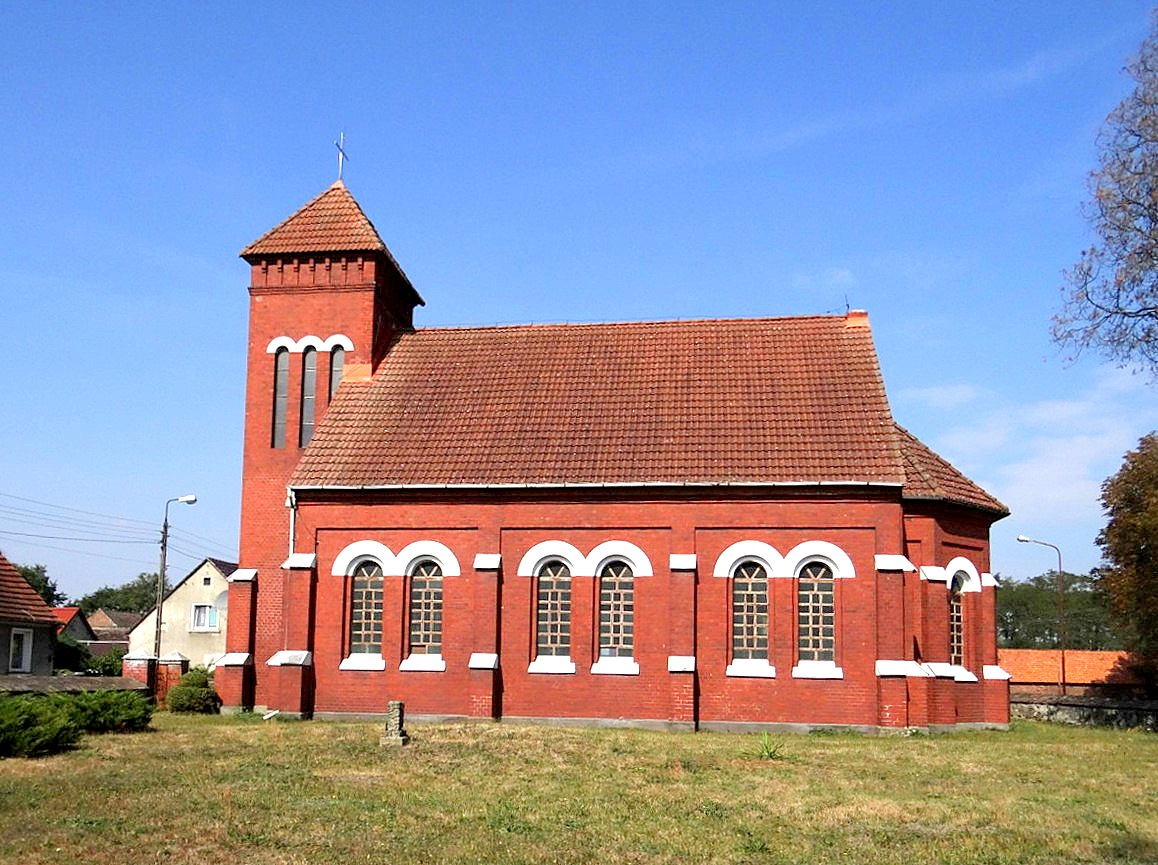
- Church of St. Francis of Assisi (built in 1892)

- Location within Poland
- Coordinates: 51°48′3″N 14°39′24″E
- Country: Poland
- Voivodeship: Lubusz
- County: Krosno
- Gmina: Gubin
- Population (approx.): 100

Mielno ([ˈmjɛlnɔ]; German: Mehlen; Lower Sorbian: Maliń) is a village in the administrative district of Gmina Gubin, within Krosno County, Lubusz Voivodeship, in western Poland, close to the German border.
