= Czarnowice =

- Village
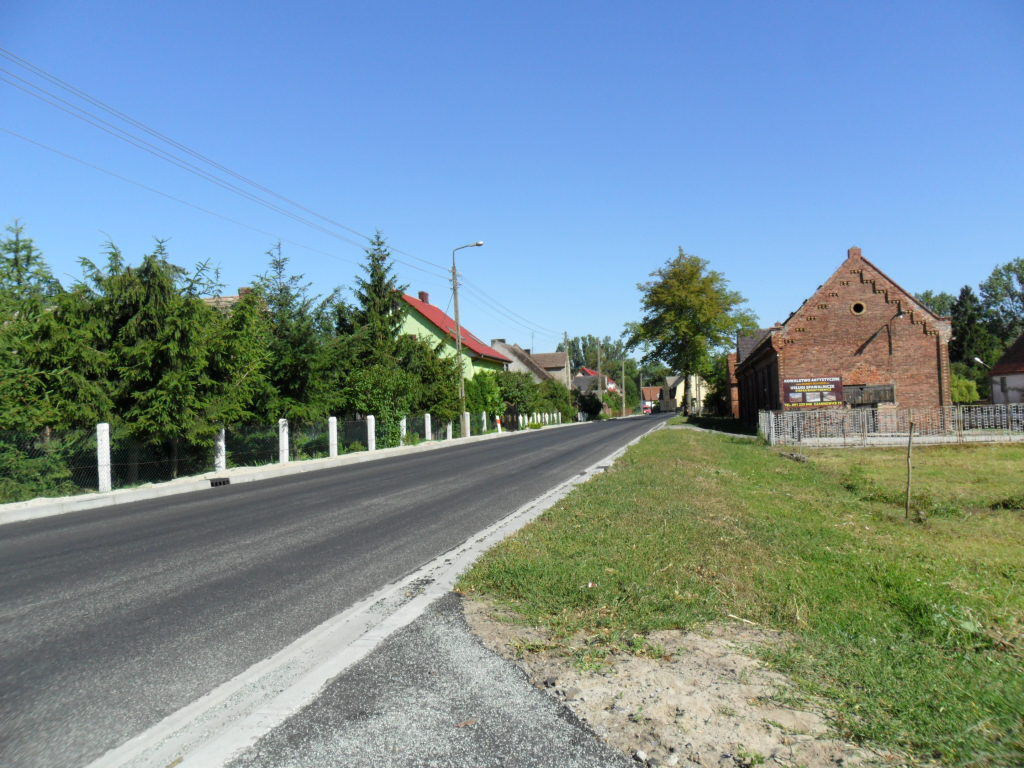

- Location within Poland
- Coordinates: 51°54′N 14°50′E
- Country: Poland
- Voivodeship: Lubusz
- County: Krosno
- Gmina: Gubin

Czarnowice ([t͡ʂarnɔˈvit͡sɛ]; German: Tzschernowitz, 1937–45 Schernewitz; Lower Sorbian: Carnojce) is a village in the administrative district of Gmina Gubin, within Krosno County, Lubusz Voivodeship, in western Poland, close to the German border.

== People ==
- Conrad von Kleist (1839-1900), German politician
