= Żytowań =

- Village
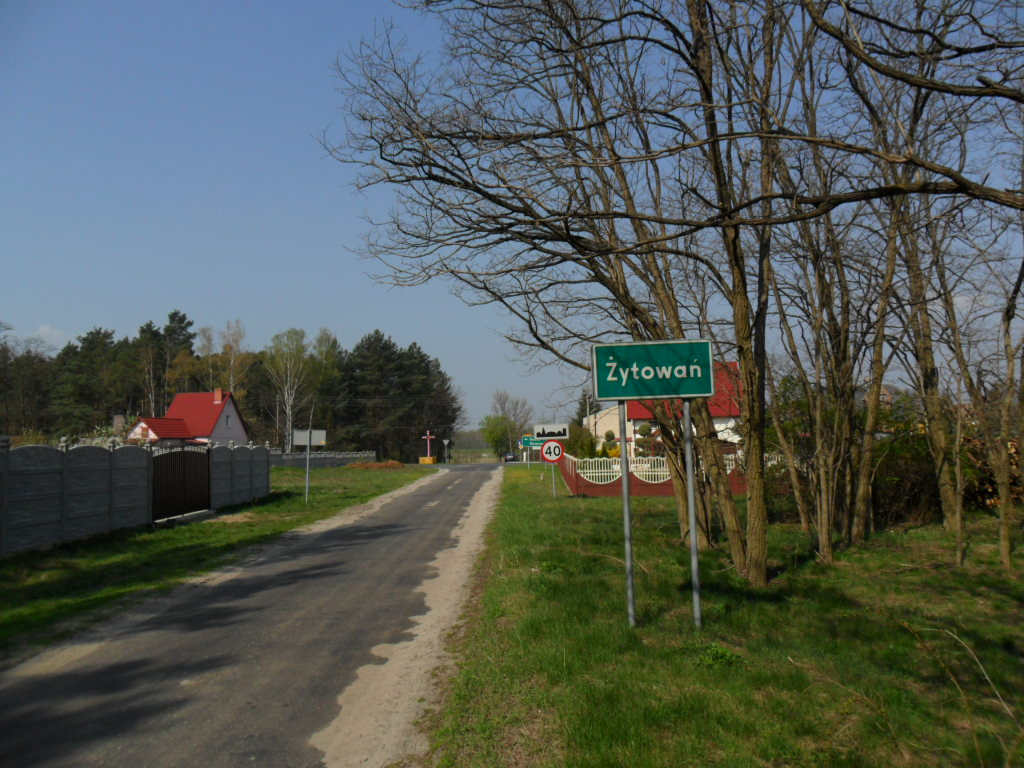

- Location within Poland
- Coordinates: 52°1′N 14°45′E
- Country: Poland
- Voivodeship: Lubusz
- County: Krosno
- Gmina: Gubin

Żytowań ([ʐɨˈtɔvaɲ]; German: Seitwann) is a village in the administrative district of Gmina Gubin, within Krosno County, Lubusz Voivodeship, in western Poland, close to the German border. As of 2011, it had a population of 211.
