= Budoradz =

- Village
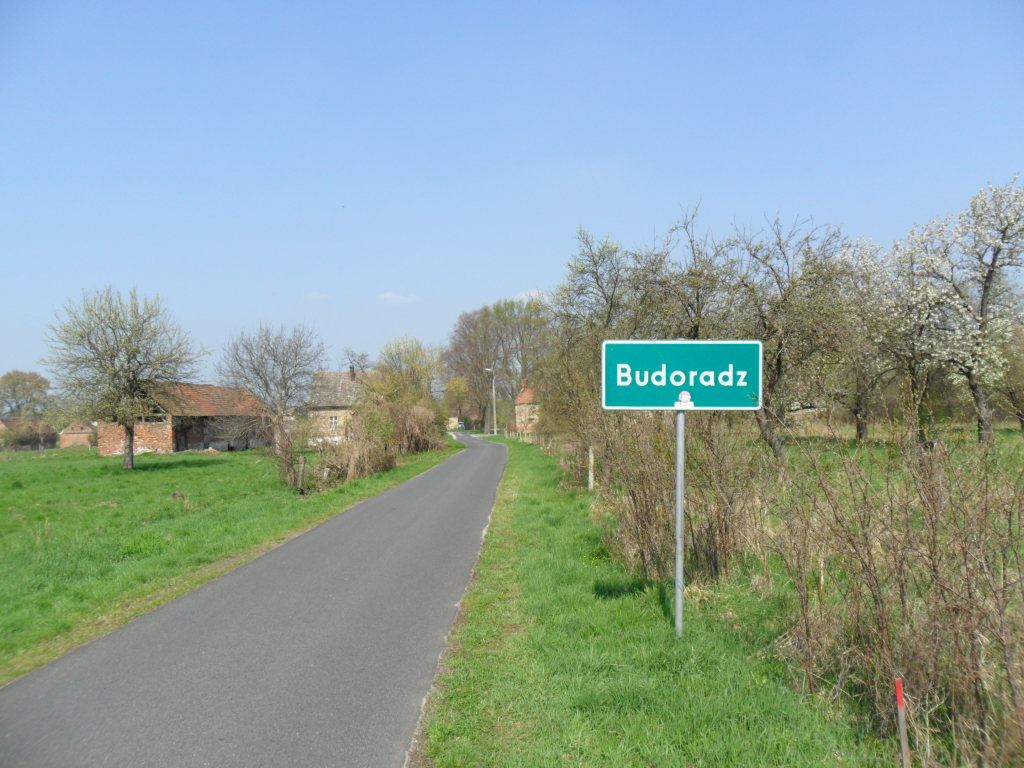
- Signage leading to Budoradz

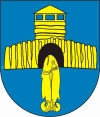
- Coat of arms

- Location within Poland
- Coordinates: 52°0′14″N 14°43′14″E
- Country: Poland
- Voivodeship: Lubusz
- County: Krosno
- Gmina: Gubin

Budoradz ([buˈdɔrat͡s]; German: Buderose; Lower Sorbian: Budoraz) is a village in the administrative district of Gmina Gubin, within Krosno County, Lubusz Voivodeship, in western Poland, close to the German border.
