= Bogdan Dobrescu =

Bogdan Dobrescu may refer to:

- Mihai Bogdan Dobrescu (born 1976), Romanian boxer
- Bogdan A. Dobrescu, Romanian-born theoretical physicist
