= Werner Drewes =

- Self-Portrait, 1947
- Born: July 27, 1899; Canig, Lower Lusatia, Brandenburg, Germany (now Kaniów, Lubusz Voivodeship, Poland)
- Died: June 21, 1985 (aged 85); Reston, Virginia
- Known for: Painter, printmaker, university professor at Washington University in St. Louis
- Style: Abstract art

Werner Drewes (1899–1985) was a painter, printmaker, and art teacher. Considered to be one of the founding fathers of American abstraction, he was one of the first artists to introduce concepts of the Bauhaus school within the United States. His mature style encompassed both nonobjective and figurative work and the emotional content of this work was consistently more expressive than formal. Drewes was as highly regarded for his printmaking as for his painting. In his role as teacher as well as artist he was largely responsible for bringing the Bauhaus aesthetic to America.

== Early life and education ==
Drewes was born in 1899 to Georg Drewes, a Lutheran pastor, and Martha Schaefer Drewes. The family lived in the village of Canig within Lower Lusatia, Germany. From age eight to eighteen he attended the Saldria Gymnasium, a boarding school in Brandenburg an der Havel. There, he showed talent both for painting and woodblock printing. Graduating from Saldria in 1917, he was drafted by the German army and served in France from then until the close of the war. About this period of his life he is reported to have said that the horrors of life at the front were only made tolerable by his sketchbook, a copy of Goethe's Faust and a volume of Nietzsche.

For a decade following the close of the war he studied, made paintings and prints, and traveled widely. His friend, Herwarth Walden, helped shape his appreciation for expressionist literature and art. Walden produced the quarterly magazine, Der Sturm and ran a gallery of contemporary art, Galerie Der Sturm, from which, in 1919, Drewes purchased an expressionist painting by William Wauer titled Blutrausch (Bloodlust). In the same year he made the acquaintance of Heinrich Vogeler and participated in Vogeler's socialist utopian artists' commune, Barkenhoff, at Worpswede, Lower Saxony. In 1919 Drewes also enrolled at the Königlich Technischen Hochschule Charlottenburg to study architecture and the following year he studied the same subject at the Technischen Hochschule Stuttgart. Preferring art over architecture, he then enrolled in Stuttgart's school of applied arts (Kunstgewerbeschule) where he studied life drawing and learned to work with colored glass. At this time he joined a group of artists and architects associated with the newly formed Merz Akademie, a college of design, art, and media in Stuttgart.

In 1921 his friendship with a French artist, Sébastien Laurent, led him to begin studies in Weimar at Bauhaus, then a new school that taught an integrated approach to the fine and applied arts. His instructors were Johannes Itten and Lyonel Feininger, whose paintings were expressionist and abstract, and Paul Klee, who taught bookbinding, stained glass, and murals. While at Bauhaus Drewes produced a portfolio of ten woodblock prints entitled "Ecce Homo."

In 1923 and 1924 he studied art during travels throughout Italy, Spain, the United States, and Central America and in 1926 he traveled to San Francisco, Japan, and Korea, thence taking the Trans-Siberian Railway to Manchuria, Moscow, and Warsaw. He later said the El Grecos he saw proved to be most influential in his work. While traveling, he exhibited: (1) etchings in Madrid (1923) and Montevideo (1924), (2) oils and etchings in Buenos Aires and St. Louis (1925), and (3) etchings in San Francisco (1926). He paid his way by the sales these exhibits produced and by taking commissions to paint portraits. While in San Francisco he set up a shop from which he sold prints he had made in Spain and South America.

After his return to Germany in 1927 he resumed study at Bauhaus, which had been forced to relocate in Dessau, Saxony-Anhalt. His instructors at that time were László Moholy-Nagy (metal work), Wassily Kandinsky, and (painting), and Lyonel Feininger (prints). At this time he also worked and exhibited in Frankfurt. With the rise of Nazism abstract artists found it increasingly difficult to sell their work and, in 1930, Drewes, finding the political pressure unbearable, emigrated to the United States. There, despite the world economic crisis, Drewes was able to earn a living as a professional artist.

== Mature style ==
After Drewes moved to New York, Kandinsky, who was both friend and mentor, continued to exert a strong influence over his style. Later in life he said he had a hard time getting away from Kandinsky's influence as he developed his own style. In time he was able to bring a more emotional approach to his work and to base it, more than Kandinsky did, on natural forms.

In 1930 Drewes had a solo exhibition at the 135th Street Branch of the New York Public Library and a two-person show at the S.P.R. Penthouse Gallery (with Carl Sprinchorn). Also in that year Kandinsky introduced Drewes to Katherine Dreier, co-founder of the Society of Independent Artists and Société Anonyme. In 1931 Drewes participated in the Société Anonyme's exhibition at the Buffalo AKG Art Museum and the Rand School. That year he showed prints and paintings first in a solo- and then in a two-person exhibition at the Morton Gallery (the latter with Herbert Reynolds Kniffin) and he also exhibited in group shows at the American Institute of Graphic Arts, the Brownell-Lamberton Galleries, and the Pynson Printers Galleries. These exhibitions established a pattern, as Drewes's work would be shown multiple times a year throughout the 1930s and 1940s.

From the first, Drewes's work captured the attention of the New York critics. A critic for The New York Times called attention to the subtle treatment in cityscape paintings he exhibited in the dual show with Carl Sprinchorn, noting that they "look fragile, as if they were made from reflections of the city in a soap bubble, rather than from life". In reviewing his solo show at the Morton Gallery, another Times critic praised his work as "solid". She said "though the paint is put on in much the same quick fashion", as the cityscapes at S.P.R. Penthouse, "the composition has something that keeps it from breaking as if touched". Of his solo show at the Morton Gallery Margaret Breuning, the critic for the New York Evening Post praised the "crisp vigor" of his portraits, his skill at handling the form and color of a still life, and the "well developed" and "imaginative" choice of viewpoint in a landscape. "One hopes," she wrote, "and confidently expects to see more work from this young artist". In reviewing the dual exhibition with Herbert Reynolds Kniffin, "T.C.L." of the Times called Drewes "an artist of promise" wrote of his "dynamic quality, an apparent fluency and economy of means", and said "he paints with sureness and vigor, with suggestion rather than in detail". Of this exhibition, the critic for the New York Sun wrote, "Mr. Drewes is an imaginative painter who is worth watching. He has emotions and they take hold of him and lead him at times into paintings that are highly unconventional. As a thousand forces are at work in America today trying to make all the artists conform to set patterns, this ability to withstand influences is a distinct asset."

Howard Devree of The New York Times praised the oils, watercolors, and drawings that Drewes showed in his solo exhibition at the Morton Galleries in 1933. He said the works gave the gallery "a radiantly prismatic aspect". He described some of the landscapes as heavily patterned, others as free and impressionistic and considered his drawings to be vigorous.

In 1934 Drewes began a long career as a teacher when he took a position teaching drawing and printmaking at the Brooklyn Museum Art School funded by the Federal Art Project of the Works Progress Administration. He later said he modeled his teaching method on the one that Kandinsky used. Drewes recalled that Kandinsky was a patient and nonjudgmental teacher who would challenge his students to work out their own solutions to non-objective projects he would set and ask them to discuss the reasons behind their choices.

In 1936, the year he became an American citizen, Drewes became a founding member of both the anti-fascist American Artists' Congress and the avant-garde American Abstract Artists group. That year he also was given a ten-year retrospective exhibition at the Uptown Gallery, and participated in group shows held by Société Anonyme (at Black Mountain College in North Carolina) and the Municipal Art Committee of New York.

In 1937 he participated in the first group exhibitions of the two organizations he had helped to found: a showing of approximately 250 members of the American Artists Congress in the International Building, Rockefeller Center, and another of the 39 members of American Abstract Artists in the Squibb Galleries. Of the former, a critic singled out a painting of his as a "well deliberated" contribution to among those that were non-objective among the polemical and Social-Realist figurative works in the show. In 1937 Drewes also exhibited at the East River Gallery in an innovative program that gave potential buyers the option of renting a work while deciding whether or not to buy it. During the same eventful year a prominent architect, Wallace Harrison, helped Drewes obtain a position at the School of Architecture of Columbia University. He remained there for the next three years teaching painting, drawing, and printmaking while also making prints for the Graphic Arts Division of the WPA Federal Art Project in New York.

Werner Drewes, "In the Blue Space," 1938, oil on canvas 35 7/8 x 41 3/4 in. (91.2 x 106.1 cm), Smithsonian American Art Museum, gift of the artist, 1975

Drewes's 1939 exhibition at the Artists' Gallery attracted the notice of New York critics. Jerome Klein in the New York Post said "he handles the vocabulary of 'non-objective' art with the sophistication and assurance of a mature artist who is particularly adept in color relations. In fact there is hardly a spot where his harmony is off the track. And a wide gamut is run from the pale tone of 'Wintry' to the vivid contrasts of 'In the Blue Space.'" Similarly, the reviewer for Art News commented on the "breadth of scope", the "clear eloquent color", and "imaginative designs", of his work and recommended the show to "anyone who searches for meaning in abstractions".

In 1940 Drewes joined with Carl Holty to open an art school called the Department of Abstract Art at the Master Institute of United Arts. Like Drewes, Holty was a founding member of American Abstract Artists and, at the time the school opened, both men were showing works at an exhibition held by that group at the Riverside Museum. The institute and museum were both housed in a 29-story Art-Nouveau apartment building on the upper west side. While teaching at the Institute, Drewes continued as an instructor of drawing and painting at Columbia and held two other positions: director of the WPA/FAP Graphic Arts Project and map maker for the Fairchild Aerial Survey Company.

In the 1930s Fairchild Aerial Survey Company used aerial photography to make tax maps and other political maps for cities and towns. In 1940 the U.S. Army Air Corps began testing the airplanes and cameras of the company for aerial reconnaissance and the preparation wide-area survey maps.

In 1941 Howard Devree reviewed a second solo exhibition at Artists Gallery. He wrote that Drewes was a clever artist who could give a human and emotional content to abstract art thus overcoming the sterility that characterized most non-objective art. The gouache, "Grids in Space" shows the emotional content of which Devree wrote. In 1944 and 1945 Drewes worked at Stanley William Hayter's Atelier 17 in New York City. Together, they improved the intaglio technique in color print-making.

== Postwar ==
Drewes's work continued to appear in group exhibitions throughout the years of World War II and in 1945 a solo exhibition at the Kleemann Gallery attracted unusual critical notice. Edward Alden Jewell of The New York Times observed that his work was not exclusively non-objective but included expressionist abstractions that were based on natural objects. The critic for the New York Sun said this tendency to naturalism was handled "lightly and slightly, insisting only on things that seemed essential". Later in the year another Sun critic made the dual aspect of Drewes's work more explicit. Drewes, he said, "seems to differ from most confirmed modernists in that he turns at will from the purely abstract to things that at most are semi-abstract, and in one still life painted in the present year he indulges in a degree of objectivity in the fruit and in the half of a wine bottle that is permitted to show that would shock the believers in non-objective art".

In 1945 Drewes taught design, printmaking, and photography at Brooklyn College and then shifted to Chicago where he joined with Moholy-Nagy to teach at the Institute of Design.

In 1946 he joined the faculty of the St. Louis School of Fine Arts (now the Sam Fox School of Design & Visual Arts) at Washington University in St. Louis. Soon after his arrival he made friends with the German artist, Max Beckmann, who had been hired as an art teacher at the university and who remained there for the next two years. Once settled in St. Louis, Drewes attained a level of financial stability that had until then eluded him. The university promoted him to professor of design and first-year program director and he was thereafter able both to support his family and to devote time to making works of art.

In 1948 Dreves was commissioned by the Edward L. Kramer family to paint a mural on the large front of a new house located at 24 Northcote Drive, Brentwood, MO (see figure). He also painted two smaller mural on the wings of the house. A subsequent owner painted over the mural.

Werner Drewes, "Study: Blue House in the Woods 2," 1950, 10 x 7 3/4 inches (25.4 x 19.7cm), oil on parchment, Tobey C. Moss Gallery

While he lived in St. Louis his work frequently appeared in New York galleries. Reviewing a solo exhibition in 1947, Howard Devree praised his turning "from sheer abstraction to well-knit pictures with recognizably representational forms" and noted, "for years I have watched Werner Drewes in his exploration of the field of abstraction. In his current show at Henry Kleemann's Gallery he reveals that he has not abandoned the quest. Rather, he has extended it. In common with many of the best American painters he has submitted himself to a discipline which is definitely paying off." In 1949 another New York Times critic said he "constructs efficient uncompromising designs in aggressive geometrical forms whose separate identity is emphasized by boundaries of harsh, clear color". 1959 Drewes was awarded a purchase prize at the 25th Anniversary National Fine Prints Competition of Associated American Artists.

== Later life and work ==
Werner Drewes, "Autumn Gold," color woodblock, 1969, 23 x 13 inches, Smithsonian American Art Museum, gift of the artist

Drewes retired in 1965 and moved to Reston, Virginia, where he remained active as an artist until his death in 1985. He enjoyed great recognition for his work in these later years. In 1984 a large retrospective at the Smithsonian American Art Museum was devoted entirely to his printmaking. A prolific printmaker, Drewes produced during his lifetime some 732 fine prints, including 269 etchings and drypoints, 30 lithographs, 14 celloprints, a lone silkscreen, and 418 woodcuts, of which 255 were in color. "Autumn Gold" is one of the more colorful of Drewes's non-objective woodblock prints.

== Family and personal life ==
The information in this section expands upon and partly repeats the information given above about Drewes's life. He was born on July 27, 1899, in what was then Canig, Lower Lusatia, Brandenburg, Germany, and is now Kaniów, Lubusz Voivodeship, Poland. His name is almost always given as simply Werner Drewes, but his full name was Werner Bernhard Drewes and he is sometimes referred to as Werner B. Drewes. He was the son of Pastor Georg Drewes and his wife Martha Schaefer Drewes. He attended boarding school at the Saldria Gymnasium in Brandenburg an der Havel from 1907 to 1917. At age 18 he was drafted into the German army and served in France, on the Western Front until the end of the war. On returning to civilian life he began to study architecture at the Charlottenburg Technischen Hochschule in Berlin. To support himself, he took a job at the Berlin gas and waterworks. He also spent some time at the Barkenhoff artists' commune. His next place of study was the Technischen Hochschule Stuttgart and then, switching from architecture to the visual arts, he enrolled in Stuttgart's Kunstgewerbeschule and joined the Merz Akademie, also in Stuttgart. He completed his education at Bauhaus, where he studied from 1921 to 1923 in Weimar and from 1927 to 1930 in Dessau.

When not attending a school of art, Drewes traveled widely. During 1923 and 1924 he visited places in Italy, Spain, Central America, and the United States and in 1926 he returned to the United States and traveled thence to Japan, Korea, Manchuria, Moscow, and Warsaw. In 1924, while in Madrid, he married Margarete Schrobsdorff, a childhood sweetheart who was also traveling to study art. Margarete had been born on June 16, 1895, in Wust, Saxony-Anhalt, Germany. Her father was Max Schrobsdorff and her mother, Martha Wreger Schrobsdorff. During their marriage she pursued her own art form of weaving and rug making. On November 22, 1927, the couple gave birth to their first child, a son, Harald and two years later, on January 9, 1929, their second son, Wolfram, was born.

In 1930 the family emigrated to the United States and rented an apartment in New York in which to live. At this time Drewes enrolled in the Art Students League. A year later Margarete (now Margaret) gave birth to their third son, Bernard. In 1935 Drewes began his long teaching career with a position at the Brooklyn Museum School and in 1936 he became a citizen of the United States. From the mid-1930s through the 1960s, Drewes flourished both as artist and teacher.

Margaret Drewes died in St. Louis on September 27, 1959. A year later Drewes married Mary Louise Lischer Terhune, who, like him, taught at Washington University in St. Louis. As well as teaching English, she crafted jewelry. In 1965 Drewes retired from Washington University in St. Louis and moved to Point Pleasant, in Bucks County, Pennsylvania. He moved to Reston, Virginia, in 1972 and died there on June 21, 1985.

== Exhibitions ==
- 1923 Solo exhibition, etchings, Madrid, Spain
- 1924 Solo exhibition, etchings, Salon Maverof, Montevideo, Uruguay
- 1925 Solo exhibition, Buenos Aires, Argentina
- 1925 Solo exhibition, Central Public Library, St. Louis, Missouri
- 1926 Solo exhibition, etchings, Gump's, San Francisco, California
- 1928 Solo exhibition, Galerie Flechtheim & Kahnweiler, Frankfurt, Germany
- 1929 Solo exhibition, oils, Galerie del Vecchio, Leipzig, Germany
- 1930 Two-person exhibition (with Carl Sprinchorn), S.P.R. Penthouse
- 1930 Solo exhibition, 135th Street branch of the Public Library
- 1931 Group exhibition, Société Anonyme, Albright Art Center, Buffalo, New York
- 1931 Two-person exhibition (with Herbert Reynolds Kniffin), Morton Gallery
- 1931 Group exhibition, "Fifty Prints of the Year," American Institute of Graphic Arts, Art Center
- 1931 Group exhibition, Brownell-Lamberton Galleries
- 1931 Group exhibition, prints, Pynson Printers Gallery
- 1931 Group exhibition, Société Anonyme, Rand School
- 1931 Solo exhibition, oil paintings, Morton Gallery
- 1931 Solo exhibition, Pent-House Gallery
- 1932 Group exhibition, exhibition and auction, Indoor Art Market
- 1932 Group exhibition, German-American Conference, Hotel Astor
- 1932 Group exhibition, Milch Galleries
- 1932 Group exhibition, Times Gallery
- 1932 Group exhibition, Watercolors, Morton Gallery
- 1932 Solo exhibition, New School for Social Research
- 1933 Group exhibition, Macy Galleries
- 1933 Group exhibition, annual watercolor show, Morton Gallery
- 1933 Solo exhibition, Morton Gallery
- 1934 Solo exhibition, Wells College, Aurora, New York
- 1935 Group exhibition, Brooklyn Museum Gallery for Living Artists
- 1935 Group exhibition, Ten-Dollar Gallery
- 1935 Group exhibition, Uptown Gallery
- 1935 Group exhibition, prints, New School for Social Research
- 1936 Group exhibition, Société Anonyme, Black Mountain College, North Carolina
- 1936 Group exhibition, Temporary Galleries of the Municipal Art Committee
- 1936 Solo exhibition, Ten-Year Retrospective, Uptown Gallery
- 1936 Solo exhibition, Bennington College, Bennington, Vermont
- 1936 Solo exhibition, Wadsworth Atheneum, Hartford, Connecticut
- 1937 Group exhibition, first annual membership exhibition, American Artists Congress, International Building, Rockefeller Center
- 1937 Group exhibition, American Abstract Artists, Squibb Building
- 1937 group exhibition, East River Gallery
- 1937 Group exhibition, Temporary Galleries of the Municipal Art Committee
- 1937 Solo exhibition, University Hall, Columbia University
- 1938 Group exhibition, American Abstract Artists, National Academy of Design
- 1938 Group exhibition, Municipal Art Galleries
- 1938 Group exhibition, Second Annual Exhibition, American Artists Congress, Wanamaker's Store
- 1939 Group exhibition, Pedac Galleries
- 1939 Solo exhibition, oils, Artists Gallery
- 1940 Group exhibition, American Abstract Artists American Fine Arts Buildings (June 5–16)
- 1940 Group exhibition, American Abstract Artists St. Etienne Gallery (May 22-June 12
- 1940 Group exhibition, An American Group Inc., 1939-40 New York World's Fair, American Art Today Pavilion
- 1941 Group exhibition, American Abstract Artists Riverside Museum
- 1941 Group exhibition, Brooklyn Museum
- 1941 Group exhibition, Karl Lilienfeld Gallery
- 1941 Group exhibition, Masters and Vanguard of Modern Art, Nierendorf Gallery
- 1941 Group exhibition, Morton Gallery
- 1941 Group exhibition, Museum of Non-objective Painting
- 1941 Solo exhibition, oils, Artists Gallery
- 1942 Group exhibition, American Abstract Artists Fine Arts Building
- 1942 Group exhibition, Lilienfeld Galleries
- 1943 Group exhibition, Macy & Co. Galleries
- 1943 Group exhibition, Water-color Exhibition, Brooklyn Museum
- 1943 Solo exhibition, Community Arts Building, Utica, New York
- 1944 Group exhibition, American Abstract Artists Mortimer Brandt Gallery
- 1944 Group exhibition, Color Prints, Arts Club, Washington, D.C.
- 1944 Group exhibition, Lilienfeld Galleries
- 1944 Group exhibition, Morton Gallery
- 1944 Group exhibition, Museum of Non-Objective Art
- 1945 Two-person exhibition (with Franz Lerch), Lilienfeld Gallery
- 1945 Group exhibition, American Abstract Artists Riverside Museum
- 1945 Solo exhibition, Kleemann Gallery
- 1945 Solo exhibition, prints, Indiana University, Bloomington
- 1946 Group exhibition, American Abstract Artists American-British Art Center
- 1946 Group exhibition, Advancing American Art exhibition, sponsored by the U.S. Department of State, Metropolitan Museum
- 1946 Group exhibition, Exhibition and Auction; Food Parcels for Europe, Nierendorf Gallery
- 1946 Group exhibition, Pan American Union, Washington, D.C.
- 1946 Group exhibition, Pinacotheca
- 1946 Group exhibition, Troeger-Phillips, Inc.
- 1946 Solo exhibition, Kleemann Gallery
- 1947 Group exhibition, American Abstract Artists Riverside Museum
- 1947 Group exhibition, Contemporary American Painting Annual, Whitney Museum
- 1947 Group exhibition, Grand Central Galleries
- 1947 Group exhibition, Graphic Circle group, American University, Washington, D.C.
- 1947 Group exhibition, Graphic Circle group, Seligmann Gallery
- 1947 Group exhibition, Landscapes of Four Centuries, Koetser Gallery
- 1947 Group exhibition, Painting in the United States, 1947, Carnegie Institute, Pittsburgh, Pennsylvania
- 1947 Group exhibition, Thirty-second Annual Exhibition of American Etchers, Gravers, Lithographers and Woodcutters, Inc., National Academy
- 1947 Solo exhibition, watercolors, Kleemann Gallery
- 1948 Solo exhibition, Graphic Arts Section, Smithsonian Institution
- 1949 Group exhibition, Kleemann Gallery
- 1949 Solo exhibition, Pen and Palette Gallery, St. Louis, Missouri
- 1951 Group exhibition, American Abstract Artists Whitney Museum
- 1951 Group exhibition, Artists Gallery
- 1951 Group exhibition, oils, Argent Gallery
- 1951 Solo exhibition, Gallery Lutz and Meyer, Stuttgart, Germany
- 1953 Group exhibition, Woodstock Artists' Association, Woodstock, New York
- 1953 Solo exhibition, Artists Guild, St. Louis, Missouri
- 1954 Solo exhibition, prints, Beloit College, Beloit, Wisconsin
- 1956 Group exhibition, prints, Commeter Galerie, Hamburg, Germany
- 1956 Group exhibition, Martin Schweig Gallery, St. Louis, Missouri
- 1956 Group exhibition, prints, Locke Gallery, San Francisco, California
- 1956 Solo exhibition, Commeter Gallery, Hamburg, Germany
- 1957 Solo exhibition, woodcuts, Cassell and Paul Gallery, St. Louis, Missouri
- 1957 Solo exhibition, prints, Brooks Memorial Art Gallery, Memphis, Tennessee
- 1958 Solo exhibition, woodcuts, IFA Galleries, Washington, D.C.
- 1958 Solo exhibition, woodcuts, Stephens College, Columbia, Missouri
- 1958 Solo exhibition, Art Mart Gallery, Clayton, Missouri
- 1958 Solo exhibition, woodcuts, Springfield Art Museum, Springfield, Missouri
- 1958 Group exhibition, Commonwealth School, Boston, Massachusetts
- 1959 Group exhibition, Kleemann Gallery
- 1959 Solo exhibition, Gaga Galerie, Boston, Massachusetts
- 1960 Solo exhibition, Art Mart Gallery, Clayton, Missouri
- 1961 Solo exhibition, watercolors, Art Alliance, Carnegie Library, Paducah, Kentucky
- 1961 Solo exhibition, Cleveland Museum of Art, Cleveland, Ohio
- 1962 Solo exhibition, Achenbach Foundation for the Graphic Arts, Museum of the Legion of Honor, San Francisco, California
- 1963 Solo exhibition, Webster College, Webster Groves, Missouri
- 1964 Solo exhibition, Martin Schweig Gallery, St. Louis, Missouri
- 1965 Group exhibition, Esther Stuttman Gallery, Washington, D.C.
- 1966 Solo exhibition, Everhart Museum, Scranton, Pennsylvania
- 1968 Solo exhibition, Trenton State College, Trenton, New Jersey
- 1969 Solo exhibition, Four Decades of Woodcuts, National Collection of Fine Arts, Washington, D.C.
- 1971 Solo exhibition, Hom Gallery, Bethesda, Maryland
- 1972 Group exhibition, Squibb Galleries, Lawrence, New Jersey
- 1976 Solo exhibition, Princeton Gallery, Princeton, New Jersey
- 1978 Two-person exhibition, Sid Deutsch Gallery
- 1979 Group exhibition, Sid Deutsch Gallery
- 1979 Solo exhibition, Washington University in St. Louis
- 1984 Group exhibition, American Abstract Paintings From the 1930s and 1940s, Washburn Gallery
- 1985 Group exhibition, Associated American Artists
- 1985 Solo exhibition, National Museum of American Art
- 1986 Solo exhibition, Princeton Gallery, Princeton, New Jersey
- 1986 Solo exhibition, Selective Retrospective, Tobey C. Moss Gallery, Los Angeles, California
- 1988 Group exhibition, Foundations of American Avant-Garde, Struve Gallery, Chicago, Illinois
- 1989 Group exhibition, American Abstraction 1930-1945, National Museum of American Art, Washington, D.C.
- 1990 Solo exhibition, Tobey C. Moss Gallery, Los Angeles, California

== Web galleries ==
- Werner Drewes at William Havu Gallery
- DrewesFineArt.com
- Werner Drewes at Conrad R. Graeber Fine Art
- Werner Drewes, Aaron Payne Fine Art
- Werner Drewes, Artsy
- Werner Drewes Fine Art
- Drewes, PrintsAmerica
