= Drzeńsk Wielki =

- Village
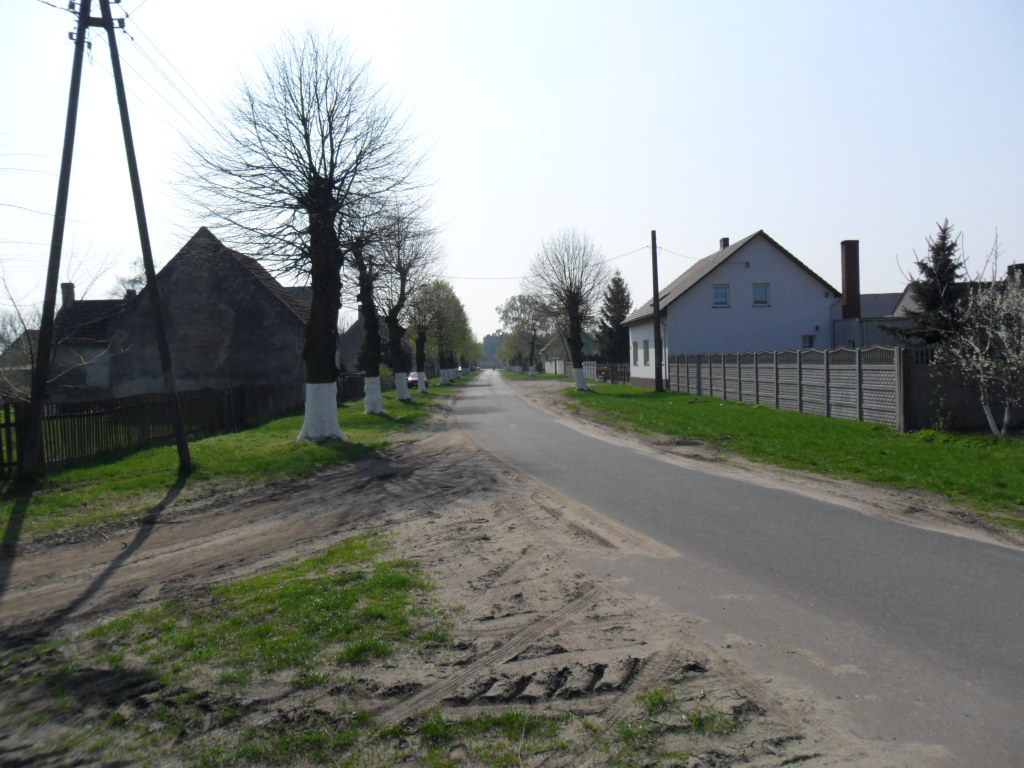

- Location within Poland
- Coordinates: 52°0′N 14°47′E
- Country: Poland
- Voivodeship: Lubusz
- County: Krosno
- Gmina: Gubin

Drzeńsk Wielki (Polish pronunciation: [dʐɛj̃sk ˈfjɛlkʲi]; German: Groß Drenzig) is a village in the administrative district of Gmina Gubin, within Krosno County, Lubusz Voivodeship, in western Poland, close to the German border.
