= Dobrina =

Dobrina can refer to:

- Dobrina Cristeva (b. 1968), Bulgarian-Mexican actor
- Dobrina, Šentjur, settlement in eastern Slovenia
- Dobrina, Žetale, settlement in eastern Slovenia

== See also ==
- Dobrin (disambiguation)
- Dobrynia (disambiguation)
- Dobrynin (disambiguation)
