= Polanowice, Lubusz Voivodeship =

Polanowice
- Village
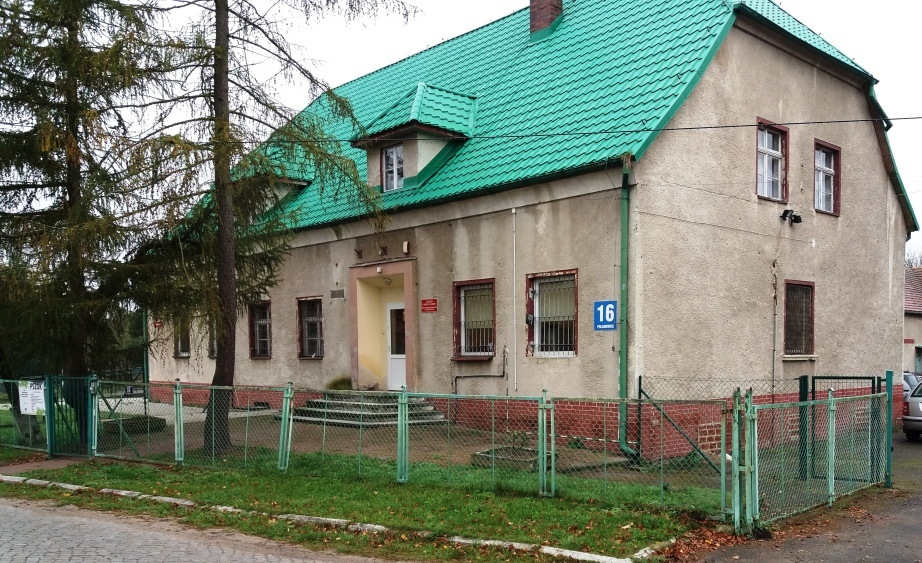
- Former Polish Border Protection Forces post in Polanowice

- Location within Poland
- Coordinates: 51°53′20″N 14°41′17″E
- Country: Poland
- Voivodeship: Lubusz
- County: Krosno
- Gmina: Gubin
- Time zone: UTC+1 (CET)
  - Summer (DST): UTC+2 (CEST)
- Postal code: 66-629
- Vehicle registration: FKR

Polanowice ([pɔlanɔˈvit͡sɛ]; German: Niemitzsch) is a village in the administrative district of Gmina Gubin, within Krosno County, Lubusz Voivodeship, in western Poland, close to the German border.

== History ==
The burgward of Niempsi was first mentioned in a deed of donation issued by Emperor Otto III in 1000 AD, when it passed to the estates of Nienburg Abbey. Therefore, one of the oldest settlements in Lower Lusatia, the former Slavic gord may already had been part of the vast Marca Geronis, near the eastern border with the medieval Kingdom of Poland. It was conquered by the Polish ruler Bolesław I the Brave in 1002. The stronghold was part of the first line of defense along the Lusatian Neisse, in the event of a possible German invasion from the west. It returned to the March of Lusatia by 1032. Later it was various times under Polish, Czech and German rule.
