= Nowa Wioska, Gmina Gubin =

Nowa Wioska
- Village
- Location within Poland
- Coordinates: 51°50′N 14°41′E
- Country: Poland
- Voivodeship: Lubusz
- County: Krosno
- Gmina: Gubin

Nowa Wioska ([ˈnɔva ˈvjɔska]; German: Neudörfel) is a village in the administrative district of Gmina Gubin, within Krosno County, Lubusz Voivodeship, in western Poland, close to the German border.
