= Pole, Lubusz Voivodeship =

Pole
- Village
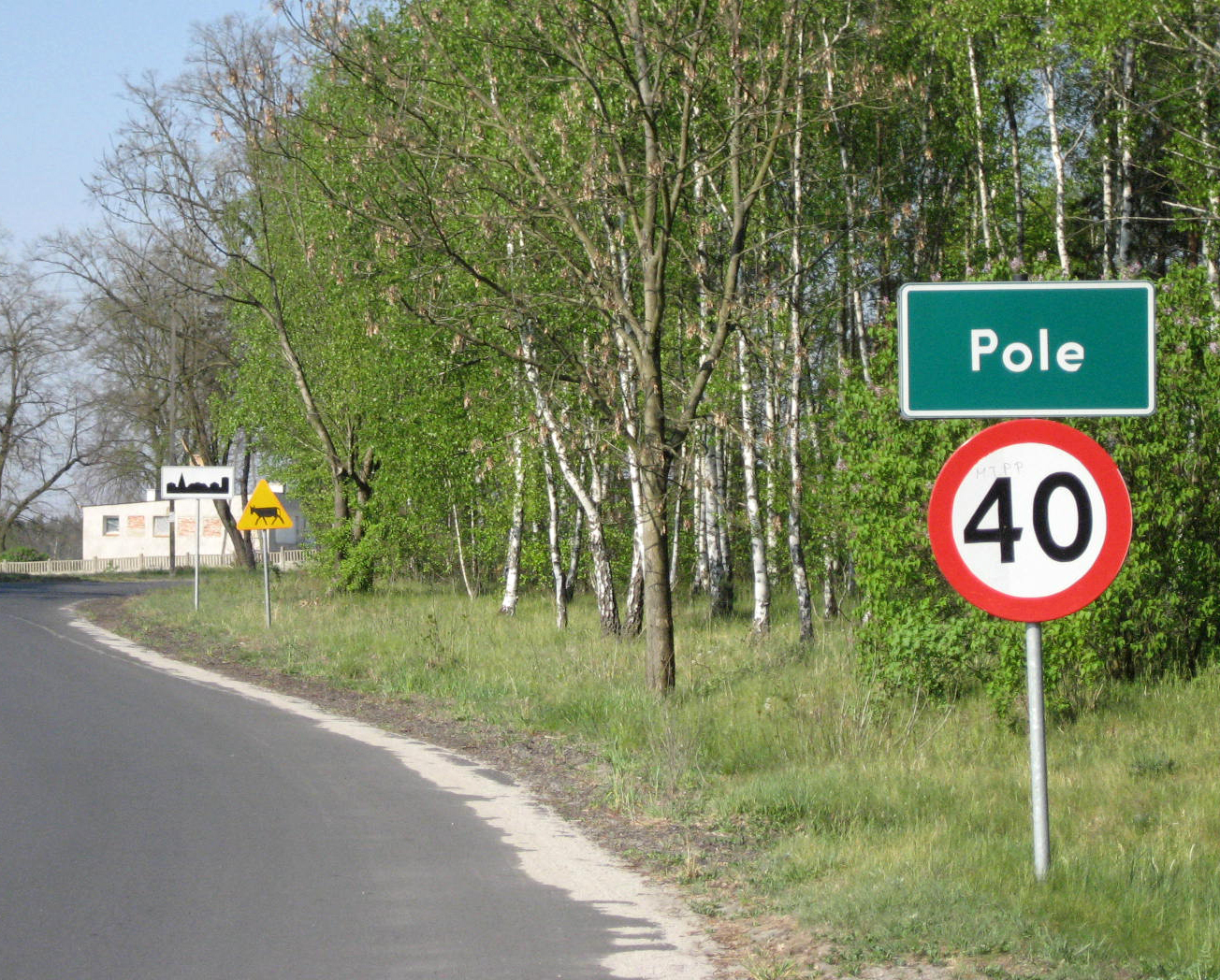

- Location within Poland
- Coordinates: 51°56′N 14°51′E
- Country: Poland
- Voivodeship: Lubusz
- County: Krosno
- Gmina: Gubin

Pole ([ˈpɔlɛ]; German: Pohlo) is a village in the administrative district of Gmina Gubin, within Krosno County, Lubusz Voivodeship, in western Poland, close to the German border.
