= Pleśno, Lubusz Voivodeship =

Pleśno
- Village
- Location within Poland
- Coordinates: 51°55′03″N 14°45′29″E
- Country: Poland
- Voivodeship: Lubusz
- County: Krosno
- Gmina: Gubin

Pleśno ([ˈplɛɕnɔ]; German: Beesgen-Plesse) is a village in the administrative district of Gmina Gubin, within Krosno County, Lubusz Voivodeship, in western Poland, close to the German border.
