= Wielotów =

- Village
- Location within Poland
- Coordinates: 51°50′N 14°43′E
- Country: Poland
- Voivodeship: Lubusz
- County: Krosno
- Gmina: Gubin

Wielotów ([vjɛˈlɔtuf]; German: Weltho) is a village in the administrative district of Gmina Gubin, within Krosno County, Lubusz Voivodeship, in western Poland, close to the German border.
