= Brzozów, Lubusz Voivodeship =

Brzozów
- Village
- Location within Poland
- Coordinates: 51°50′13″N 14°40′28″E
- Country: Poland
- Voivodeship: Lubusz
- County: Krosno
- Gmina: Gubin

Brzozów ([ˈbʐɔzuf]: German: Birkenberge) is a village in the administrative district of Gmina Gubin, within Krosno County, Lubusz Voivodeship, in western Poland, close to the German border.
