= Dzikowo =

Dzikowo may refer to several places:

- Dzikowo, Kuyavian-Pomeranian Voivodeship (north-central Poland)
- Dzikowo, Gorzów County in Lubusz Voivodeship (west Poland)
- Dzikowo, Gmina Gubin, Krosno County in Lubusz Voivodeship (west Poland)
- Dzikowo, Wałcz County in West Pomeranian Voivodeship (north-west Poland)
- Dzikowo, Koszalin County in West Pomeranian Voivodeship (north-west Poland)
- Dzikowo, Myślibórz County in West Pomeranian Voivodeship (north-west Poland)
