= Strzegów, Lubusz Voivodeship =

Strzegów
- Village
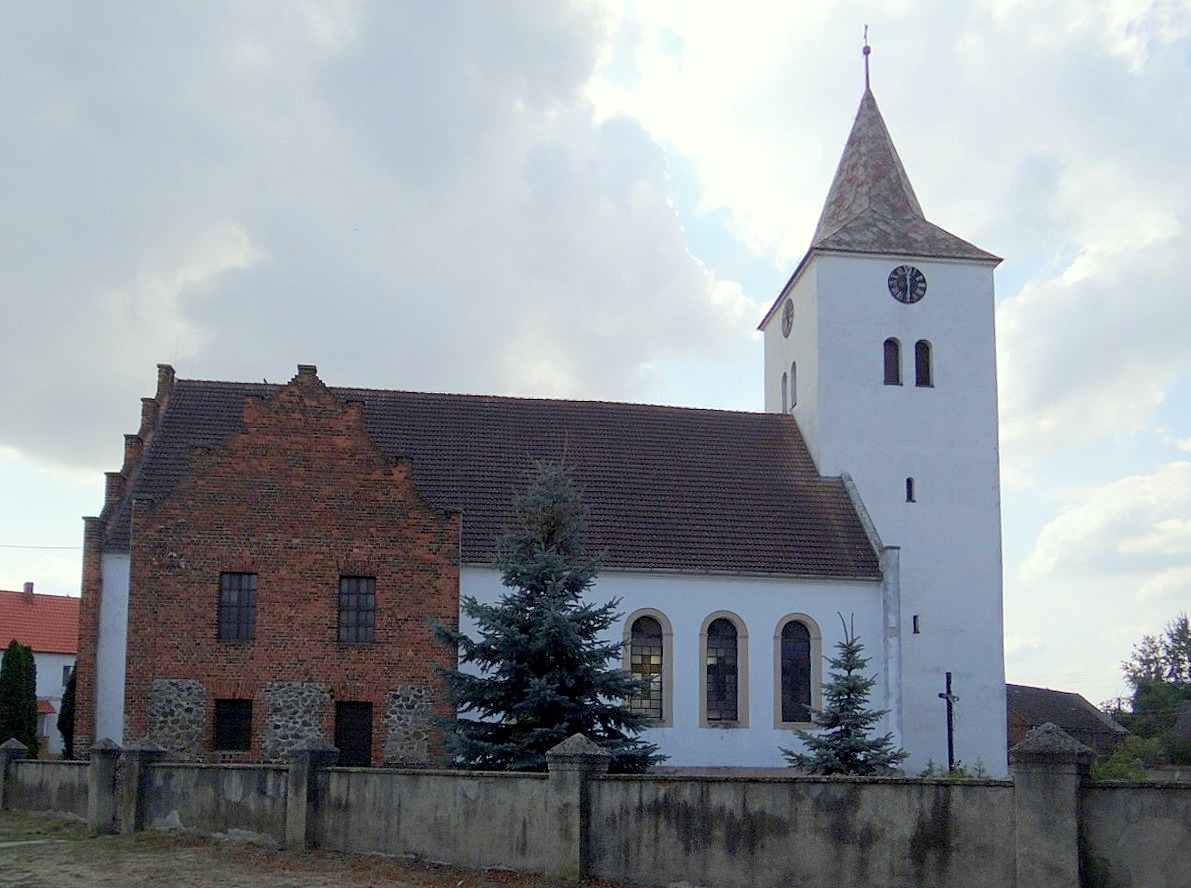
- Catholic church

- Location within Poland
- Coordinates: 51°49′N 14°37′E
- Country: Poland
- Voivodeship: Lubusz
- County: Krosno
- Gmina: Gubin

Strzegów ([ˈstʂɛɡuf]; German: Strega; Lower Sorbian: Stśěgow) is a village in the administrative district of Gmina Gubin, within Krosno County, Lubusz Voivodeship, in western Poland, close to the German border.
