= Kosarzyn, Lubusz Voivodeship =

Kosarzyn
- Village
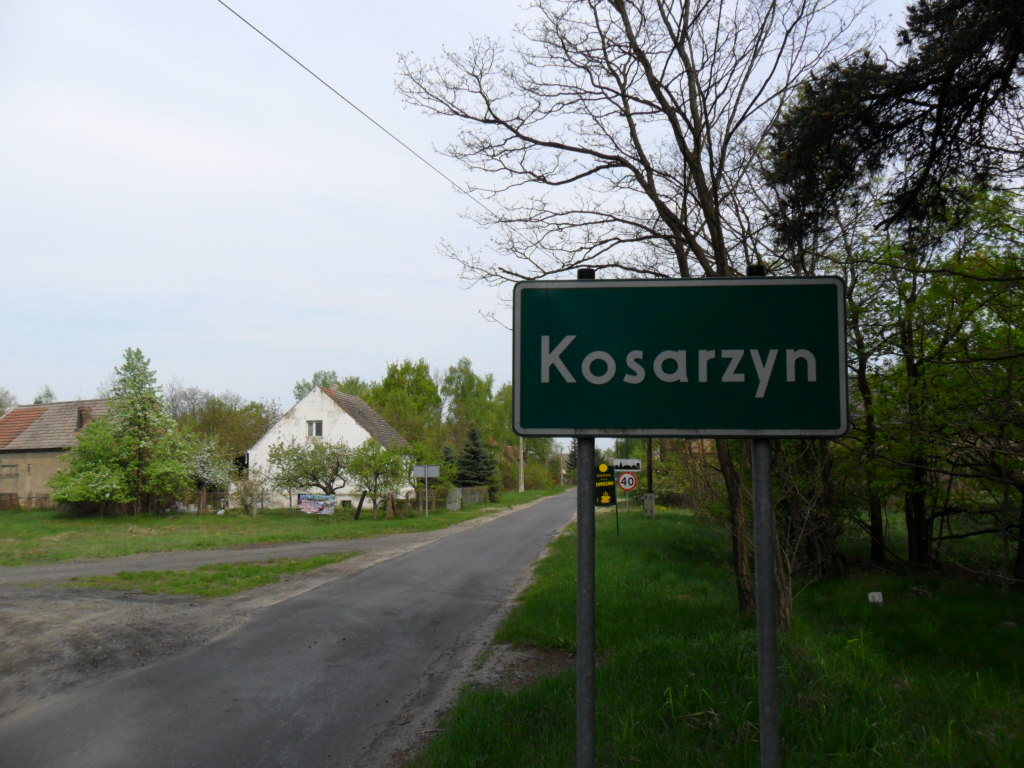

- Location within Poland
- Coordinates: 52°4′N 14°46′E
- Country: Poland
- Voivodeship: Lubusz
- County: Krosno
- Gmina: Gubin

Kosarzyn ([kɔˈsaʐɨn]; German: Kuschern) is a village in the administrative district of Gmina Gubin, within Krosno County, Lubusz Voivodeship, in western Poland, close to the German border.
