= Gubinek =

- Village
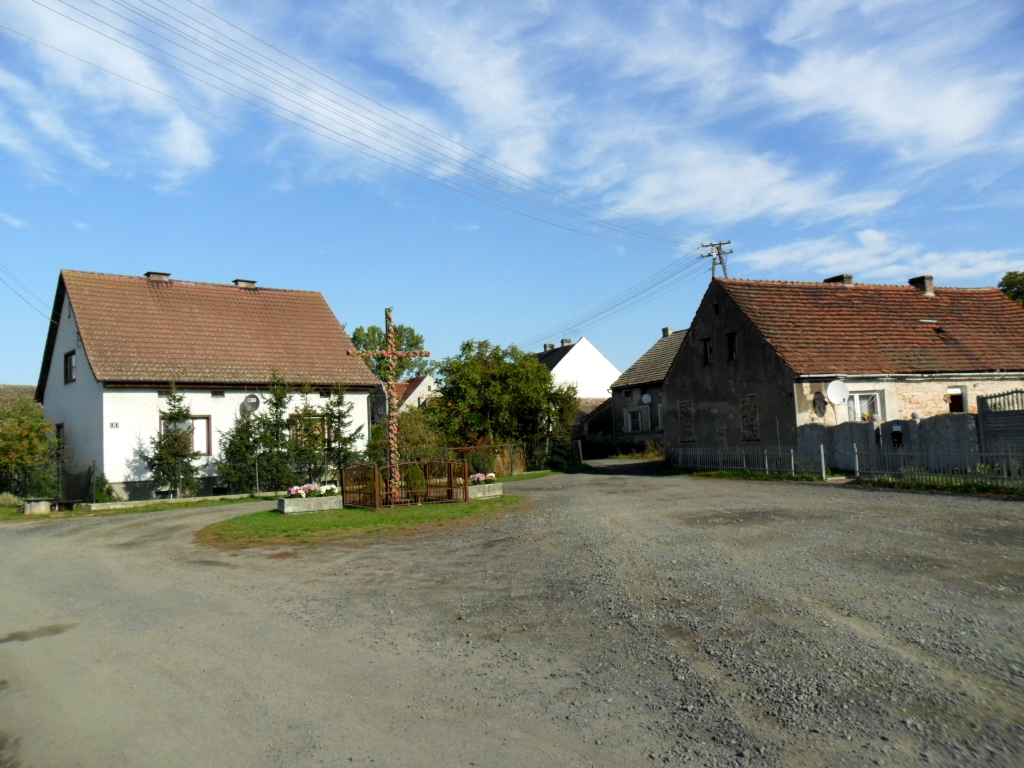

- Location within Poland
- Coordinates: 51°56′N 14°43′E
- Country: Poland
- Voivodeship: Lubusz
- County: Krosno
- Gmina: Gubin
- Population: 140

Gubinek ([ɡuˈbinɛk]; German: Gubinchen; Lower Sorbian: Gubink) is a village in the administrative district of Gmina Gubin, within Krosno County, Lubusz Voivodeship, in western Poland, close to the German border.
