= Bieżyce =

- Village
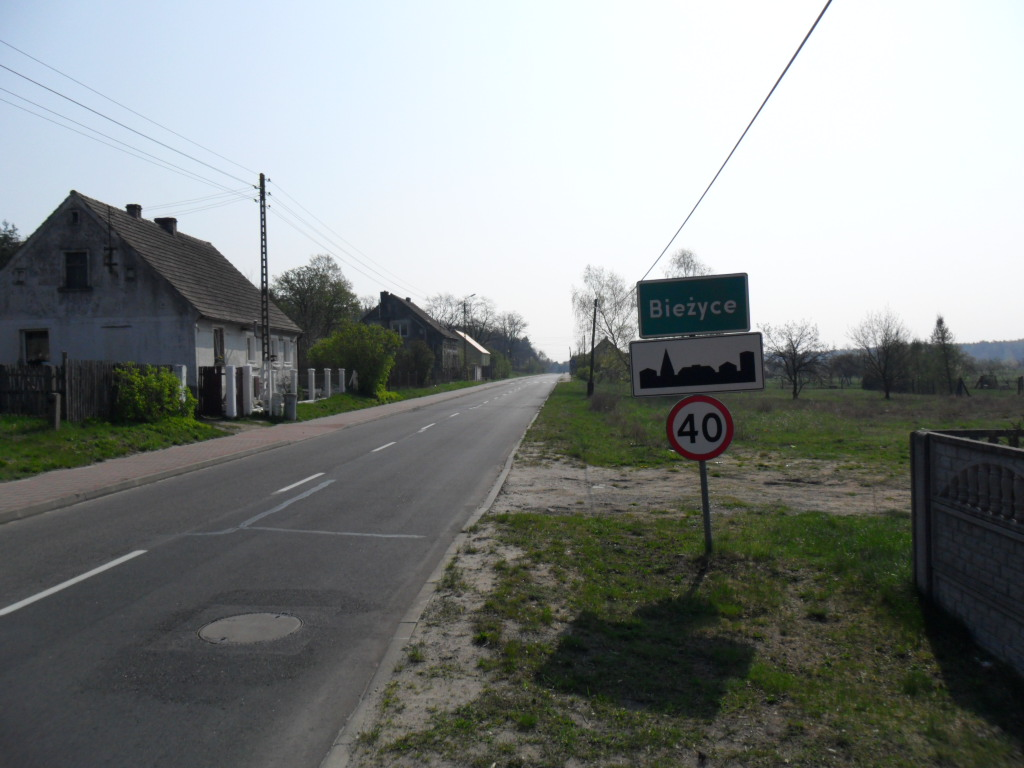

- Location within Poland
- Coordinates: 51°56′N 14°46′E
- Country: Poland
- Voivodeship: Lubusz
- County: Krosno
- Gmina: Gubin

Bieżyce ([bjɛˈʐɨt͡sɛ]; German: Groß Bösitz) is a village in the administrative district of Gmina Gubin, within Krosno County, Lubusz Voivodeship, in western Poland, close to the German border.

== Notable residents ==
- Günther Konopacki (10 October 1921 – 23 June 1987), wehrmacht officer
