= Jaromirowice =

- Village
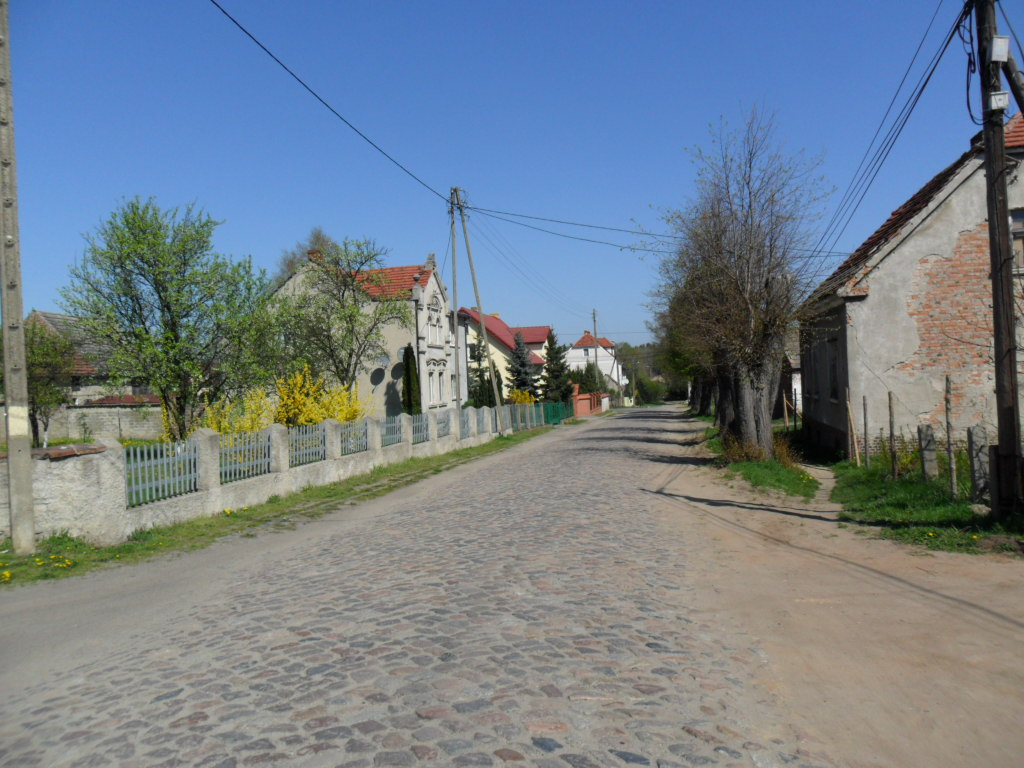

- Location within Poland
- Coordinates: 51°57′N 14°44′E
- Country: Poland
- Voivodeship: Lubusz
- County: Krosno
- Gmina: Gubin

Jaromirowice ([jarɔmirɔˈvit͡sɛ]; German: Germersdorf) is a village in the administrative district of Gmina Gubin, within Krosno County, Lubusz Voivodeship, in western Poland, close to the German border.
