= Późna =

- Village
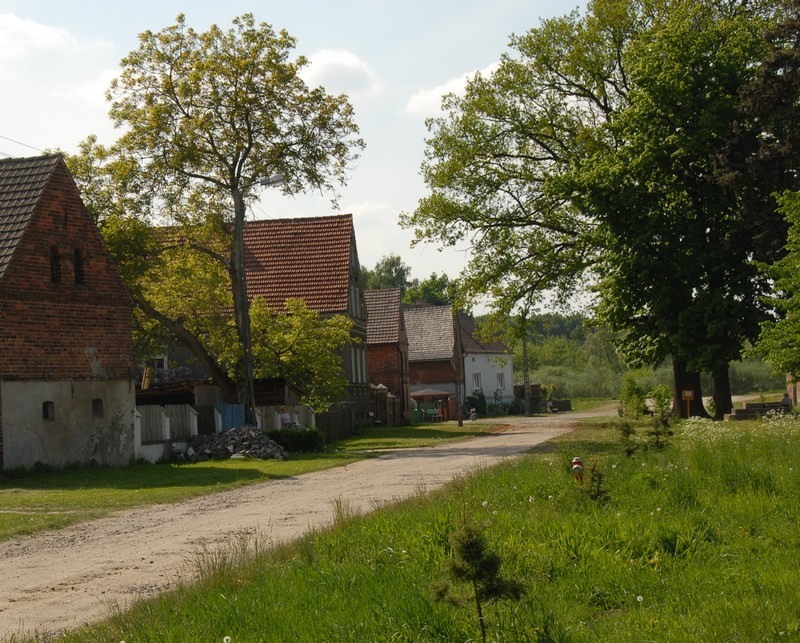

- Location within Poland
- Coordinates: 51°50′38″N 14°37′7″E
- Country: Poland
- Voivodeship: Lubusz
- County: Krosno
- Gmina: Gubin

Późna [ˈpuʑna] (German: Pohsen) is a village in the administrative district of Gmina Gubin, within Krosno County, Lubusz Voivodeship, in western Poland, close to the German border.
