= Żenichów =

- Village
- Location within Poland
- Coordinates: 51°56′13″N 14°45′05″E
- Country: Poland
- Voivodeship: Lubusz
- County: Krosno
- Gmina: Gubin
- Population (2011): 151

Żenichów ([ʐɛˈnixuf]; German: Schöneiche) is a village in the administrative district of Gmina Gubin, within Krosno County, Lubusz Voivodeship, in western Poland, close to the German border.
