= Kujawa, Lubusz Voivodeship =

Kujawa
- Village
- Location within Poland
- Coordinates: 51°54′N 14°47′E
- Country: Poland
- Voivodeship: Lubusz
- County: Krosno
- Gmina: Gubin
- Population: 80

Kujawa [kuˈjava] is a village in the administrative district of Gmina Gubin, within Krosno County, Lubusz Voivodeship, in western Poland, close to the German border.
