= Drzeńsk Mały =

- Village
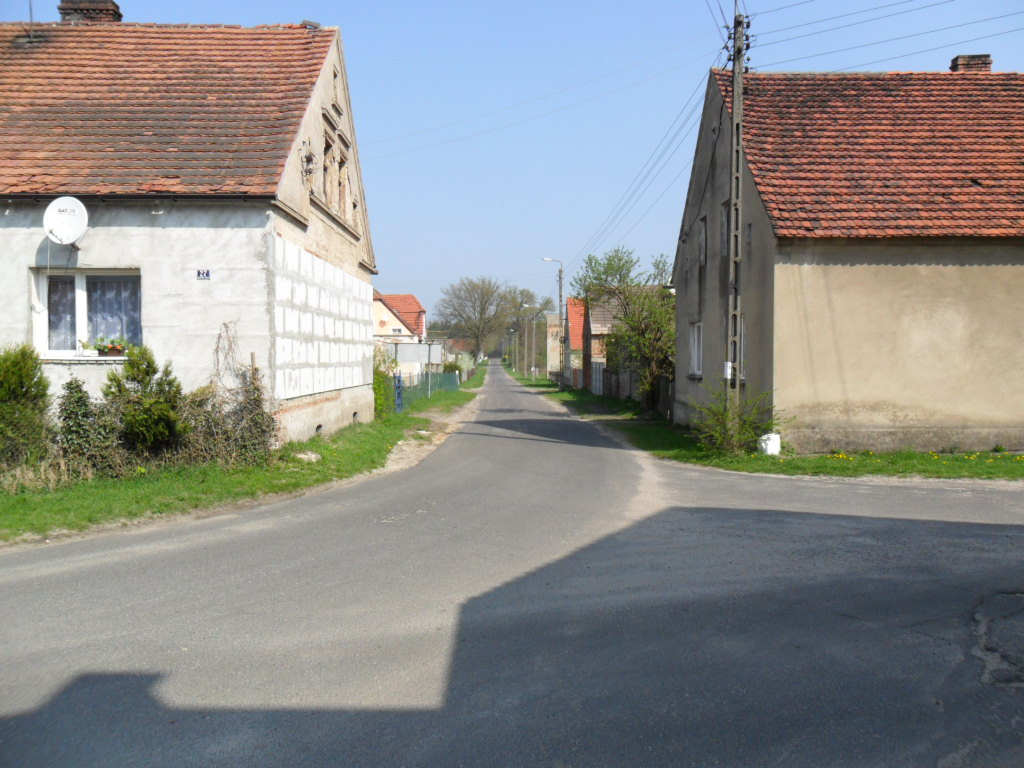

- Location within Poland
- Coordinates: 51°59′06″N 14°46′01″E
- Country: Poland
- Voivodeship: Lubusz
- County: Krosno
- Gmina: Gubin

Drzeńsk Mały (Polish pronunciation: [dʐɛj̃sk ˈmawɨ]; German: Klein Drenzig) is a village in the administrative district of Gmina Gubin, within Krosno County, Lubusz Voivodeship, in western Poland, close to the German border.
