= Grochów, Lubusz Voivodeship =

Grochów
- Village
- Location within Poland
- Coordinates: 51°55′N 14°56′E
- Country: Poland
- Voivodeship: Lubusz
- County: Krosno
- Gmina: Gubin

Grochów ([ˈɡrɔxuf]; German: Grocho) is a village in the administrative district of Gmina Gubin, within Krosno County, Lubusz Voivodeship, in western Poland, close to the German border.
