= Starosiedle =

- Village
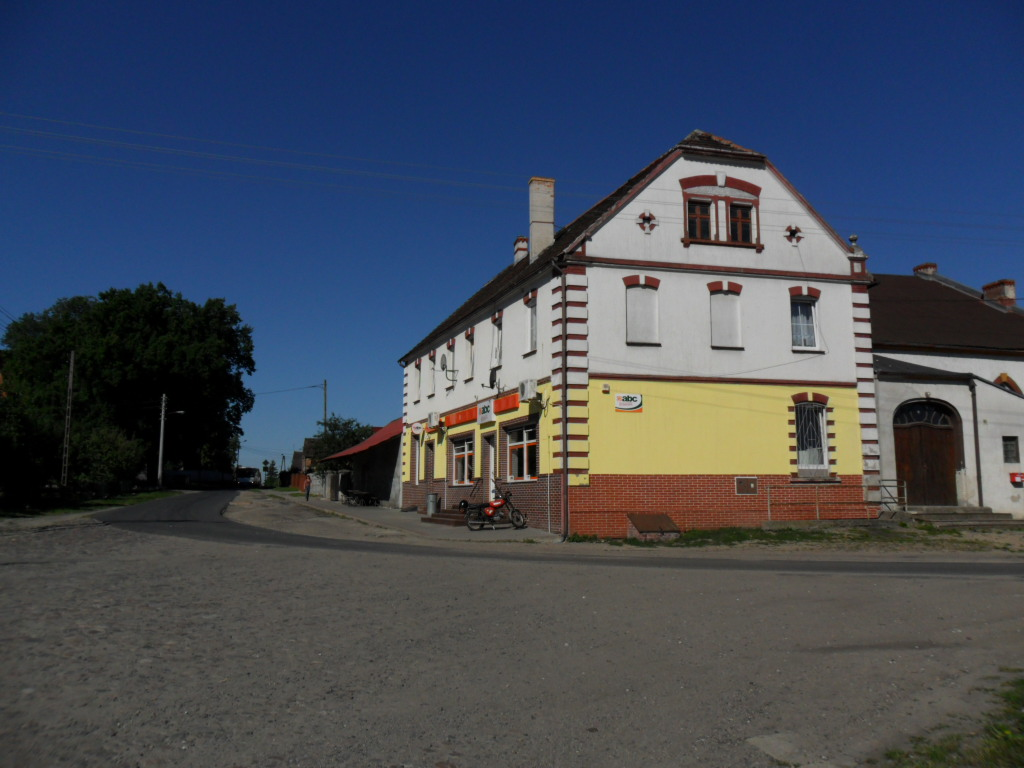

- Location within Poland
- Coordinates: 51°51′N 14°49′E
- Country: Poland
- Voivodeship: Lubusz
- County: Krosno
- Gmina: Gubin

Starosiedle ([starɔˈɕɛdlɛ]; German: Starzeddel; Lower Sorbian: Stare Sedło) is a village in the administrative district of Gmina Gubin, within Krosno County, Lubusz Voivodeship, in western Poland, close to the German border. It is located southeast of Gubin, about 15 kilometres (9.3 mi) from the German border.

== Notable residents ==
Paul Johannes Tillich (1886–1965), German-American theologian

== See also ==
Territorial changes of Poland after World War II
