= Grabice, Lubusz Voivodeship =

Grabice
- Village
- Location within Poland
- Coordinates: 51°51′59″N 14°41′58″E
- Country: Poland
- Voivodeship: Lubusz
- County: Krosno
- Gmina: Gubin

Grabice ([ɡraˈbit͡sɛ]; German: Reichersdorf; Lower Sorbian: Rychartojce) is a village in the administrative district of Gmina Gubin, within Krosno County, Lubusz Voivodeship, in western Poland, close to the German border.
