= Dobrzyń, Gmina Gubin =

Dobrzyń
- Village
- Location within Poland
- Coordinates: 51°55′N 14°47′E
- Country: Poland
- Voivodeship: Lubusz
- County: Krosno
- Gmina: Gubin

Dobrzyń ([ˈdɔbʐɨɲ]; German: Döbern) is a village in the administrative district of Gmina Gubin, within Krosno County, Lubusz Voivodeship, in western Poland, close to the German border.
