= Chęciny, Lubusz Voivodeship =

Chęciny
- Village
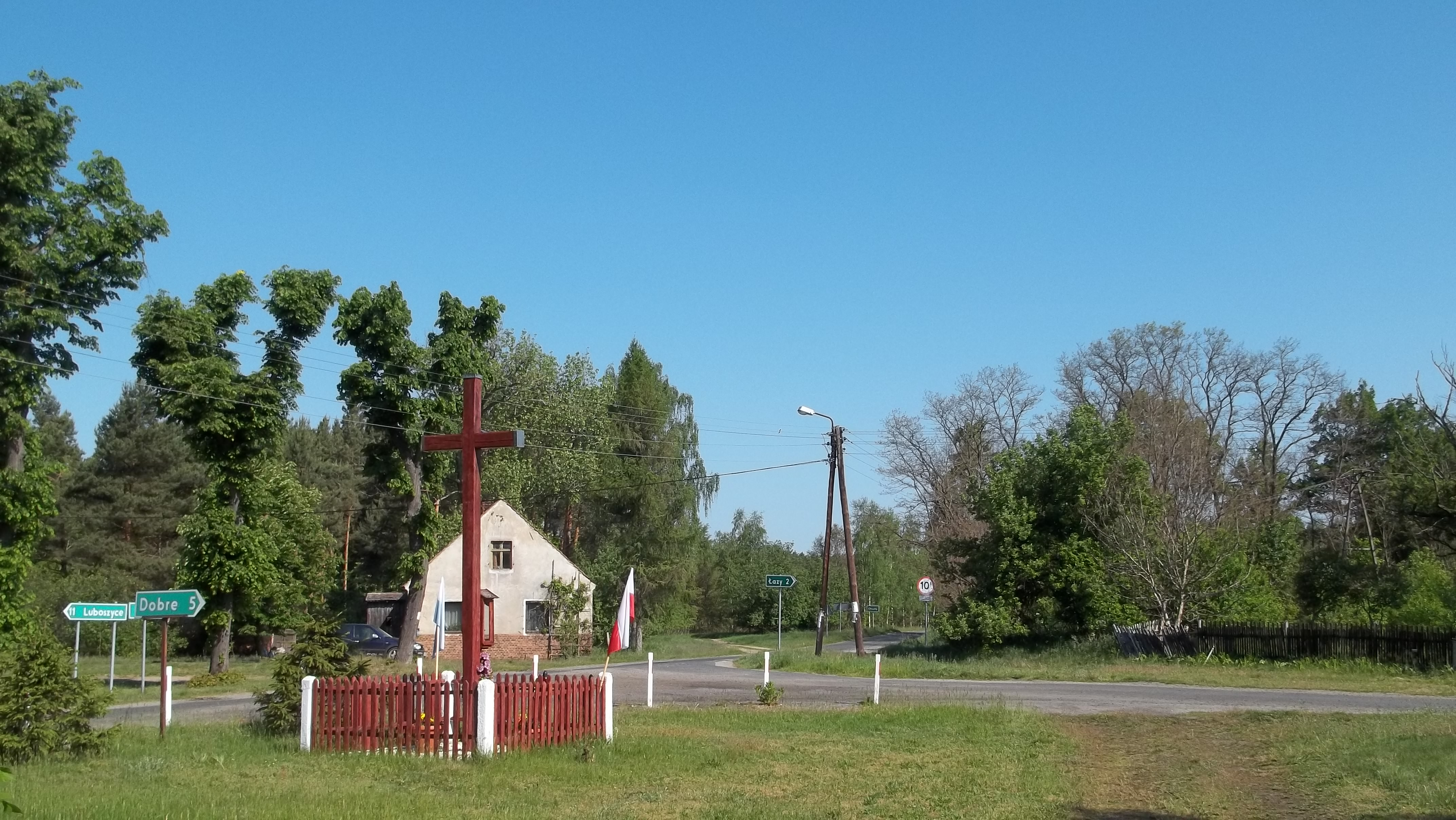

- Location within Poland
- Coordinates: 51°50′N 14°54′E
- Country: Poland
- Voivodeship: Lubusz
- County: Krosno
- Gmina: Gubin

Chęciny ([xɛnˈt͡ɕinɨ]; German: Sachsdorf) is a village in the administrative district of Gmina Gubin, within Krosno County, Lubusz Voivodeship, in western Poland, close to the German border.
