= Dobre, Lubusz Voivodeship =

Dobre
- Village
- Location within Poland
- Coordinates: 51°53′N 14°54′E
- Country: Poland
- Voivodeship: Lubusz
- County: Krosno
- Gmina: Gubin

Dobre ([ˈdɔbrɛ]; German: Dobern) is a village in the administrative district of Gmina Gubin, within Krosno County, Lubusz Voivodeship, in western Poland, close to the German border.
