= Kaniów, Lubusz Voivodeship =

Kaniów
- Village
- Location within Poland
- Coordinates: 51°55′N 14°55′E
- Country: Poland
- Voivodeship: Lubusz
- County: Krosno
- Gmina: Gubin

Kaniów ([ˈkaɲuf]; German: Kanig; Lower Sorbian: Kanjow) is a village in the administrative district of Gmina Gubin, within Krosno County, Lubusz Voivodeship, in western Poland, close to the German border.
