= Dobrin =

Dobrin may refer to:

- Dobrin (name)
- Dobříň, a village and municipality (obec) in Litoměřice District, Ústí nad Labem Region, Czech Republic
- Dobrin, Sălaj, commune in Sălaj County, Romania
- Dobrin, Bulgaria, a village in Dobrich Province, Bulgaria
  - The Dobrin Wind Farm, Dobrin, Dobrich Region, Bulgaria
- Dobrin, German name for a town in the Kuyavian-Pomeranian Voivodeship, Poland

== See also ==
- Dobrina (disambiguation)
- Dobrinj
- Dobrynia (disambiguation)
- Dobrynin (disambiguation)
- Dobrzyń (disambiguation)
- Dobre (disambiguation)
