= Gmina Gubin =

Gmina Gubin Gubin Commune
- Gmina
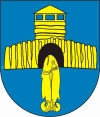
- Coat of arms
- Interactive map of Gmina Gubin
- Coordinates (Gubin): 51°56′56″N 14°43′44″E
- Country: Poland
- Voivodeship: Lubusz
- County: Krosno
- Seat: Gubin

Area
  - Total: 379.73 km^{2} (146.61 sq mi)

Population (2019-06-30)
  - Total: 7,156
  - Density: 18.84/km^{2} (48.81/sq mi)
- Website: http://www.gminagubin.pl

Gmina Gubin is a rural gmina (administrative district) in Krosno County, Lubusz Voivodeship, in western Poland, on the German border. Its seat is the town of Gubin, although the town is not part of the territory of the gmina.

The gmina covers an area of 379.73 square kilometres (146.6 sq mi), and as of 2019 its total population is 7,156.

The gmina contains part of the protected area called Krzesin Landscape Park.

== Villages ==
Gmina Gubin contains the villages and settlements of Bieżyce, Brzozów, Budoradz, Chęciny, Chlebowo, Chociejów, Czarnowice, Dobre, Dobrzyń, Drzeńsk Mały, Drzeńsk Wielki, Dzikowo, Gębice, Grabice, Grochów, Gubinek, Jaromirowice, Jazów, Kaniów, Komorów, Koperno, Kosarzyn, Kozów, Kujawa, Łazy, Łomy, Luboszyce, Markosice, Mielno, Nowa Wioska, Pleśno, Polanowice, Pole, Późna, Przyborowice, Sadzarzewice, Sękowice, Sieńsk, Stargard Gubiński, Starosiedle, Strzegów, Wałowice, Węgliny, Wielotów, Witaszkowo, Zawada, Żenichów and Żytowań.

== Neighbouring gminas ==
Gmina Gubin is bordered by the town of Gubin and by the gminas of Bobrowice, Brody, Cybinka, Krosno Odrzańskie, Lubsko and Maszewo. It also borders Germany.
