= Łomy, Lubusz Voivodeship =

Łomy
- Village
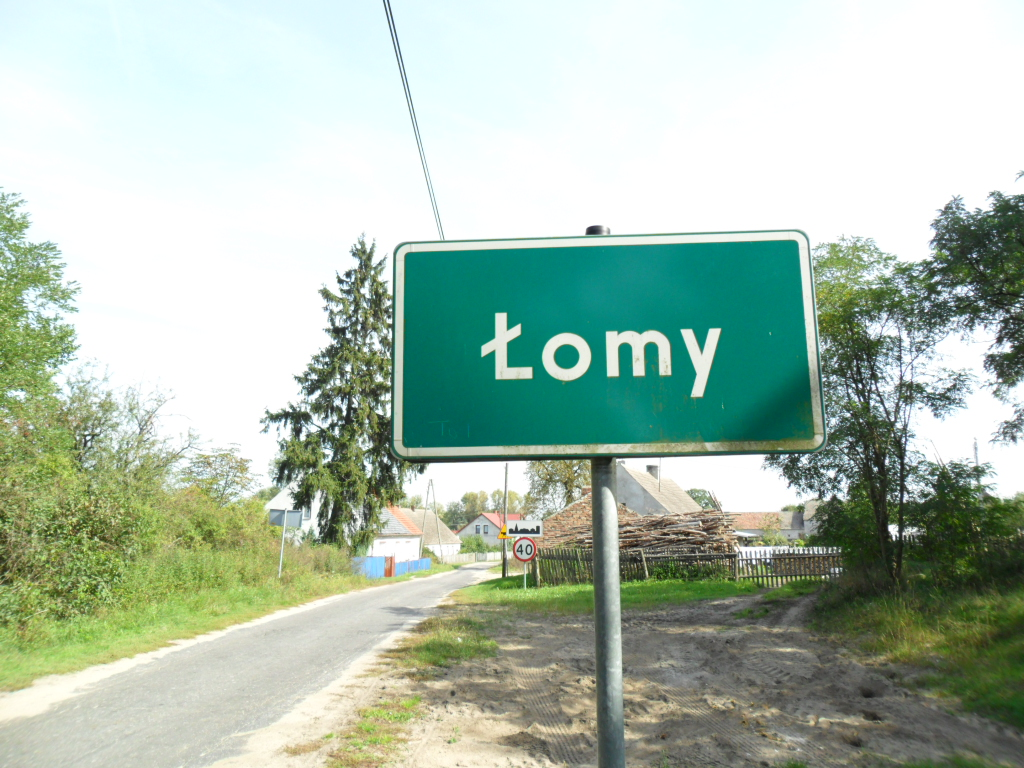

- Location within Poland
- Coordinates: 52°4′N 14°48′E
- Country: Poland
- Voivodeship: Lubusz
- County: Krosno
- Gmina: Gubin

Łomy ([ˈwɔmɨ]; German: Lahmo) is a village in the administrative district of Gmina Gubin, within Krosno County, Lubusz Voivodeship, in western Poland, close to the German border.
