= Dzikowo, Gmina Gubin =

Dzikowo
- Village
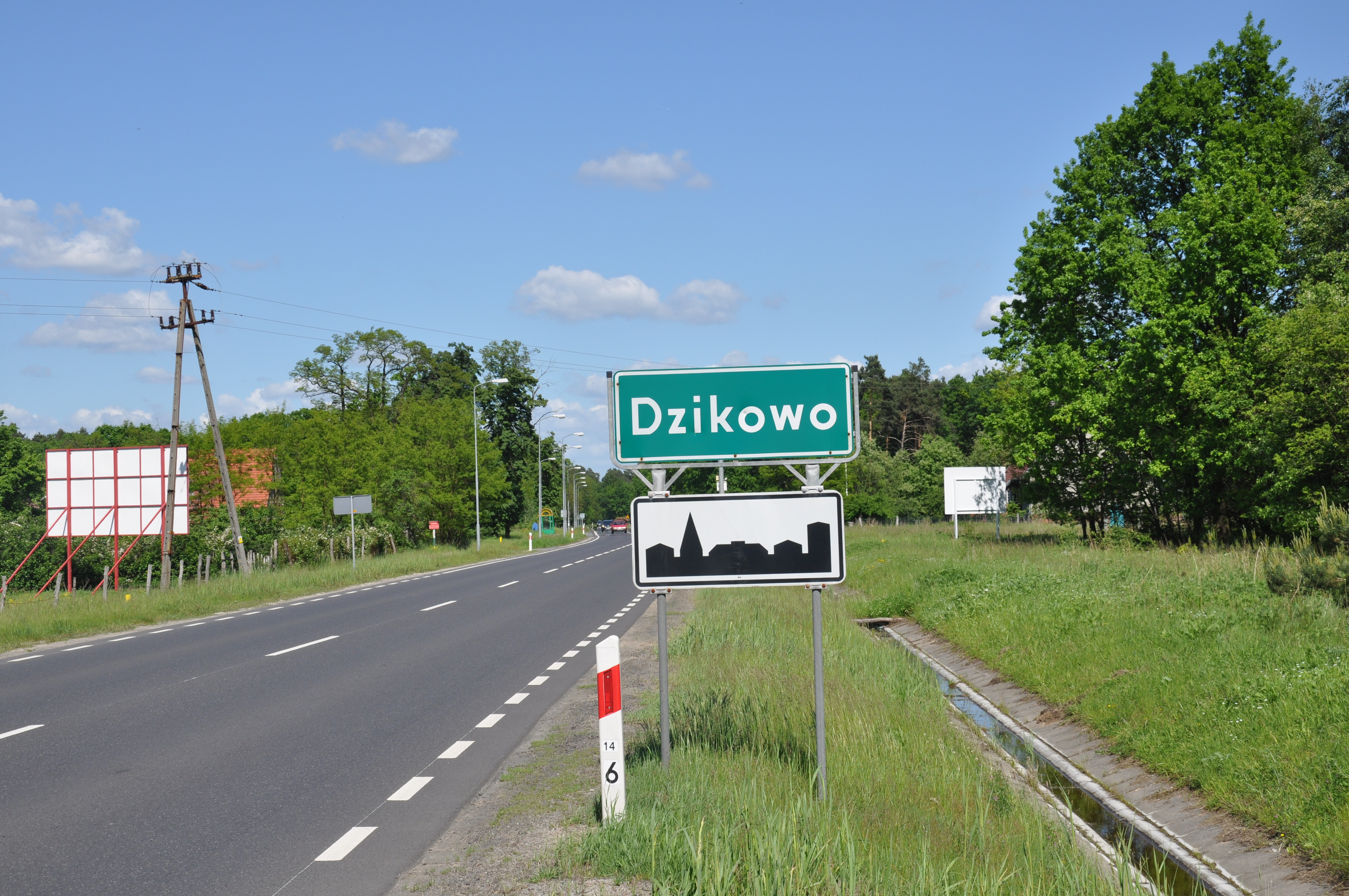

- Location within Poland
- Coordinates: 51°58′N 14°51′E
- Country: Poland
- Voivodeship: Lubusz
- County: Krosno
- Gmina: Gubin

Dzikowo [d͡ʑiˈkɔvɔ] is a village in the administrative district of Gmina Gubin, within Krosno County, Lubusz Voivodeship, in western Poland, close to the German border.
