= Dobrin Wind Farm =

Proposed wind farm in Bulgaria

Dobrich Wind Farm
- Country: Bulgaria
- Location: Dobrin
- Status: Proposed
- Owner: Balkan Energy

Power generation
- Units operational: 100
- Nameplate capacity: 200 MW

The Dobrin Wind Farm (Bulgarian: Вятърен парк Добрин) is a proposed wind power project in Dobrin, Dobrich Province, Bulgaria. It will have 100 individual wind turbines with a nominal output of around 2 MW which will deliver up to 200 MW of power, enough to power over 79,800 homes, with a capital investment required of approximately US$180 million.

== See also ==
- Kavarna Wind Farm
