= Dobrynia =

Dobrynia may refer to

- Dobrynya, Vladimir the Great's maternal uncle
- Dobrynia, Poland, village in Gmina Dębowiec, Jasło County, Subcarpathian Voivodeship

== See also ==
- Dobrin (disambiguation)
- Dobrina (disambiguation)
- Dobrynin (disambiguation)
