= Stargard Gubiński =

- Village
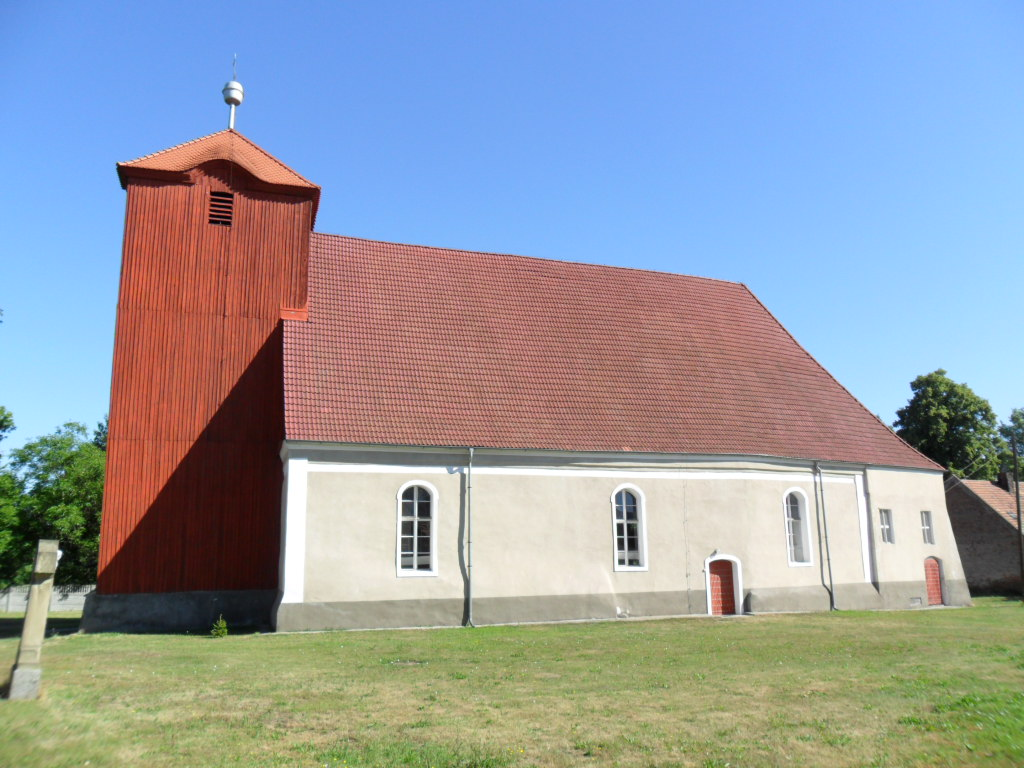
- Church of Saint Joseph

- Location within Poland
- Coordinates: 51°54′N 14°47′E
- Country: Poland
- Voivodeship: Lubusz
- County: Krosno
- Gmina: Gubin
- Time zone: UTC+1 (CET)
  - Summer (DST): UTC+2 (CEST)
- Vehicle registration: FKR

Stargard Gubiński ([ˈstarɡart ɡuˈbiɲski]; German: Stargardt; Lower Sorbian: Stary Grod) is a village in the administrative district of Gmina Gubin, within Krosno County, Lubusz Voivodeship, in western Poland, close to the German border.

== Etymology ==
The name Stargard stands for old town, old city, or old fortification. It's a combination of Slavic terms stari (old) and gard (town/city/fortification). The adjective Gubiński was added after the nearby town of Gubin, to distinguish it from other settlements of the same name.
