= Dobré, Ivory Coast =

Dobré
- Village
- Location in Ivory Coast
- Coordinates: 5°34′N 6°20′W
- Country: Ivory Coast
- District: Bas-Sassandra
- Region: Gbôklé
- Department: Sassandra
- Sub-prefecture: Grihiri
- Time zone: UTC+0 (GMT)

Dobré is a village in south-western Ivory Coast. It is in the sub-prefecture of Grihiri, Sassandra Department, Gbôklé Region, Bas-Sassandra District.

Dobré was a commune until March 2012, when it became one of 1,126 communes nationwide that were abolished.
