= Grihiri =

Town and sub-prefecture in Ivory Coast

- Town and sub-prefecture
- Location in Ivory Coast
- Coordinates: 5°25′N 6°21′W
- Country: Ivory Coast
- District: Bas-Sassandra
- Region: Gbôklé
- Department: Sassandra

Population (2014)
  - Total: 37,852
- Time zone: UTC+0 (GMT)

Grihiri is a town in south-western Ivory Coast. It is a sub-prefecture of Sassandra Department in Gbôklé Region, Bas-Sassandra District.

Grihiri was a commune until March 2012, when it became one of 1,126 communes nationwide that were abolished.

In 2014, the population of the sub-prefecture of Grihiri was 37,852.

== Villages ==
The six villages of the sub-prefecture of Grihiri and their population in 2014 are:

1. Boutoubré 1 (4,736)
2. Boutoubré 2 (5,558)
3. Grihiri (13,218)
4. Kouaté (5,760)
5. Louhiri (2,557)
6. Zahebre (6,023)
