= Dobrești, Dolj =

Dobrești
- Commune
- Location in Romania
- Coordinates: 43.9671°N 23.9486°E
- Country: Romania
- County: Dolj
- Area: 37.34 km^{2} (14.42 sq mi)
- Population (2021-12-01): 2,015
  - Density: 53.96/km^{2} (139.8/sq mi)
- Time zone: UTC+02:00 (EET)
  - Summer (DST): UTC+03:00 (EEST)
- Vehicle reg.: DJ

Dobrești is a commune in Dolj County, Oltenia, Romania with a population of 2,834 people. It is composed of five villages: Căciulătești, Dobrești, Georocel, Murta and Toceni.
