= Negureni =

- Commune
- Location within Moldova
- Coordinates: 47.6011111111°N 28.51°E
- Country: Moldova
- District: Telenești District

Population (2014)
  - Total: 2,588
- Time zone: UTC+2 (EET)
  - Summer (DST): UTC+3 (EEST)

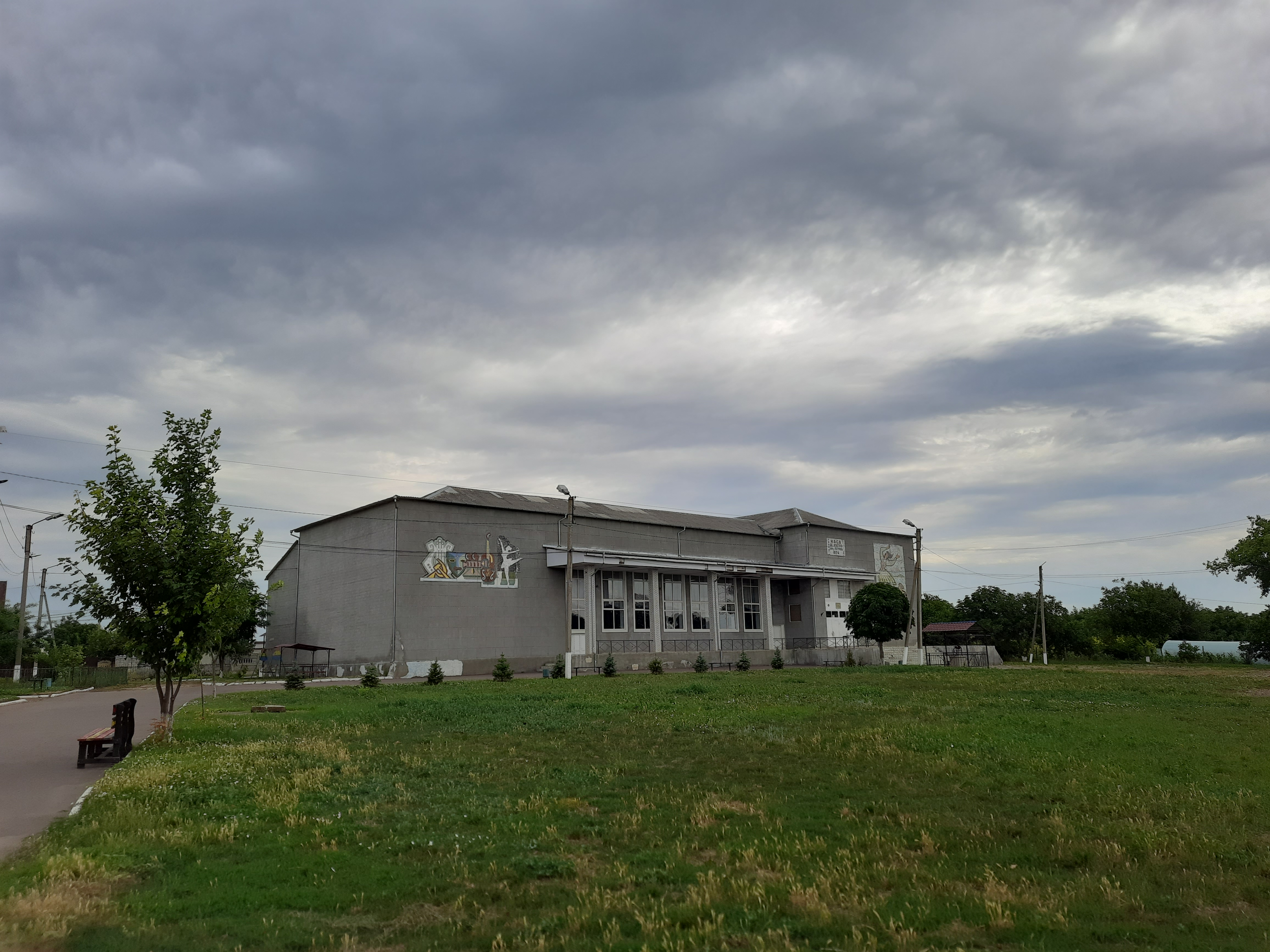

Negureni is a commune in Telenești District, Moldova. It is composed of three villages: Chersac, Dobrușa and Negureni.
