= Dobrynin (surname) =

Dobrynin (Russian: Добрынин) is a Russian masculine surname, its feminine counterpart is Dobrynina. It may refer to

- Anatoly Dobrynin (1919–2010), Russian statesman
- Nikolai Dobrynin (born 1963), Russian actor
- Nikita Pustosviat (real name Nikita Konstantinovich Dobrynin, died 1683), leader of the Russian Old Believers
- Vyacheslav Dobrynin (1946–2024), Russian composer and singer
- Konstantin Dobrynin (born 1976), Russian lawyer and statesman
