= Dobrina, Šentjur =

Dobrina
- Location in Slovenia
- Coordinates: 46°9′1.39″N 15°29′9.56″E
- Country: Slovenia
- Traditional region: Styria
- Statistical region: Savinja
- Municipality: Šentjur

Area
  - Total: 4.43 km^{2} (1.71 sq mi)
- Elevation: 525.2 m (1,723 ft)

Population (2020)
  - Total: 194
  - Density: 43.8/km^{2} (113/sq mi)

Dobrina (pronounced [dɔˈbɾiːna]) is a settlement in the Municipality of Šentjur, in eastern Slovenia. The settlement, and the entire municipality, are included in the Savinja Statistical Region, which is in the Slovenian portion of the historical Duchy of Styria. Dobrina includes the hamlets of Brode, Drenovc, Glažuta, Hrastje, Svetilka, and Žusem.

== Name ==
Dobrina was first mentioned in written sources circa 1480 as Dobring, Dobryn, and Dobrin. The name is derived from the shortened personal name *Dobrъ and thus literally means 'Dobrъ's village'. The personal name *Dobrъ is based on the Slavic adjective *dobrъ 'good'.

The hamlet of Žusem was first attested in 1202 as Sůzzenheim (and as Sůzzenhaim in 1208). The Slovene name is derived from Middle High German, which also yielded the 19th-century German name Süssenheim. The name is a compound of Middle High German süze 'sweet' + heim 'house, dwelling, home'.

== History ==
Until the Second World War, the hamlet of Žusem was an independent settlement. Together with Žusem Castle (German: Süssenheim), it was a fief of Krško. It belonged to the Lords of Süssenheim from 1203 to 1478, with short periods of ownership by the Counts of Celje. After this it was the property of the imperial governors; Leopold Fieglmüller had the castle razed in 1876.

== Churches ==
The local parish church, built on a hill south of Žusem Castle, a 12th-century castle abandoned in 1871, is known as Žusem Parish. It is dedicated to Saint Valentine and belongs to the Roman Catholic Diocese of Celje. It was built in the early 18th century on the site of a 16th-century predecessor. The belfry dates to 1894. Right next to it is a second church, dedicated to Saint James (Slovene: sveti Jakob). It is a mid-15th-century Gothic building with a 17th-century belfry.
