= Gubino, Orekhovo-Zuyevsky District, Moscow Oblast =

Rural locality in Moscow Oblast, Russia

Coordinates: 55°41.95′N 39°6.5′E

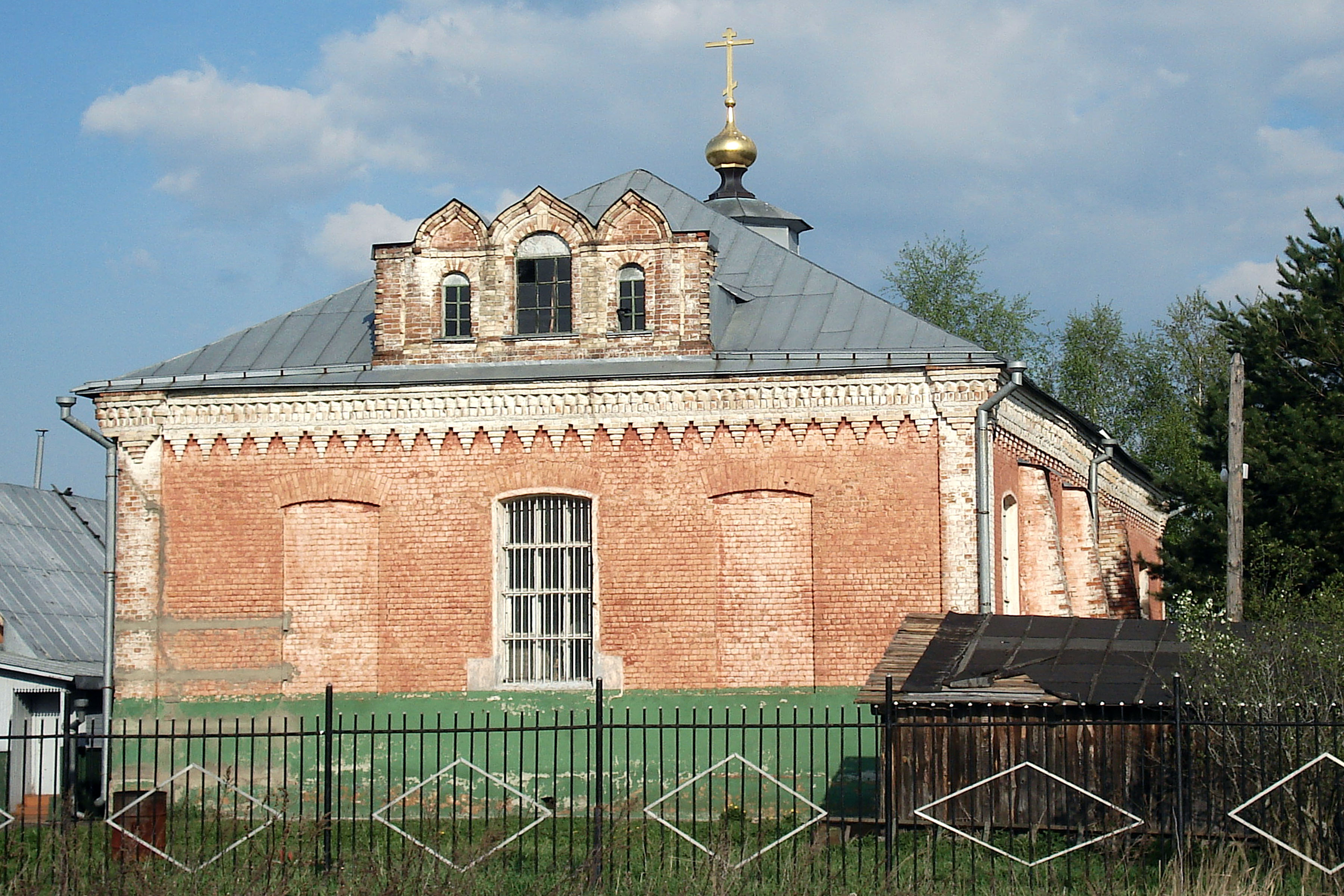
Old Believers' Our Lady of Kazan church in Gubino

Gubino (Russian: Гу́бино) is a rural locality (a village) in Orekhovo-Zuyevsky District of Moscow Oblast, Russia, located some 80 kilometers (50 mi) east of Moscow. In the 19th century, it was named Gubinskaya (Гу́бинская).

Municipally, the village is a part of Belavinskoye Rural Settlement (the administrative center of which is the village of Savinskaya). Population: 583 (1997). Postal code: 142635.

== History ==
The village is located in the historical area of Patriarshina. In the end of the 18th century, the village was a property of land estate owner Nikolay Danilovich Kozlov. In the 19th century, it was a part of Kudykinskaya Volost of Pokrovsky Uyezd of Vladimir Governorate. The overwhelming majority of the population of Gubino were Old Believers, who from the end of the 19th century were guided by the Russian Orthodox Old-Rite Church.

In 1925, there was a steam-powered gristmill, a paper and textile factory, and other textile facilities.

== Population ==
In 1859, the village consisted of 133 homesteads comprising 989 inhabitants (486 male and 503 female). In 1905, the population rose to 286 homesteads comprising 1,508 people. By 1913, the population further increased to 2,451. In 1925, there were 408 homesteads comprising 2,226 inhabitants. As of January 1, 1997, the population is 583.
