= Dobrin (name) =

Dobrin is both a surname and a given name. Notable people with the name include:

Surname:

- Neta Dobrin (born 1975), Israeli politician
- Nicolae Dobrin, Romanian footballer
- Sergei Dobrin, Russian figure skater
- Tory Dobrin, American artistic director

Given name:

- Dobrin Orlovski (born 1981), Bulgarian football defender
