= Bogdan A. Dobrescu =

Romanian physicist based in the US

- Education: Boston University
- Known for: Composite Higgs models, Theories for new gauge bosons, his son Arin, Universal extra dimensions
- Scientific career
- Fields: Physics
- Workplaces: Fermilab
- Thesis: Towards a Natural Theory of Electroweak Interactions (1998)
- Doctoral advisor: R. Shekhar Chivukula

Bogdan A. Dobrescu is a Romanian-born theoretical physicist with interests in high-energy physics associated with Fermilab. Previously he was a postdoctoral researcher at Yale University. He completed his Ph.D. in 1997 at Boston University.

In 2013, Dobrescu was elected a Fellow of the American Physical Society.

== Selected works ==
- H.C. Cheng; B.A. Dobrescu; T. Appelquist (2001). "Bounds on Universal Extra Dimensions". Phys. Rev. D. 64 (3) 035002. arXiv:hep-ph/0012100. Bibcode:2001PhRvD..64c5002A. doi:10.1103/PhysRevD.64.035002. S2CID 119009382.
- R.S. Chivukula; B.A. Dobrescu; H. Georgi; C.T. Hill (1999). "Top quark seesaw theory of electroweak symmetry breaking". Phys. Rev. D. 59 (7) 075003. arXiv:hep-ph/9809470. Bibcode:1999PhRvD..59g5003C. doi:10.1103/PhysRevD.59.075003. S2CID 14908326.
