= Dobre =

Dobre or Dobré may refer to:

== Places ==
=== Czech Republic ===
- Dobré, Czech Republic, a municipality and village in the Hradec Králové Region

=== Ivory Coast ===
- Dobré, Ivory Coast, a village

=== Poland ===
- Dobre, Radziejów County in Kuyavian-Pomeranian Voivodeship (north-central Poland)
- Dobre, Rypin County in Kuyavian-Pomeranian Voivodeship (north-central Poland)
- Dobre, Lublin Voivodeship (east Poland)
- Dobre, Masovian Voivodeship (east-central Poland)
- Dobre, Lubusz Voivodeship (west Poland)
- Dobre, West Pomeranian Voivodeship (north-west Poland)

== People ==
Dobre is a common family name in Romania:

- Aurelia Dobre, gymnast
- Cornel Dobre, footballer
- Dănuț Dobre, rower
- Estera Dobre, wrestler
- Gabriel Dobre, futsal player
- Leonard Dobre, footballer
- Lucian Dobre, footballer
- Octavia Dobre, professor
- Lucas and Marcus, both have the last name Dobre

== See also ==
- Dobra (disambiguation)
