= Krosno County, Lubusz Voivodeship =

Krosno County Powiat krośnieński
- County
- Flag Coat of arms

- Location within the voivodeship
- Coordinates (Krosno Odrzańskie): 52°2′N 15°6′E
- Country: Poland
- Voivodeship: Lubusz
- Seat: Krosno Odrzańskie
- Gminas: Total 7 (incl. 1 urban): Gubin; Gmina Bobrowice; Gmina Bytnica; Gmina Dąbie; Gmina Gubin; Gmina Krosno Odrzańskie; Gmina Maszewo

Area
  - Total: 1,390 km^{2} (540 sq mi)

Population (2019-06-30)
  - Total: 55,018
  - Density: 39.6/km^{2} (103/sq mi)
  - Urban: 27,938
  - Rural: 27,080
- Car plates: FKR

Krosno County (Polish: powiat krośnieński) is a unit of territorial administration and local government (powiat) in Lubusz Voivodeship, western Poland, on the German border. It came into being on 1 January 1999 as a result of the Polish local government reforms passed in 1998. Its administrative seat is the town of Krosno Odrzańskie, which lies 30 km (19 mi) west of Zielona Góra and 79 km (49 mi) south of Gorzów Wielkopolski. The only other town is Gubin which is the biggest town in the county. It is situated on the German border 28 km (17 mi) west of Krosno Odrzańskie.

The county covers an area of 1,390 square kilometres (536.7 sq mi). As of 2019 its total population is 55,018, out of which the population of Gubin is 16,619, that of Krosno Odrzańskie is 11,319, and the rural population is 27,080.

== Neighbouring counties ==
Krosno County is bordered by Słubice County to the north-west, Sulęcin County to the north, Świebodzin County to the north-east, Zielona Góra County to the east and Żary County to the south. It also borders Brandenburg in Germany to the west.

== Administrative divisions ==
The county is subdivided into seven gminas (one urban, one urban-rural and five rural). These are listed in the following table, in descending order of population.

Gmina	Type	Area (km^{2})	Population (2019)	Seat
Gmina Krosno Odrzańskie	urban-rural	211.5	17,784	Krosno Odrzańskie
Gubin	urban	20.7	16,619	
Gmina Gubin	rural	379.7	7,156	Gubin*
Gmina Dąbie	rural	170.0	4,930	Dąbie
Gmina Bobrowice	rural	185.1	3,205	Bobrowice
Gmina Maszewo	rural	213.6	2,812	Maszewo
Gmina Bytnica	rural	208.7	2,512	Bytnica
* seat not part of the gmina
