= Chojnica =

Chojnica may refer to the following villages in Poland:

- Chojnica, Greater Poland Voivodeship
- Chojnica, Warmian-Masurian Voivodeship
- Chojnica, Choszczno County, West Pomeranian Voivodeship
- Chojnica, Wałcz County, West Pomeranian Voivodeship
