= Barłogi =

Barłogi may refer to the following places:

- Barłogi, Konin County in Greater Poland Voivodeship (west-central Poland)
- Barłogi, Kuyavian-Pomeranian Voivodeship (north-central Poland)
- Barłogi, Lublin Voivodeship (east Poland)
- Barłogi, Koło County in Greater Poland Voivodeship (west-central Poland)
- Barłogi, Lubusz Voivodeship (west Poland)
