= Chojnowo =

Chojnowo may refer to the following places:

- Chojnowo, Maków County in Masovian Voivodeship (east-central Poland)
- Chojnowo, Grajewo County in Podlaskie Voivodeship (north-east Poland)
- Chojnowo, Mońki County in Podlaskie Voivodeship (north-east Poland)
- Chojnowo, Przasnysz County in Masovian Voivodeship (east-central Poland)
- Chojnowo, Żuromin County in Masovian Voivodeship (east-central Poland)
- Chojnowo, Lubusz Voivodeship (west Poland)
- Chojnowo, Warmian-Masurian Voivodeship (north Poland)
- Chojnowo, an alternative name for Chojnica, Choszczno County, West Pomeranian Voivodeship
