= Bylice =

Bylice may refer to the following places:

- Bylice, Greater Poland Voivodeship (west-central Poland)
- Bylice, Masovian Voivodeship (east-central Poland)
- Bylice, West Pomeranian Voivodeship (north-west Poland)
