= Boguszyniec =

Boguszyniec refers to the following places in Poland:

- Boguszyniec, Greater Poland Voivodeship
- Boguszyniec, Lubusz Voivodeship
