= Grodna =

Grodna can refer to

- Grodno, a city in Belarus
- Grodna (Blake) the mythological character from the writings of William Blake
- Grodna, Greater Poland Voivodeship (west-central Poland)
