= Chromów =

- Village
- Location within Poland
- Coordinates: 51°58′55″N 15°05′25″E
- Country: Poland
- Voivodeship: Lubusz
- County: Krosno
- Gmina: Bobrowice
- Population: 105 (year 2,015)

Chromów ([ˈxrɔmuf]; German: Chrumow) is a village in the administrative district of Gmina Bobrowice, within Krosno County, Lubusz Voivodeship, in western Poland.
