= Wełmice =

- Village
- Location within Poland
- Coordinates: 51°54′N 14°58′E
- Country: Poland
- Voivodeship: Lubusz
- County: Krosno
- Gmina: Bobrowice
- Population: 243

Wełmice ([vɛu̯ˈmit͡sɛ]; German: Wellmitz) is a village in the administrative district of Gmina Bobrowice, within Krosno County, Lubusz Voivodeship, in western Poland.
