= Kukadło =

- Village
- Location within Poland
- Coordinates: 51°56′N 15°7′E
- Country: Poland
- Voivodeship: Lubusz
- County: Krosno
- Gmina: Bobrowice
- Population: 46

Kukadło ([kuˈkadwɔ]; German: Kuckädel) is a village in the administrative district of Gmina Bobrowice, within Krosno County, Lubusz Voivodeship, in western Poland.

== Notable residents ==
- Georg Wenzeslaus von Knobelsdorff (1699–1753), Prussian painter and architect
