= Czeklin =

- Village
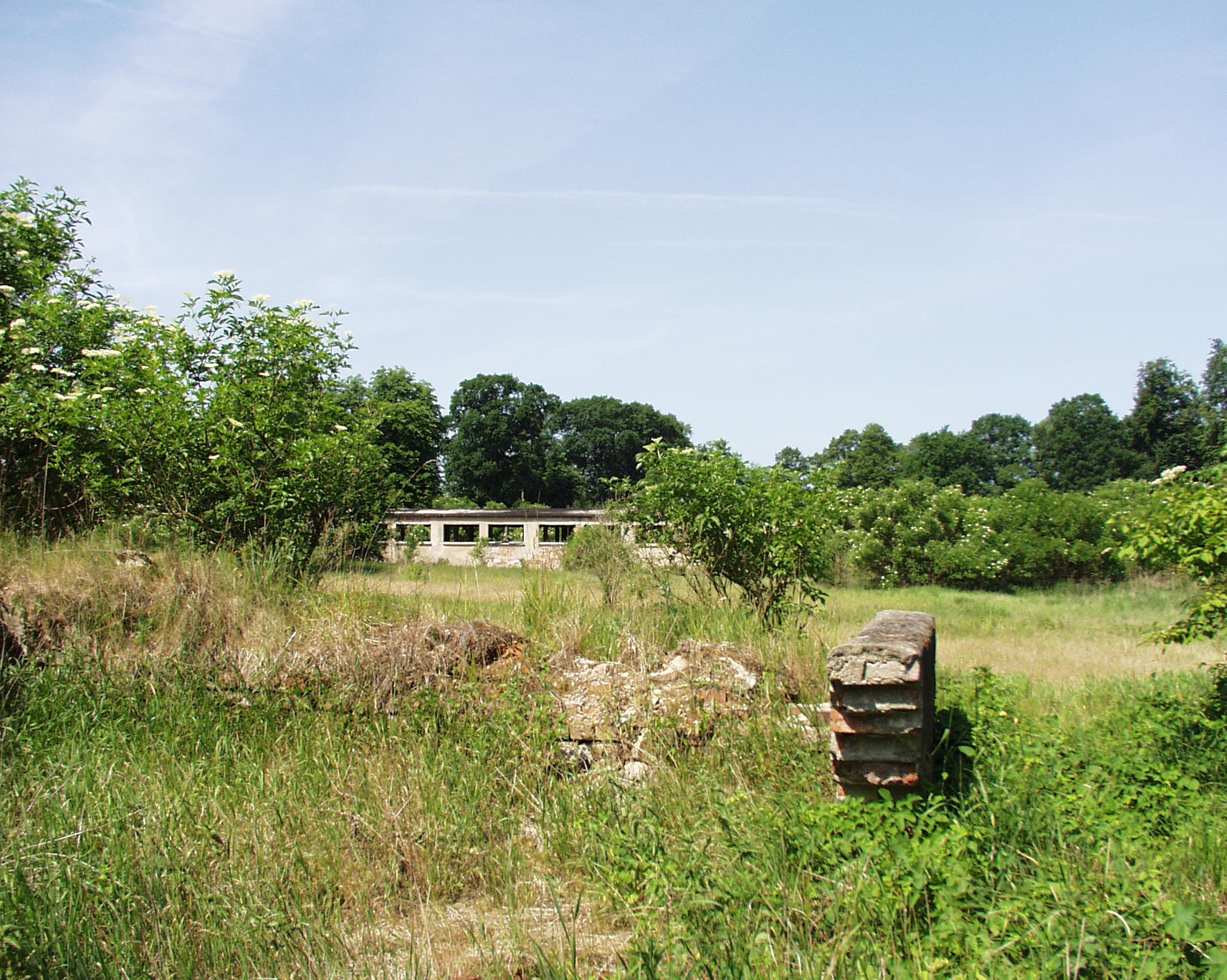

- Location within Poland
- Coordinates: 51°57′N 14°57′E
- Country: Poland
- Voivodeship: Lubusz
- County: Krosno
- Gmina: Bobrowice
- Population: 1

Czeklin ([ˈt͡ʂɛklin]; German: Schegeln) is a former village in the administrative district of Gmina Bobrowice, within Krosno County, Lubusz Voivodeship, in western Poland.
