= Borysławice Zamkowe =

- Village
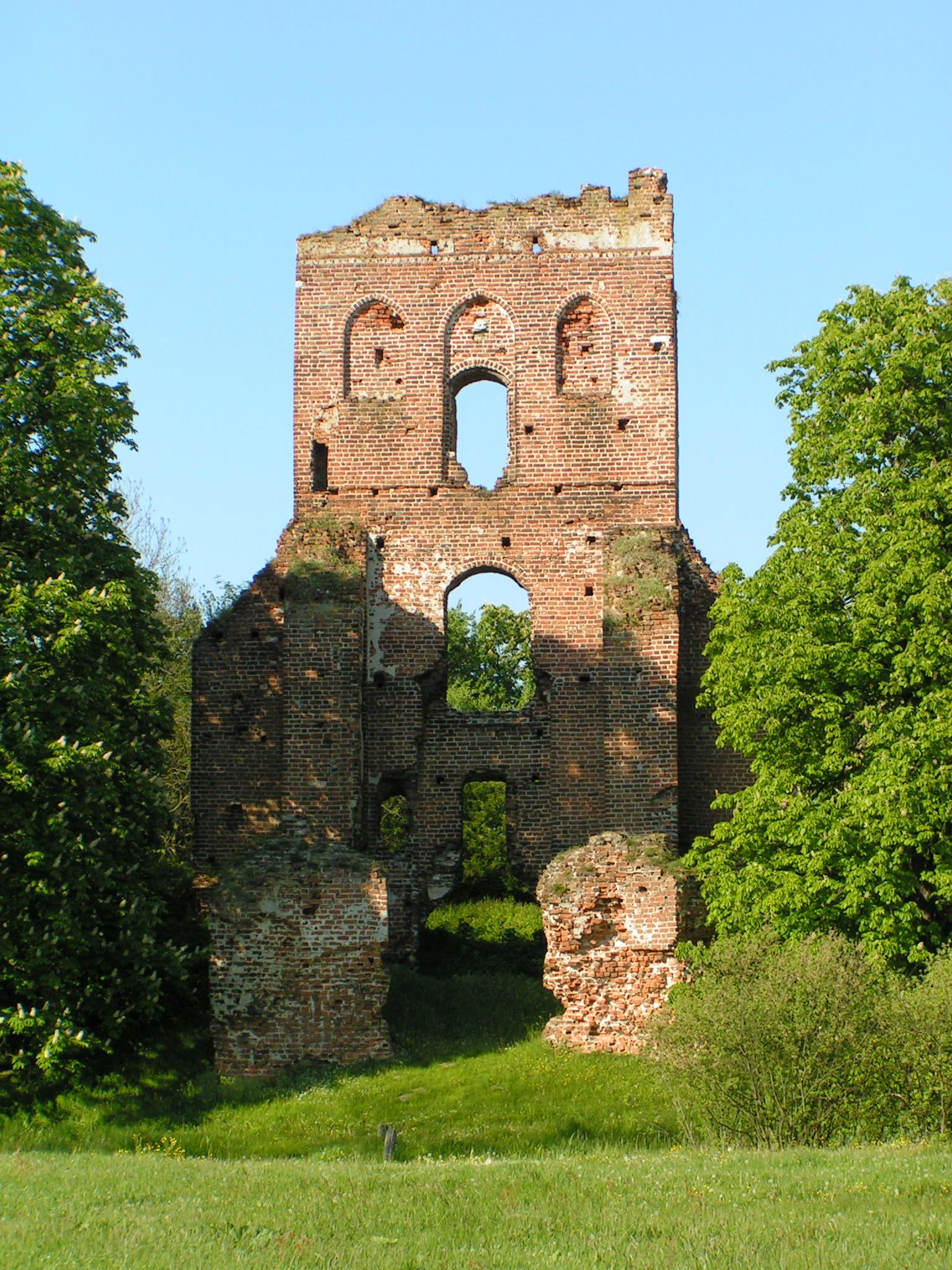
- Ruins of the medieval castle

- Location within Poland
- Coordinates: 52°14′N 18°48′E
- Country: Poland
- Voivodeship: Greater Poland
- County: Koło
- Gmina: Grzegorzew
- Time zone: UTC+1 (CET)
  - Summer (DST): UTC+2 (CEST)
- Postal code: 62-640
- Vehicle registration: PKL

Borysławice Zamkowe [bɔrɨswaˈvit͡sɛ zamˈkɔvɛ] is a village in the administrative district of Gmina Grzegorzew, within Koło County, Greater Poland Voivodeship, in central Poland.
