= Gmina Grzegorzew =

Gmina Grzegorzew Grzegorzew Commune
- Gmina
- Coat of arms

- Coordinates (Grzegorzew): 52°10′N 18°42′E
- Country: Poland
- Voivodeship: Greater Poland
- County: Koło
- Seat: Grzegorzew

Area
  - Total: 73.43 km^{2} (28.35 sq mi)

Population (2006)
  - Total: 5,617
  - Density: 76.49/km^{2} (198.1/sq mi)
- Time zone: UTC+1 (CET)
  - Summer (DST): UTC+2 (CEST)
- Vehicle registration: PKL
- Website: http://www.grzegorzew.nowoczesnagmina.pl/

Gmina Grzegorzew is a rural gmina (administrative district) in Koło County, Greater Poland Voivodeship, in central Poland. Its seat is the village of Grzegorzew, which lies approximately 6 kilometres (4 mi) south-east of Koło and 125 km (78 mi) east of the regional capital Poznań.

The gmina covers an area of 73.43 square kilometres (28.4 sq mi), and as of 2006 its total population is 5,617.

== Villages ==
Gmina Grzegorzew contains the villages and settlements of Barłogi, Boguszyniec, Borysławice Kościelne, Borysławice Zamkowe, Bylice, Bylice-Kolonia, Grodna, Grzegorzew, Kiełczewek, Ladorudzek, Ponętów Dolny, Tarnówka and Zabłocie.

== Neighbouring gminas ==
Gmina Grzegorzew is bordered by the gminas of Babiak, Dąbie, Kłodawa, Koło and Olszówka.
