= Kiełczewek =

- Village
- Location within Poland
- Coordinates: 52°14′N 18°44′E
- Country: Poland
- Voivodeship: Greater Poland
- County: Koło
- Gmina: Grzegorzew
- Time zone: UTC+1 (CET)
  - Summer (DST): UTC+2 (CEST)
- Vehicle registration: PKL

Kiełczewek [kʲɛu̯ˈt͡ʂɛvɛk] is a village in the administrative district of Gmina Grzegorzew, within Koło County, Greater Poland Voivodeship, in central Poland.
