= Bobrowice, Gmina Bobrowice =

Bobrowice
- Village
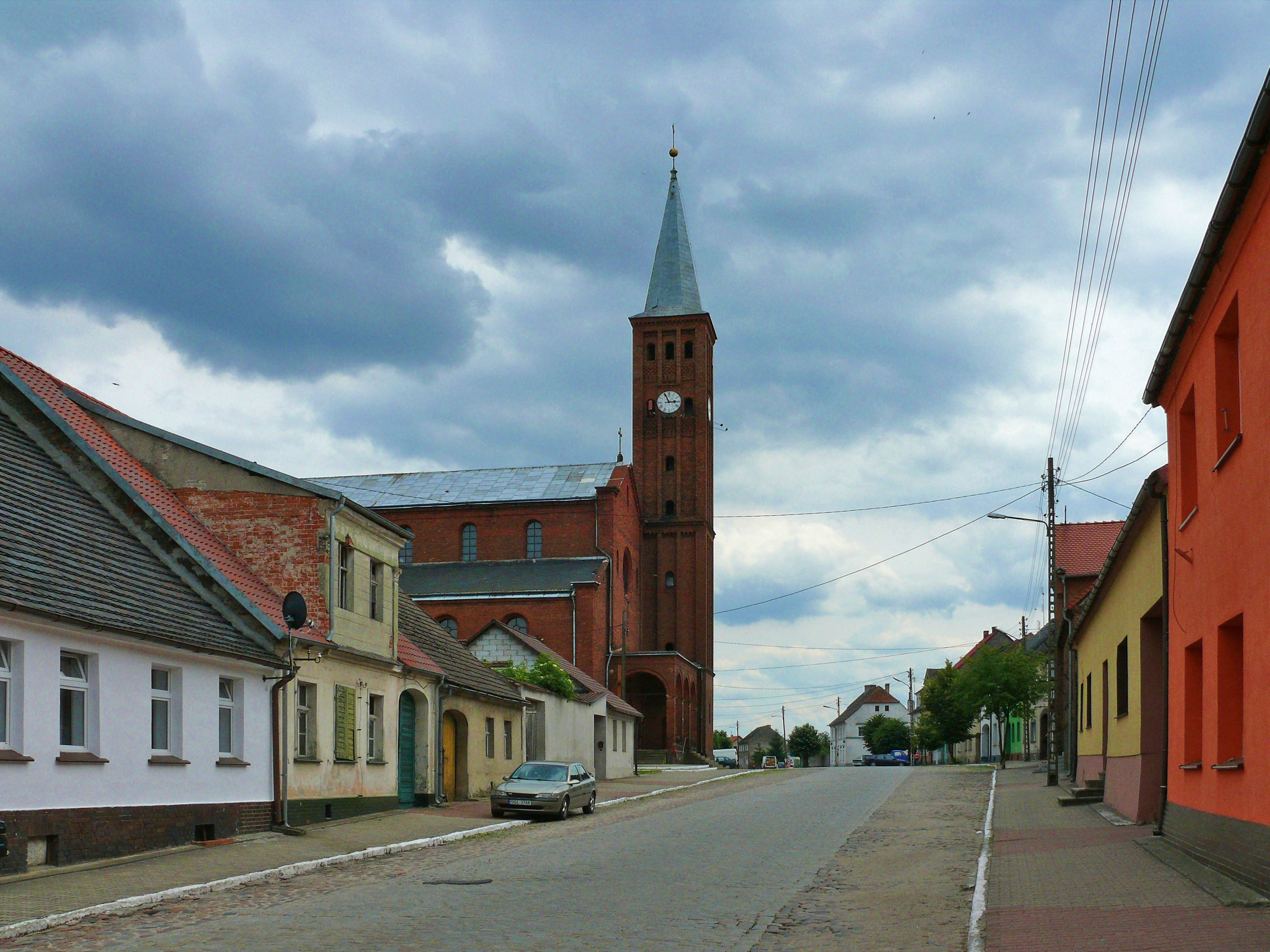
- Main street with parish church

- Coat of arms

- Location within Poland
- Coordinates: 51°57′13″N 15°5′5″E
- Country: Poland
- Voivodeship: Lubusz
- County: Krosno
- Gmina: Bobrowice
- Elevation: 65 m (213 ft)
- Population: 884

Bobrowice ([bɔbrɔˈvit͡sɛ]; German: Bobersberg) is a village in Krosno County, in Lubusz Voivodeship, western Poland. It is the seat of the gmina (administrative district) called Gmina Bobrowice.

== History ==
Together with the neighbouring town of Krosno, the area of Bobrowice from the 12th century on was part of the Duchy of Silesia, located near the western border with the Imperial March of Lusatia (later Lower Lusatia).

Part of the Silesian Duchy of Głogów under the Piast duke Konrad I from 1251 on, the settlement in 1476 belonged to the inheritance of Barbara of Brandenburg, widow of the last Głogów duke Henry XI, and therefore claimed by her father Elector Albert Achilles of Brandenburg. The acquisition was officially acknowledged by Ferdinand I of Habsburg in his capacity as Bohemian king in 1538, whereafter Bobrowice was incorporated into the Neumark district of Brandenburg.

== Notable residents ==
- Helmut Adam (1916–1942) Nazi German army officer
