= Przychów =

- Village
- Location within Poland
- Coordinates: 51°55′N 14°59′E
- Country: Poland
- Voivodeship: Lubusz
- County: Krosno
- Gmina: Bobrowice
- Population: 115

Przychów ([ˈpʂɨxuf]; German: Preichow) is a village in the administrative district of Gmina Bobrowice, within Krosno County, Lubusz Voivodeship, in western Poland.
