= Dychów =

- Village
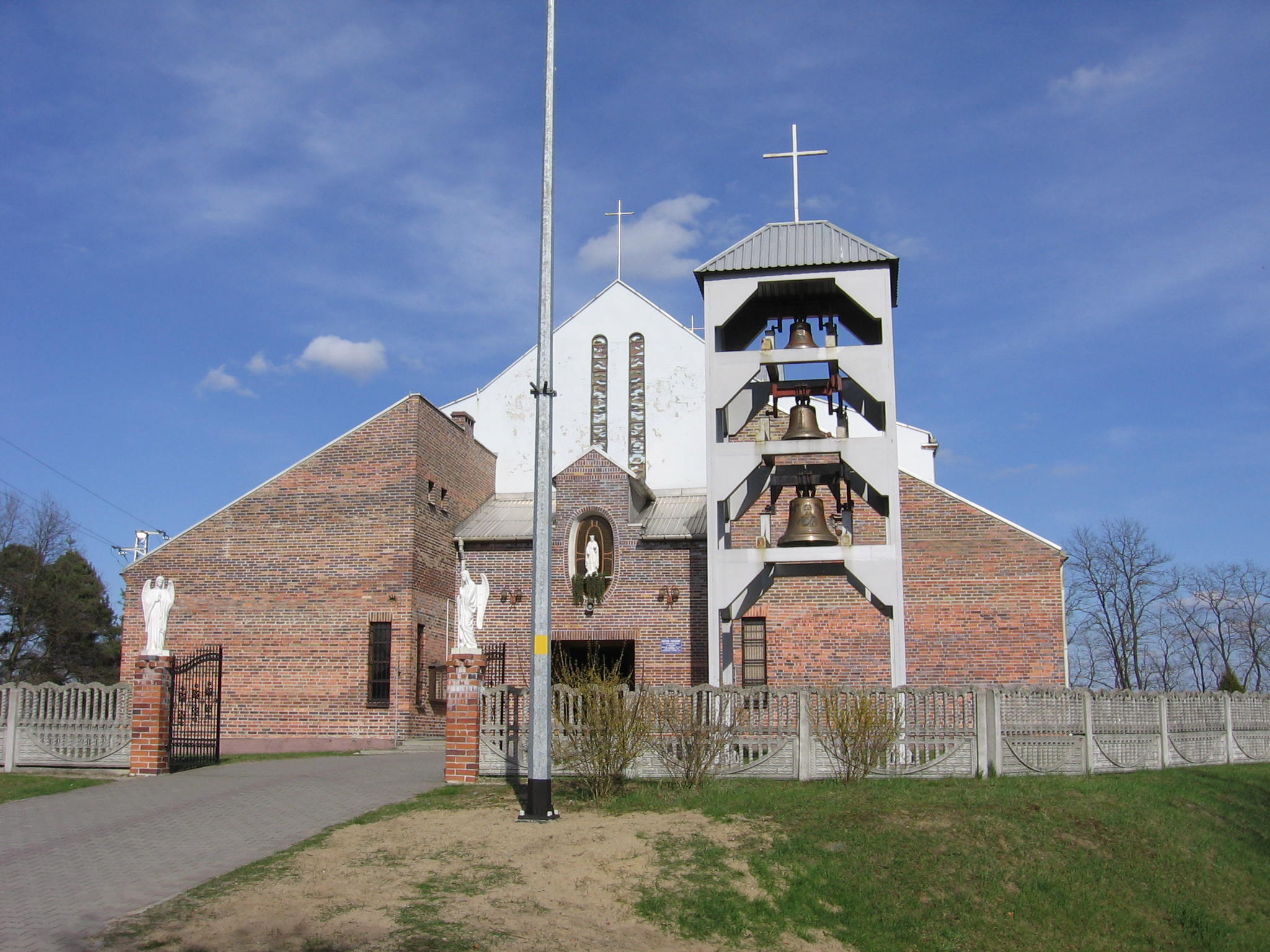
- Catholic church

- Location within Poland
- Coordinates: 51°59′1″N 15°3′32″E
- Country: Poland
- Voivodeship: Lubusz
- County: Krosno
- Gmina: Bobrowice
- Population: 653

Dychów ([ˈdɨxuf]; German: Deichow) is a village in the administrative district of Gmina Bobrowice, within Krosno County, Lubusz Voivodeship, in western Poland.
