= Żarków =

- Village
- Location within Poland
- Coordinates: 51°53′N 15°8′E
- Country: Poland
- Voivodeship: Lubusz
- County: Krosno
- Gmina: Bobrowice
- Population: 71

Żarków ([ˈʐarkuf]; German: Sarkow) is a village in the administrative district of Gmina Bobrowice, within Krosno County, Lubusz Voivodeship, in western Poland.
