= Georg Wenzeslaus von Knobelsdorff =

Polish painter and architect in Prussia

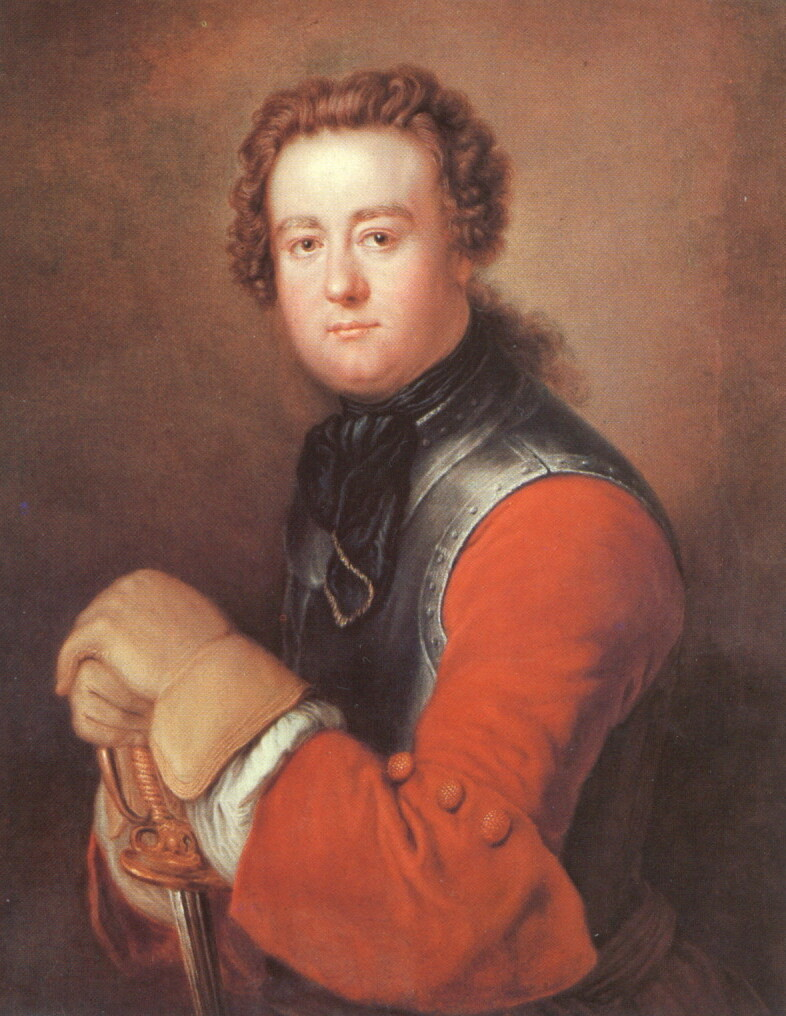
Officer, architect and painter Georg Wenzeslaus Baron von Knobelsdorff, 1737 (by Antoine Pesne, 1738)

(Hans) Georg Wenzeslaus von Knobelsdorff (17 February 1699 – 16 September 1753) was a painter, military officer, and architect in Prussia.

Knobelsdorff was born in Kuckädel, now in Krosno County. A soldier in the service of Prussia, he resigned his commission in 1729 as captain so that he could pursue his interest in architecture. In 1740 he travelled to Paris and Italy to study at the expense of the new king, Frederick II of Prussia.

Knobelsdorff was influenced as an architect by French Baroque Classicism and by Palladian architecture. With his interior design and the backing of the king, he created the basis for the Frederician Rococo style at Rheinsberg, which was the residence of the crown prince and later monarch.

Knobelsdorff was the head custodian of royal buildings and head of a privy council on financial matters. In 1746 he was dismissed by the king, and Johann Boumann finished all his projects, including Sanssouci.

Knobelsdorff died in Berlin. His grave is preserved in the Protestant Friedhof I der Jerusalems- und Neuen Kirchengemeinde (Cemetery No. I of the congregations of Jerusalem's Church and New Church) in Berlin-Kreuzberg, south of Hallesches Tor.

Karl Begas the younger created a statue of Knobelsdorff in 1886. This originally stood in the entrance hall of the Altes Museum (in Berlin) and is now in a depot of the state museum.

== Life and works ==
=== Military service and artistic development ===
Georg Wenzeslaus von Knobelsdorff, the son of Silesian landed gentry, was born on February 17, 1699, on the estate of Kuckädel (now Polish Kukadlo) near Crossen (now the Polish city Krosno Odrzańskie) on the Oder River. After the early death of his father he was raised by his godfather, the chief senior forester Georg von Knobelsdorff. In keeping with family tradition he began his professional career in the Prussian army. Already at 16 years of age he participated in a campaign against King Charles XII of Sweden, and in 1715 in the siege of Stralsund.

While still a soldier he developed his artistic talents in self-study. After leaving military service he arranged to be trained in various painting techniques by the Prussian court painter Antoine Pesne, with whom he shared a lifelong friendship. Knobelsdorff also acquired additional expertise in geometry and anatomy. He saw his professional future in painting, and his pictures and drawings were always highly appreciated, even after the focus of his activities turned elsewhere.

His interest in architecture developed in a roundabout way, and came from representing buildings in his pictures. Later, the pictorial aspect of his architectural sketches was often noted and met with varying reactions. Heinrich Ludwig Manger, as an architect more a technician than an artist, wrote with a critical undertone in 1789 in his Baugeschichte von Potsdam, that Knobelsdorff designed his buildings "merely in a perspective and picturesque way", but praised his paintings. Frederick the Great, in contrast, commented positively on the architect's "picturesque style" (gout pittoresque). There is also no evidence that the informal style of his drawings ever posed a serious impediment to the execution of his buildings.

Knobelsdorff acquired the expertise needed for his new profession again primarily in self-study, after a brief period of training under the architects Kemmeter and von Wangenheim. This breed of "gentlemen architects" was not unusual in the 16th and 17th centuries, and they were esteemed both socially and because of their specialized competence. They trained themselves by studying actual buildings on extensive travels as well as collections of engravings showing views of classical and contemporary buildings. Knobelsdorff's ideal models, the Englishmen Inigo Jones (1573–1652) and William Kent (1684–1748) as well as the Frenchman Claude Perrault (1613–1688), likewise grew into their professions in a roundabout way and were no longer young men when they turned to architecture.

=== Neuruppin and Rheinsberg ===
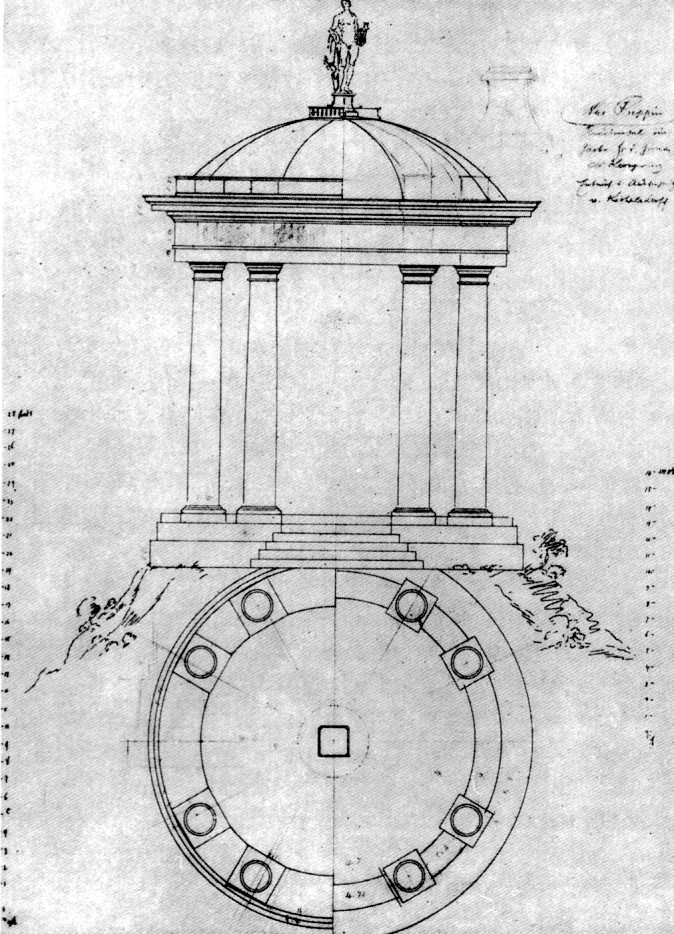
Design for the Apollo Temple in Neuruppin

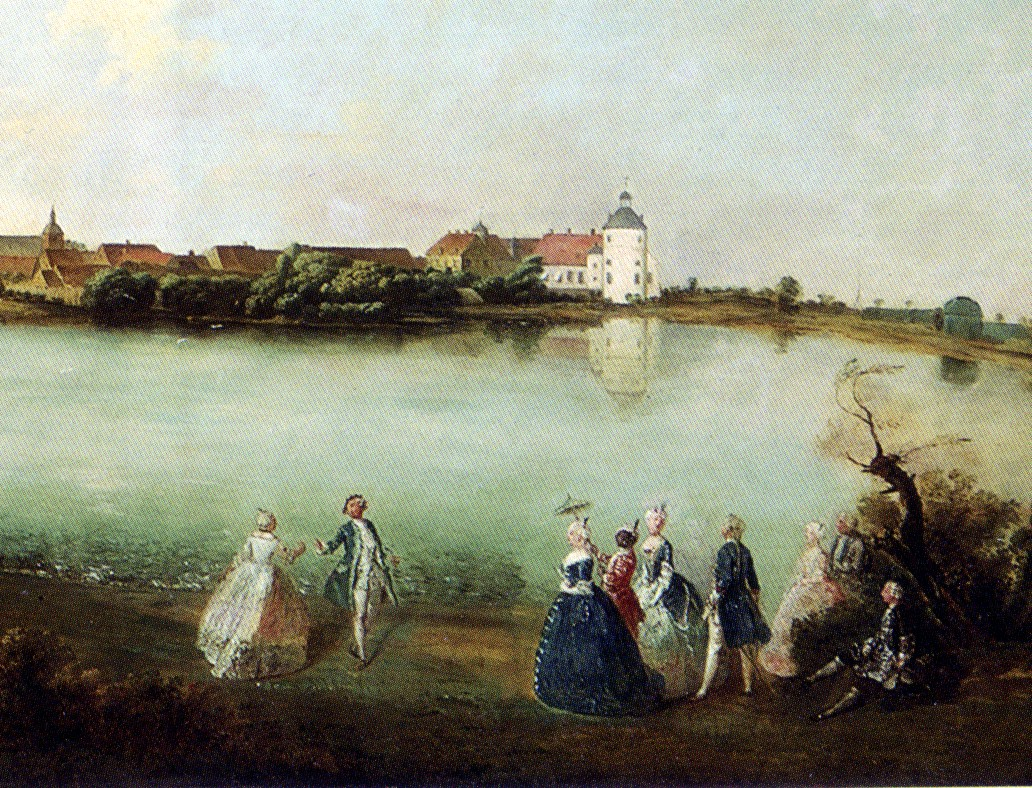
View of Rheinsberg 1737, excerpt from a Knobelsdorff painting

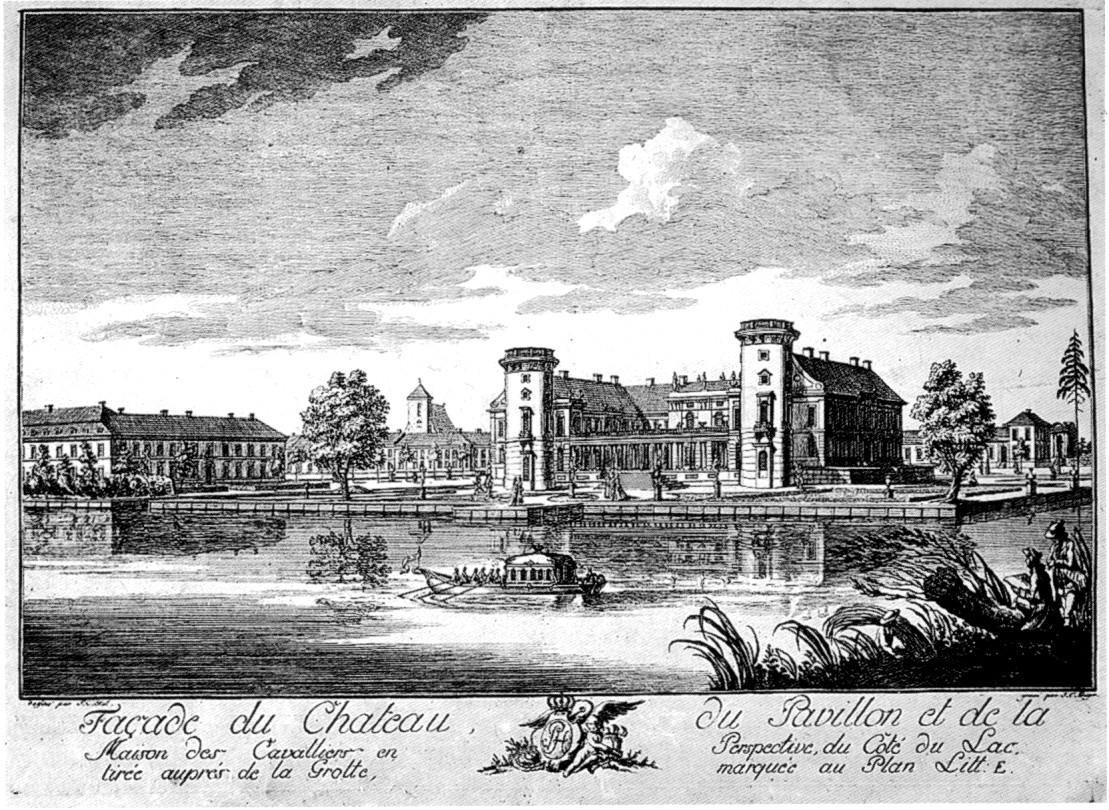
Rheinsberg Castle around 1740, excerpt from an engraving

Knobelsdorff gained the attention of King Frederick William I of Prussia (the "Soldier-King"), who had him join the entourage of his son, crown prince Frederick, later King Frederick II (Frederick the Great). After his failed attempt to flee Prussia and subsequent imprisonment in Küstrin, (now Kostrzyn nad Odrą in Poland), Frederick had just been granted somewhat more freedom of movement by his strict father. Apparently, the king hoped that Knobelsdorff, as a sensible and artistically talented nobleman, would have a moderating influence on his son. (The sources vary as to what prompted the first meeting between Knobelsdorff and Frederick, but they all date the event as being in 1732.)

At the time the crown prince, who had been appointed a colonel when he turned 20, took over responsibility for a regiment in the garrison town of Neuruppin. Knobelsdorf became his partner in discussions and advised him on issues of art and architecture. Immediately in front of the city walls they jointly planned the Amalthea garden, which contained a monopteros, a little Apollo temple of classical design. This was the first construction of its type on the European continent and Knobelsdorff's first creation as Frederick the Great's architect. This was where they made music, philosophized, and celebrated, and also after the crown prince had moved to nearby Rheinsberg Castle he frequently visited the temple garden during visits connected with his duties as commander in the Neuruppin garrison.

In 1736 the crown prince gave Knobelsdorff an opportunity to go on a study tour to Italy, which lasted until spring 1737. His stops included Rome, Naples and vicinity, Florence and Venice. His recorded his impressions in a travel sketchbook which contains almost one hundred pencil drawings, but only of part of his trip since on the return stretch he broke his arm in a traffic accident between Rome and Florence. He was unable to carry out a secret mission which involved engaging Italian opera singers to come to Rheinsburg since the available funds were inadequate. Knobelsdorff wrote to the crown prince that "The castrati here cannot be tempted to leave [...] regular employment, especially for those from the poorer classes, is the reason why they prefer 100 Rthlr (Reichstaler) in Rome to thousands abroad. In autumn 1740, shortly after Frederick assumed the throne, Knobelsdorff was sent on another study tour. In Paris only the work of the architect Perrault impressed him—the frontage of the Louvre and the garden side of the castle in Versailles. As to paintings, he listed those of Watteau, Poussin, Chardin and others. On the return trip via Flanders he saw paintings by van Dyck and Rubens.

Rheinsberg Palace and the modest household of the crown prince became a place of relaxed communion and artistic creativity, quite in contrast to the dry, matter-of-fact atmosphere at the Berlin court of the soldier-king. This was where Frederick and Knobelsdorff discussed architecture and city planning, and developed their first ideas for an extensive program of construction which was to be realized when the crown prince assumed the throne. Rheinsberg was where Knobelsdorff received his first major architectural challenge. At that time the palace consisted only of a tower and a building wing. In a painting from 1737 Knobelsdorff depicted the situation before the alterations, as viewed from the far shore of Lake Grienericksee. After preliminary work by the architect and builder Kemmeter and in regular consultation with Frederick, Kobelsdorff gave the ensemble its present form. He extended the grounds by a second tower and matching building wing and by a colonnade connecting both towers.

=== Forum Fridericianum ===
As a significant construction, this design was planned already in Rheinsberg as a signal for the start Frederick's reign. In Berlin the king wanted to have a new city palace that could stand up to the splendid residences of major European powers. Knobelsdorff designed an extensive building complex with inner courtyards and in front a cour d'honneur and semicircular colonnades just north of the street Unter den Linden. In front of that he planned a spacious square with two free-standing buildings—an opera house and a hall for ball games. Soon after Frederick acceded to the throne in May 1740, foundation testing began, as well as negotiations about the purchase and demolition of 54 houses that interfered with the project. Already on August 19, 1740, all these preparations were discontinued, supposedly because the intended ground was unsuitable. But in fact the king's distant relatives refused to sell their palaces, which were located in the middle of the planned square.

Frederick attempted to rescue the situation and sketched in modifications on the plan of the layout. When the First Silesian War (1740–1742) began, decisions about the Forum had to be postponed. However, even while the war was being waged the king wanted Knobelsdorff to begin construction of the opera house, today's Berlin State Opera (Staatsoper Unter den Linden). Ultimately, an urban development project resulted in the Fridericanium complex known today as Bebelplatz, a cathedral is flanked by a library and a state-palace.

The work of the Forum Fridericianum languished after the end of the war. Beginning of 1745 Frederick's increasing interest in Potsdam as a second residence became evident and the original plans moved into the background. Construction of the opera house moved in another direction. In 1747 work began on St. Hedwig's Cathedral, in 1748 on the Prince Heinrich Palace, and between 1775 and 1786 the Royal Library was erected. The final square bore little resemblance to the original plan, but was highly praised already by contemporaries and also in this form caused the royal architect to achieve great eminence. The terms "Frederick's Forum" and "Forum Fridericianum" only appeared in specialist literature in the 19th century and were never officially used to refer to the square.

=== Opera House and St. Hedwig's Cathedral ===
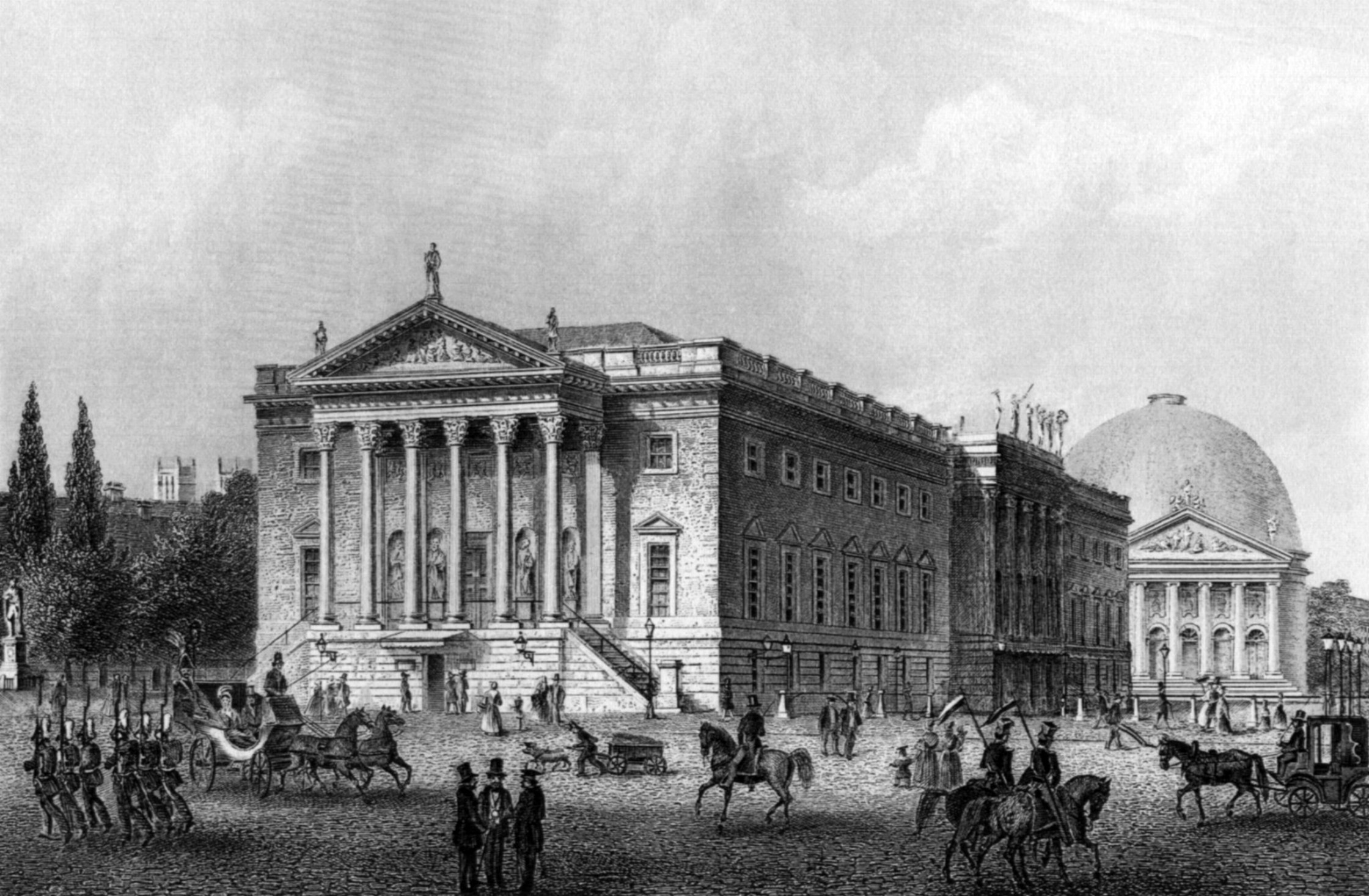
Berlin Opera House and St. Hedwig's Cathedral in 1850

Knobelsdorff was involved in the construction of St. Hedwig's Cathedral, but it is uncertain to what extent. Frederick II presented the Catholic community with complete building plans, which were probably primarily his ideas which were then realized by Knobelsdorff. The opera house, by contrast, was completely designed by Knobelsdorff and is considered to be one of his most important works. For the frontage of the externally modestly structured building the architect followed the model of two views from Colin Campbell's "Vitruvius Britannicus", one of the most important collections of architectonic engravings, which included works of English Palladian architecture. For the interior he designed a series of three prominent rooms with different functions, which were at different levels, and were decorated differently: the Apollo Hall, the spectator viewing area, and the stage. By technical means they could be turned into one large room for major festivities. Knobelsdorff described the technical features in a Berlin newspaper, proudly commenting that "this theater is one of the longest and widest in the world". In 1843 the building burned down to the foundation. In World War II it suffered several times from bombing. Each time the rebuilding followed Knobelsdorff's intentions, but there were also clear modifications of both the facing and the interior. Soon after they were completed, the opera house and St. Hedwig's Cathedral were featured in textbooks and manuals on architecture.

=== Tiergarten park and dairy ===
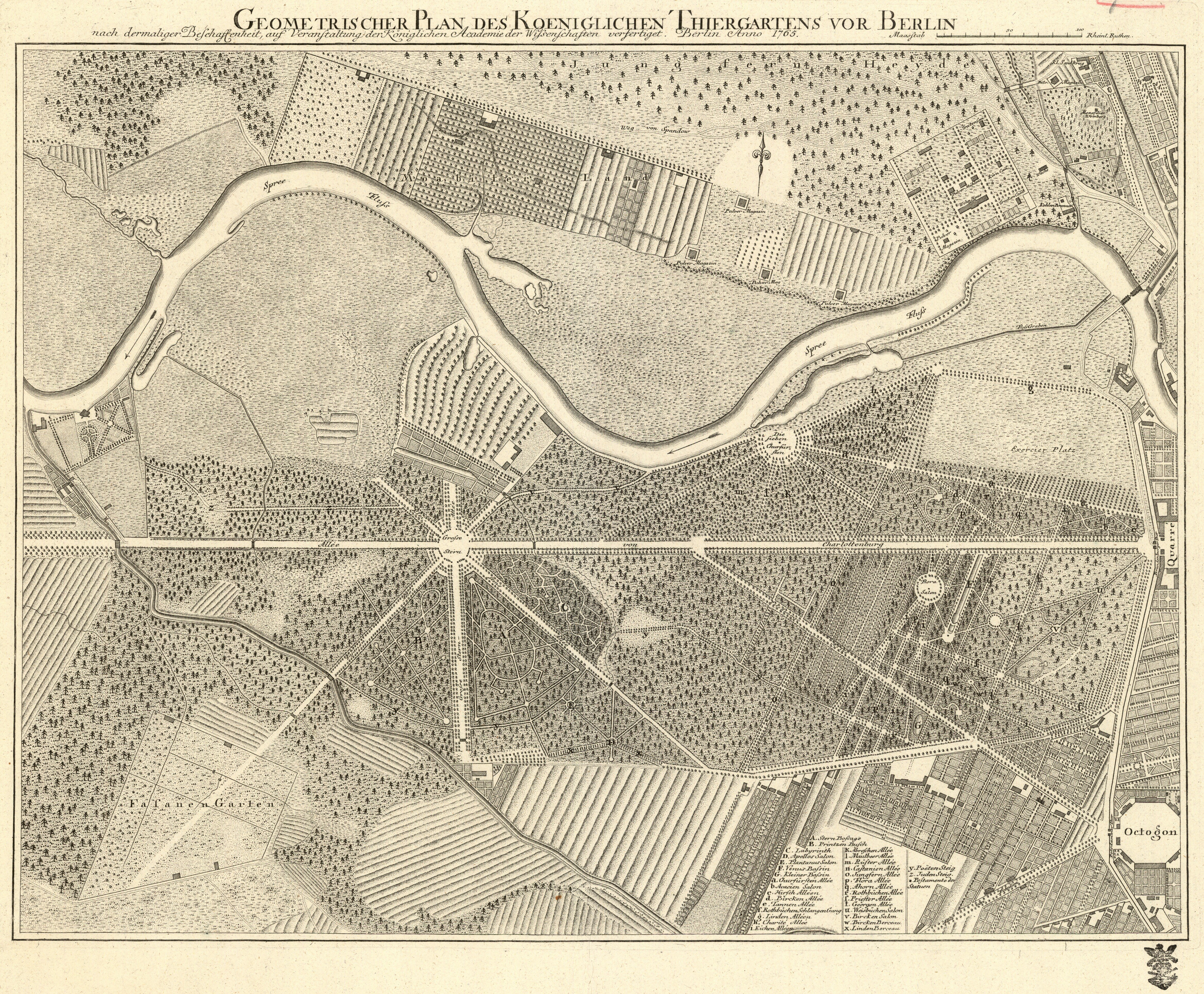
The Tiergarten Park in Berlin, 1765

Already in Neuruppin and Rheinsberg Knobelsdorff had designed gardens, together with the crown prince, which followed a French style. On November 30, 1741, Frederick II, now king, issued a decree which initiated the redesign of the Berlin Tiergarten to make it the "Parc de Berlin". The document pointed out that Baron Knobelsdorff had received precise instructions concerning the changeover. The Tiergarten, in times past the private hunting grounds of the Electors and greatly neglected under Frederick's father, was to be turned into the public park and gardens of the royal residence city Berlin. In order to protect the newly cultivated areas the practice of driving cattle on the grounds was forbidden with immediate effect. Frederick's interest in this project can also be recognized in a later decree, which forbade the removal of large bushes or trees without the specific permission of the king.

As a precondition to redesigning the Tiergarten, large portions of the grounds had to be drained. In many cases Knobelsdorff gave the necessary drainage ditches the form of natural waterfalls, a solution which Friedrich II later praised. The actual work began with the improvement of the main axis of the park, a path which extended the boulevard Unter den Linden through the Tiergarten to Charlottenburg (now Strasse des 17. Juni. This road was lined with hedges, and the junction of eight avenues marked by the Berlin victory column (Siegessäule) was decorated with 16 statues. To the south Knobelsdorff arranged for three so-called labyrinths (these were actually mazes) in the pattern of famous French parks—areas separated off with artistically designed intertwined hedgerows. Especially in the eastern part of the park near the Brandenburg Gate there was a dense network of pathways which constantly intersected and contained many "salons" and "cabinets"—small enclosed areas so to speak "furnished" with benches and fountains. Knobelsdorff's successor, the court gardener Justus Ehrenreich Sello, began the modification of these late Barock pleasure grounds in the style of the new ideal of an English landscape park. Toward the end of the 18th century there was hardly anything left of Knobelsdorff's version except for the main features of the system of paths. But the fact remains that he designed the first park in Germany open to the public from the very beginning.

At the beginning of 1746 Knobelsdorff purchased at a good price extensive grounds on the verge of the Tiergarten at an auction. His land was situated between the victory column and the Spree River, about where today Bellevue Palace is located. The property included a mulberry plantation, meadows and farmland, vegetable beds and two dairies. Knobelsdorff had a new main building erected, externally a plain garden house. The wall and ceiling paintings in several rooms were considered to be a present from Antoine Pesne to his student and friend. The building was demolished in 1938. A number of biographers were of the opinion that Knobelsdorff used his property in the Tiergarten only to spend the idyllic summer months there together with his family each year, but this land was actually intensively cultivated as both a fruit and a vegetable garden, and turned out to be a useful investment. Knobelsdorff himself read books about the care of fruit trees and the cultivation of vegetables. One of them, (Ecole du Jardin potageur) contained a taxonomy of various kinds of vegetables, organized according to their curative powers. This gave rise to the suspicion that Knobelsdorff hoped for some relief from his chronic health problems from the plants in his garden.

=== Monbijou, Charlottenburg, Potsdam City Palace ===
The structural modifications to these three palaces are part of the extensive program that Knobelsdorff tackled on behalf of Frederick II right after he acceded to the throne, or a few years thereafter.

Monbijou Palace started out as a single-storey pavilion with gardens on the Spree and was the summer residence, and after 1740 the widow's seat, of queen Sophie Dorothee of Prussia, the mother of Frederick II. The pavilion soon turned out to be too small for the queen's representational needs, having only five rooms and a gallery. Under Knobelsdorff's leadership the building was expanded in two phases between 1738 and 1742 into an extensive, symmetrical structure with side wings and small pavilions. Surfaces with strong colors, gilding, ornaments and sculptures gave structure to the lengthy building. This version was gone already by 1755. Up until its almost total destruction in World War II the facing had a smooth white plaster coating. All remains of the building were cleared away in 1959/60.

Charlottenburg Palace was hardly used under Frederick William I. His son considered residing there and right at the beginning of his reign had it enlarged by Knobelsdorff. Thus a new part of the building arose, east of the original palace and known as the new wing or Knobelsdorff wing. It contained two rooms famous for their decoration. The White Hall, Frederick the Great's dining and throne room with a ceiling painting by Pesne, leaves a restrained, almost Classicist, impression. By contrast, the Golden Gallery with its very rich ornamentation, green and gold colors is considered the epitome of Frederician rococo. The contrast between these two neighboring rooms makes clear the range of Knobelsdorff's artistic forms of expression. The king's interest in Charlottenburg waned as he began to consider Potsdam as a second official residence, started to build there, and finally lived there. Charlottenburg Palace was heavily damaged in World War II and after 1945 reconstructed in a form faithful to the original to a large extent.

Potsdam City Palace. This baroque edifice was completed in 1669. After plans for a new palace residence in Berlin were abandoned, Frederick the Great had the castle rebuilt by Knobelsdorff between 1744 and 1752, with rich interior decorations in rococo style. His changes to the frontage had the goal of lightening up the massive building. Pilasters and figures of light colored sandstone clearly projected from red plaster surfaces. Numerous decorative elements were added and the blue-lacquered copper-covered roofs were crowned with richly decorated chimneys. Many of these details were soon lost and not replaced. In World War II the building was badly damaged and 1959/60 what was left was completely removed. The Brandenburg State Parliament decided to have the City Palace rebuilt by 2011, at least as to its exterior. Since 2002 a copy of part of the building, the so-called Fortuna portico, has been reconstructed at its historic location.

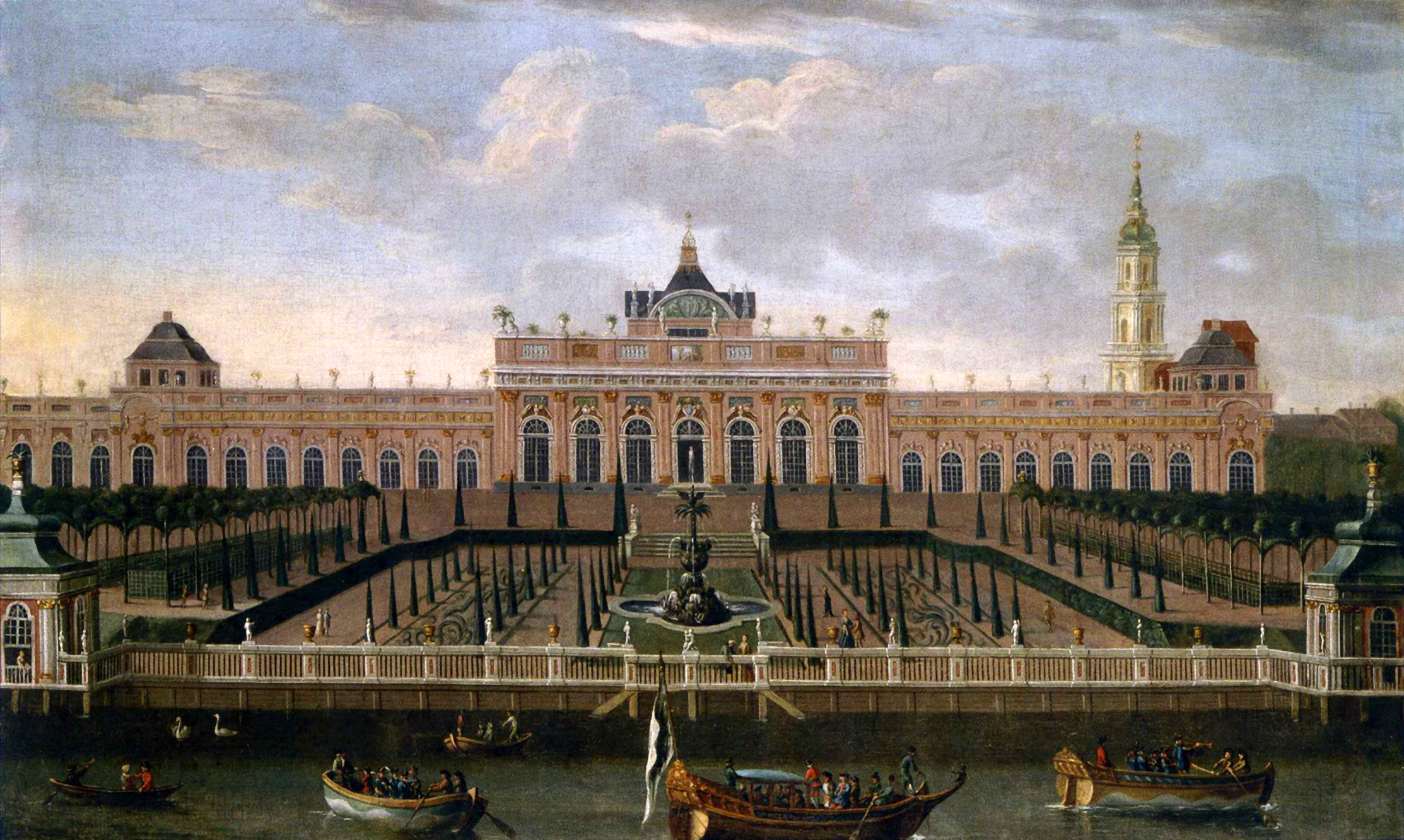
Monbijou Palace, 1739

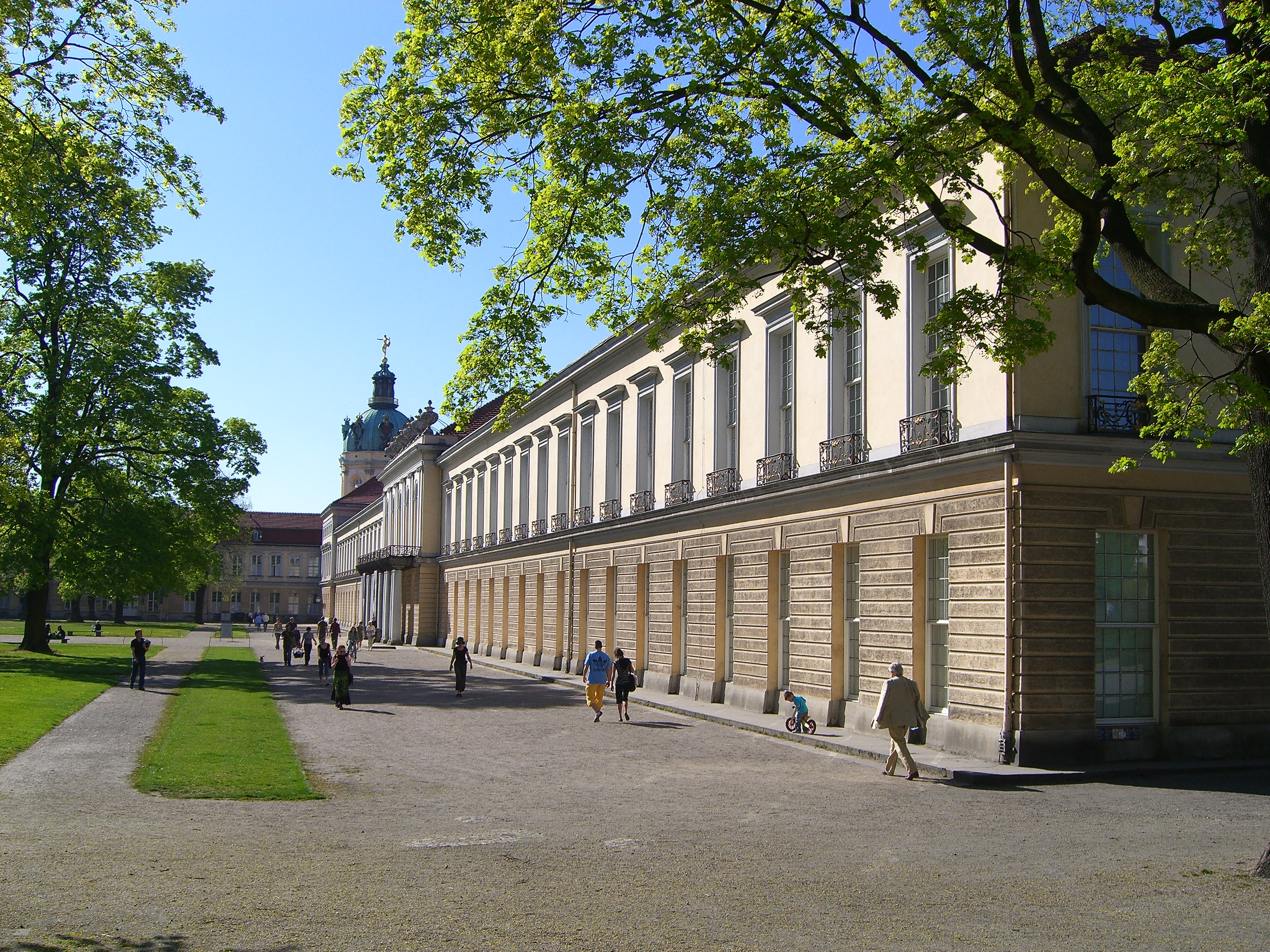
The Knobelsdorf wing of Charlottenburg Palace

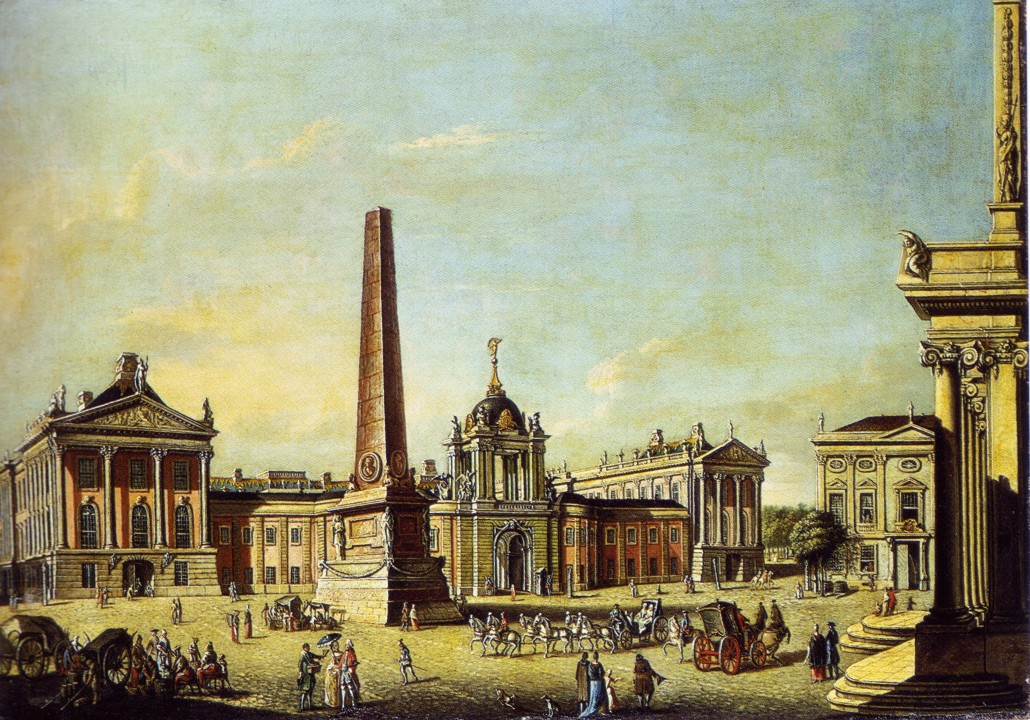
Potsdam City Palace with Fortuna portico and obelisk

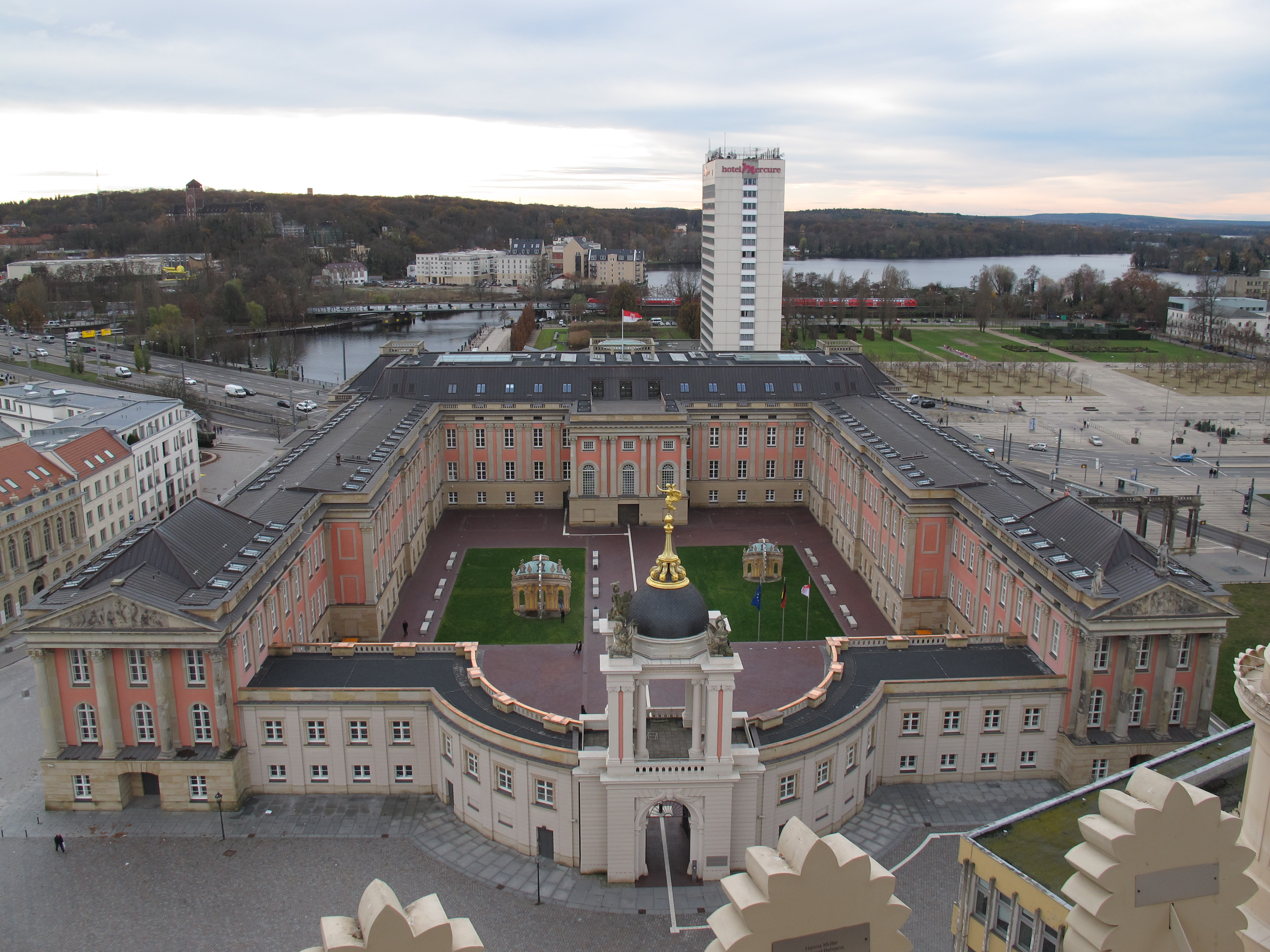
The reconstructed Potsdam City Palace with Fortuna portico, 2016

=== Sanssouci Palace ===
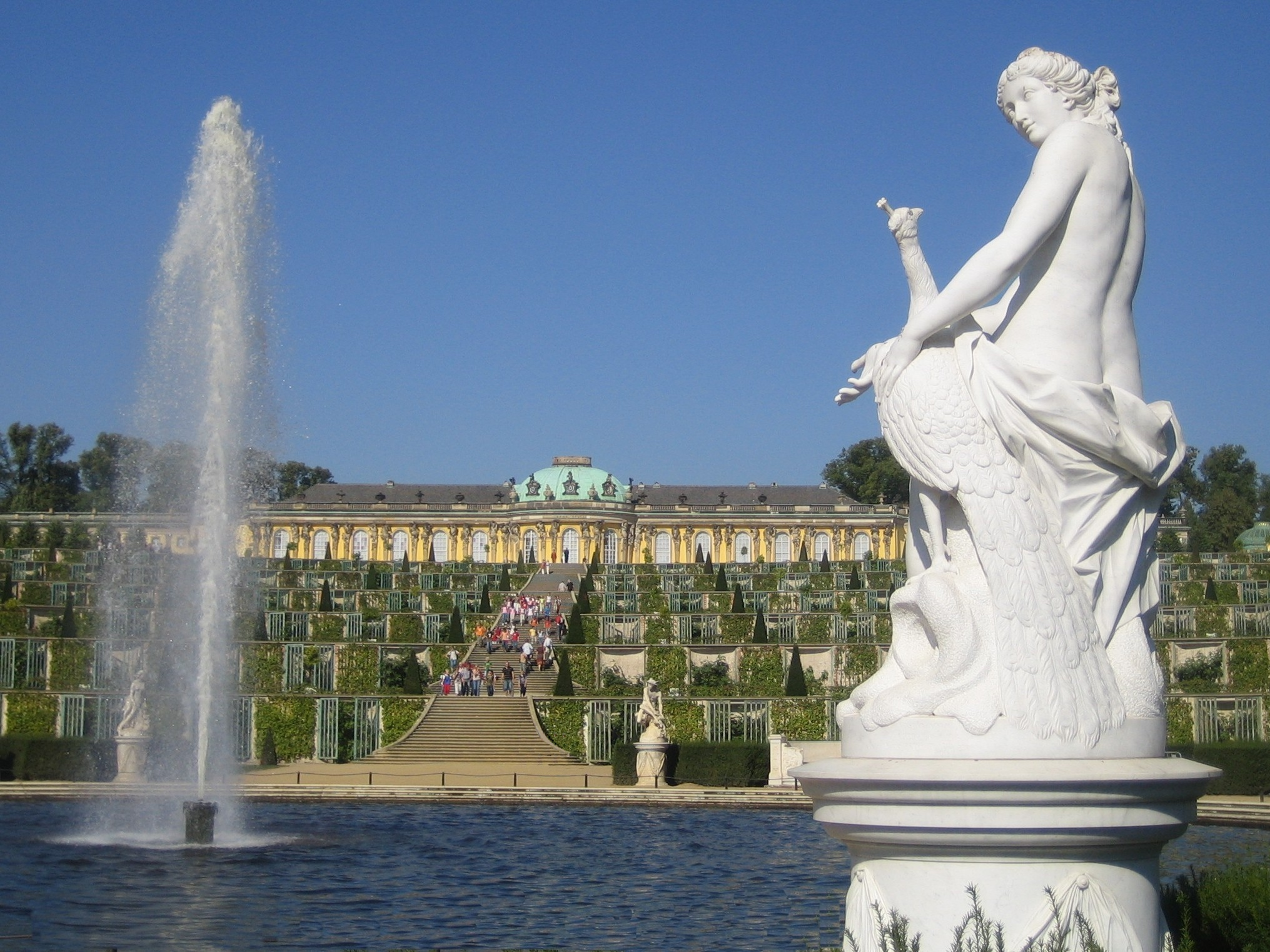
Sanssouci Palace and the Great Fountain

On January 13, 1745, Frederick the Great arranged for the construction of a summer house in Potsdam ("Lust-Haus zu Potsdam"). He had made quite specific sketches of what he desired, and had Knobelsdorff take care of the realization. They specified a single storey building resting on the ground of the vineyard terraces on the southern slope of the Bornstedt Heights in northwest Potsdam. Knobelsdorff raised objections to this idea; he wanted to increase the height of the building by adding a souterrain level to serve as a pedestal, plus a basement, and to move it forward to the edge of the terraces since it would otherwise look as if it had sunk into the ground if viewed from the foot of the vineyard hill. Frederick however insisted on his version. Even the suggestion that his plan increased the possibility of suffering from gout and catching cold did not cause Frederick to change his mind. Later he ran into these very difficulties, but bore them without complaint. After only two years of construction, Sansoussi Palace ("my little vineyard house") was how Frederick referred to it) was dedicated on May 1, 1747. Frederick the Great usually resided there from May to September; the winter months he spent in the Potsdam City Palace.

=== Decorative art ===
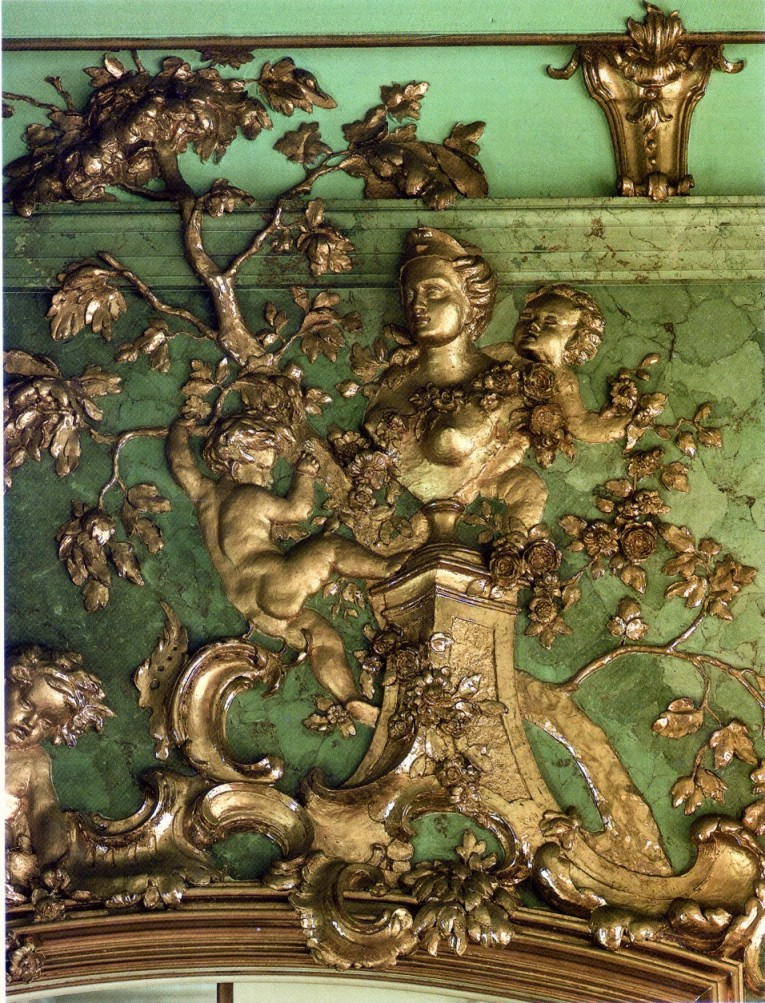
Schloss Charlottenburg, Golden Gallery. Detail

Evidence for Knobelsdorff's artistic versatility is found in his designs for garden vases, mirror frames, furniture and coaches. This kind of activity culminated in the design of large representational rooms, such as the spectator area of the Berlin State Opera Unter den Lindon and the large rooms in Charlottenburg Palace. Decorative ornamentation was an important feature of European rococo. Three French masters of this art, Antoine Watteau, Jules Aurele Meissonier and Jaques de La Joue, had created patterns and models which found wide circulation in the form of etchings and engravings. Knobelsdorff was obviously especially influenced by Watteau's work, whose motifs he had taken over and adapted in Rheinsberg for mirror and picture frames.

This influence turned out to be determinative for the design of the Golden Gallery in the New Wing of Charlottenburg Palace, a masterpiece of Frederician rokoko, built between 1741 and 1746. It was destroyed in World War II and later rebuilt. The artist, who himself had a lifelong affinity with nature, created here an artistic realm which was intended to evoke and glorify nature. At the same time the scenery of the actual palace park was brought into the room with the help of mirrors. The gallery is 42 meters long; the walls are covered with chrysoprase green scagliola; ornaments, benches and corbels are gilded. The walls and ceiling are covered with ornaments based in most cases on plant motifs. Watteau's notion of ornamental grotesques—a frame of fanciful plants and architectonic motifs surrounds a scene showing trees and people undertaking rural pleasures—clearly often served as inspiration.

=== The French church in Potsdam ===
The French Church is one of Knobelsdorff's late works. For the Huguenot congregation he designed a small round building which recalled the Pantheon in Rome. Construction was carried out by Jan Boumann, whose talents as an architect were not esteemed by Knobelsdorff, but who was often preferred for commissions in later years. The church has an oval ground plan of about 15:20 meters and a free-floating dome which 80 years later Karl Friedrich Schinkel declared to be very daring as to its statics. The modest interior gives the impression of an amphitheater because of the encircling wooden balcony. As specified by the French Reformed Church service there were no embellishments—no cross, no baptismal font, no figural decoration. Frederick II handed over the completed church to the Potsdam congregation on September 16, 1753, the day of Knobelsdorff's death.

In the 19th century Schinkel modified the interior fittings, since they had in the meantime come into disrepair. The church had been built on a damp foundation so damages appeared in quick succession. The church had to be closed several times for periods of years, but in the end it even managed to survive World War II intact. The latest extensive renovations took place from 1990 to 2003.

== Illness and death ==
In 1753 Knobelsdorff's long-time liver disease became more troublesome. A journey to the Belgian therapeutic baths at Spa brought no relief. On September 7, 1753, only a short while before his death, Knobelsdorff wrote to the king, "when the pain briefly stopped". He thanked him "for all the kindness and all the benefits Your Majesty has showered on me during my lifetime". At the same time he requested that his two daughters be recognized as his legal heirs. That was problematic because the girls came from a liaison not befitting his social class. The long-time bachelor Knobelsdorff had entered into a relationship with the "middle class" daughter of the Charlottenburg sacristan, Schöne, in 1746, thereby earning the disapproval of court society. Frederick II agreed to his request, however with the restriction that his title of nobility not be bequeathed.

Knobelsdorff died on September 16, 1753. Two days later the Berlinische Nachrichten reported, "On the 16th of this month the honorable gentleman, Mr. George Wentzel, Baron of Knobelsdorff, artistic director of all royal palaces, houses and gardens, director-in-chief of all construction in all provinces, as well as finance, war and domain councillor, departed this life after a prolonged illness in the 53rd year of his renowned existence." On September 18 he was buried in the vault of the German Church on Gendarmenmarkt. Four years later his friend Antoine Pesne was buried next to him. When the church was rebuilt in 1881 these mortal remains were transferred to one of the cemeteries at Hallisches Tor; his grave was marked with a marble slab and a putto. This gravesite was destroyed by a bomb in World War II. Today a simple white marble memorial on an honorary grave of the State of Berlin in Cemetery No. 1 of the Jerusalem and New Church congregation brings to mind Knobelsdorff and Pesne.

== Models ==
As an architect Knobelsdorff was greatly influenced by Andrea Palladio's buildings and theoretical works on architecture. This important Italian architect of the High Renaissance published in 1570 the definitive work, "Quattro libri dell'architettura" containing his own creations as well numerous drawings of antique architecture. Stimulated by Palladio, a building style developed which was widespread in the 17th century in Protestant and Anglican Northern Europe, especially England. In contrast to the simultaneous baroque style with its silhouettes and concave-convex frontage reliefs, Palladianism made use of classically simple, clear shapes. Knobelsdorff also undertook to follow this style on almost all his buildings, at least as far as the exteriors. He did not simply copy the models but converted them into his own style (only after his death did direct copies of foreign frontages become common in Berlin and Potsdam). In the broad sense he already represented Classicism, which in the narrow sense only began in Prussia in the late 18th century and achieved its apex in the early 19th century with Karl Friedrich Schinkel. As to interior decoration, Knobelsdorff followed from the beginning the main fashions of his time and provided superb examples of late baroque decorative art in his Frederician rococo style, which was inspired by French models.

== Art collection ==
Knobelsdorff was an enthusiastic collector of art, a fact unknown until the recent discovery of old inventory lists. He bequeathed to his friend, Lieutenant Colonel von Keith, an extensive collection of paintings and engravings virtually unmatched in 18th century Berlin. The trustees of his estate counted and appraised 368 paintings valued at ca. 5400 Reichstaler and over 100 engravings worth 400 Reichstaler. It is not clear how Knobelsdorff could have purchased such a considerable collection. There was no regular art market at that time in Berlin; at most, there were individual sales or legacy auctions which sometimes also included works of art. Probably contacts with Amsterdam and Rotterdam, centers of a thriving Dutch art market, were of use. The focus of his art collection was on landscape painting, especially Dutch paintings from the second half of the 17th century. Portraits were another important part of the collection, and there were also some scenes of battles, reflecting the taste of the times. Contemporary painters were hardly represented, and there were 37 specimens of Knobelsdorff's own work. Soon after his death the collection was dispersed and sold.

== Knobelsdorff and Friedrich II. ==
Knobelsdorff's relationship to Frederick II was a central aspect of his life. Something akin to friendship arose in Neuruppin and Rheinsberg from their joint interest in art and architecture. This almost constant personal contact and focus on only a few subjects important to both of them came to a natural end when the crown prince acceded to the throne as Frederick II in 1740 and concentrated on new areas such as waging war and administering the state, which meant he had to establish and maintain contacts with a much larger circle of advisors and collaborators.

Since Frederick recognized the qualities of Knobelsdorff and expected great things of him he immediately bombarded him with work, but also gave him titles and awards and allocated a magnificent house in Leipziger Strasse for his use while in his service. He was given overall control of all royal buildings, and was also director of plays and musical performances (until 1742). Besides his specific architectural duties he had to carry out administrative tasks and deal with many side issues, such as arranging for fireworks in the Charlottenburg Palace gardens, design decorations for the opera, and deal with horse stables in Berlin. Although Knobelsdorff usually provided only plans and projections and left their realization to experienced architects and technicians, the work was sometimes more than he could manage. This annoyed the impatient king. In 1732 he urged him to work faster, "so that I will have no reason to show my displeasure and to make changes in arrangements for the house I gave you as a residence in berlin.... He does not carry out anything the way I want it and is as lazy as an artillery horse". In the beginning such disagreements were the exception .

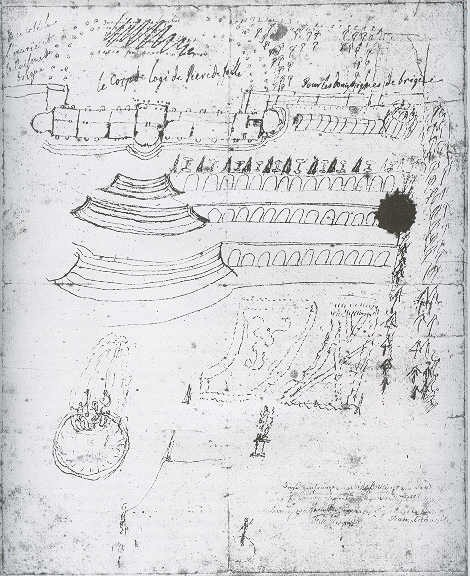
Frederick the Great's sketch showing his intentions for Sanssouci Palace

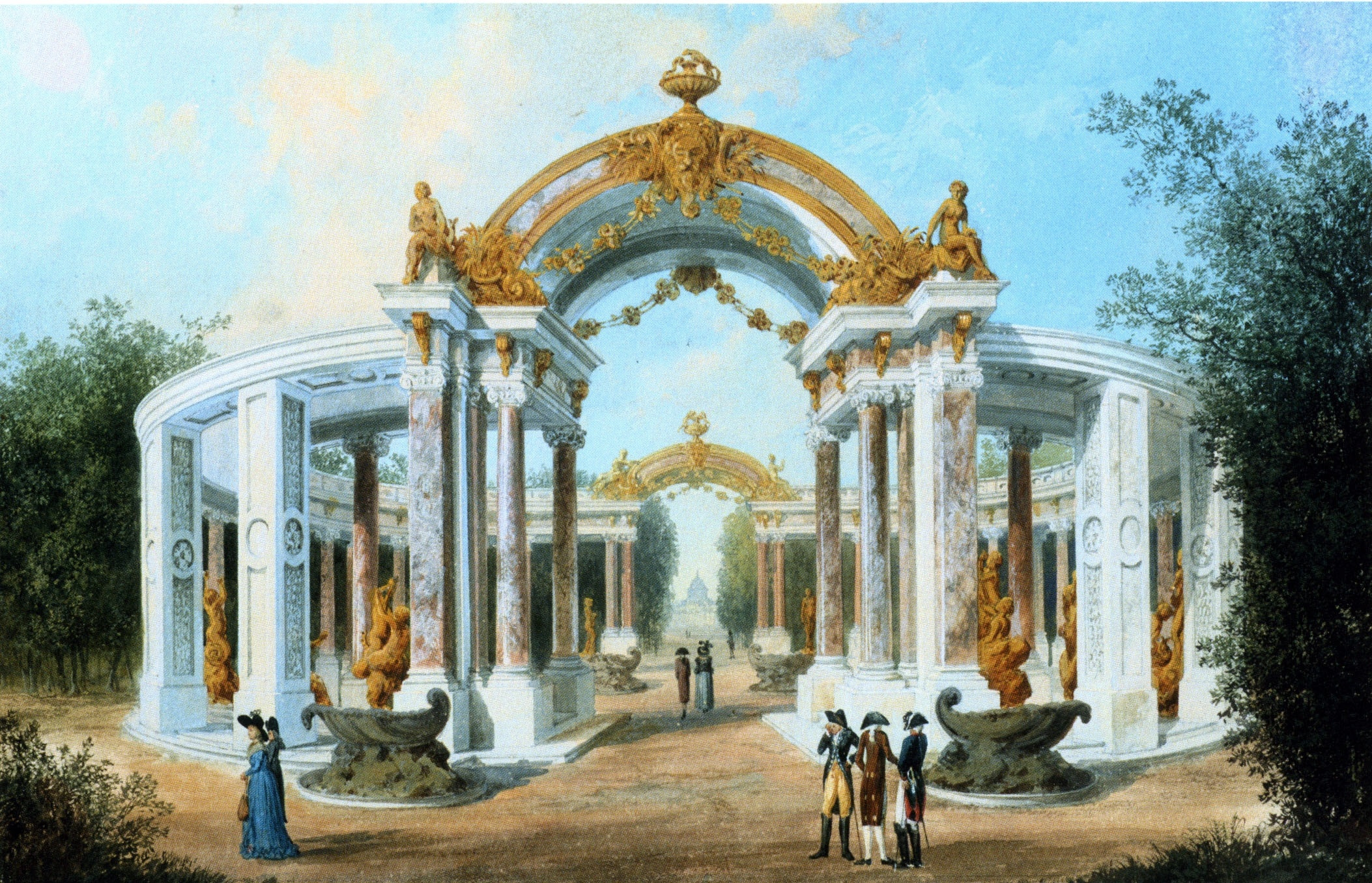
The deer garden colonnade in Sanssouci Park, which did not survive

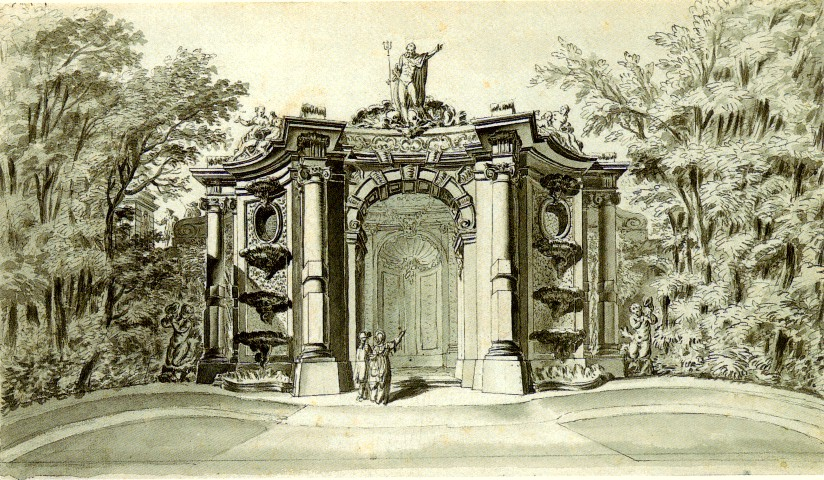
Proposal for the Neptune grotto in Sanssouci Park

But from the start there was a fundamental disagreement which gradually became more and more evident. For Knobelsdorff, who was a serious artist, architecture and painting were at the core of his being. Frederick the Great had a lively interest in both and developed some pertinent expertise, but remained an outsider for whom concern with architecture could not be the main focus of attention. He sometimes compared his interest in these matters with the lighthearted pleasure of a child playing with dolls. Both the king and his architect were uncompromising, occasionally brusque personalities. Accordingly, different views about factual issues increasingly turned into personal tensions. When Knobelsdorff strongly disagreed with the king concerning plans for Sanssouci Palace, he was removed from his position of responsibility for the construction of the palace in April 1746, ostensibly for health reasons. In 1747 complete disorder was discovered in the expense accounts managed by the building controller, Fincke, who had for years been involved in major projects under Knobelsdorff's leadership. Frederick thereupon wrote a letter to his architect which "expressed his extreme displeasure" with the fact that he "no longer pays attention to orderliness and correctness."

This was the start of a permanent estrangement. Although Knobelsdorff continued to receive all types of building assignments—he designed the deer garden colonnade (Marble Colonnade), the Neptune grotto in Potsdam, the Neustadt Gate, several residences, the French Church, the obelisk on the market square and many other objects—for years he kept at a distance to the royal court. An attempt to bridge this gap ended in failure. The king summoned him to Potsdam in summer 1750, but soon got annoyed about some comment of the architect's and ordered him to return to Berlin. Knobelsdorff immediately set out, but halfway to Berlin a Feldjäger (military policeman) caught up with him with the message that he was to return to the court. According to tradition his response was, "The king himself ordered me to return to Berlin. I well know whether I have to follow his orders or those of a Feldjäger", whereupon he continued his journey. After that episode he never saw the king again.

Frederick II had apparently provided sketches of his own for all major buildings on which Knobelsdorff worked, and it is not always possible to determine the extent of his contribution. Whoever wants to evaluate his share in the creative process must also consider that the king's sketches might reflect the results of joint deliberations with his architect. In the beginning the young crown prince regarded Knobelsdorff, who was 13 years older than he, as his mentor in questions of art and architecture, and followed his suggestions. Later he frequently insisted on his own views in particular cases, and enforced them with the authority of his superior position. But basically his artistic opinions were in agreement with those of Knobelsdorff. Even after the latter's death he had, for example, the theater room and the marble hall of the Potsdam City Palace, both designed by Knobelsdorff, copied in the New Palace of Sanssouci—which suggests that the tensions which finally arose were not primarily a result of artistic differences but rather of personal touchiness.

== Personal assessments ==
Jakob Friedrich Baron von Bielfeld, who was for a time part of the crown prince's retinue in Rheinsberg, wrote in 1739: "Mr. von Knobelsdorff is a gentleman of serious disposition and with a somewhat stern visage, but of considerable merit. His external appearance is neither charming nor courtly, but that makes him no less admirable. I compare him to a beautiful oak tree, and you know, it is not at all necessary for all the trees in a garden to be trimmed into arches as gracefully as in Marly" (translation).

Heinrich Ludwig Manger mentions Knobelsdorff in his "Baugeschichte von Potsdam" (1789/90). After listing 30 pieces of architecture which were realized in Potsdam alone according to his plans, he also writes about Knobelsdorff as a painter: "Although it does not really belong in a history of architecture.—he produced many paintings, all of them directly from nature. He paid attention to every detail which he thought could be of possible future use, and sketched them in his notebook, which he kept in a particular place of his clothing. These drawings are free and easy and dashed off in his own masterly way. [...] The same can also be said of his landscape paintings, because everything in them was painted from nature with a wonderful blending of colors, without being hard or too colorful" (translation).

Fredrick the Great wrote a commemorative address on Knobelsdorff in French and had it read on January 24, 1754, before the Academy of Sciences, to which Knobelsdorff had belonged since 1742 as an honorary member. He referred in it to the tensions which had arisen between the two of them in Knobelsdorff's last years, but made it very clear that he continued to admire him: "Knobelsdorff was on the whole held in high esteem because of his sincere and upright character. He loved the truth and believed it could not harm anyone. Agreeableness he considered to be a constraint and he avoided everything that seemed to restrict his freedom. One had to know him well to fully appreciate his merit. He encouraged young talents, loved artists, and preferred being sought out to putting himself in the forefront. Above all it must be said in his praise that he never confused competition with jealousy, two very different feelings [...]" (translation).

== Chronology of main constructions ==
- 1734 - Apollo tempel in the Amalthea garden in Neuruppin.
- 1737 – Alterations to Rheinsberg Palace (until 1740).f
- 1740 – Plans to rebuild the city of Rheinsberg after it was destroyed by fire. Planning and construction of the Berlin Opera House (until 1743). Extensions for Monbijou Palace in Berlin (until 1742). New wing of Charlottenburg Palace (until 1742, the interior until 1746).
- 1741 – Start of redesign of the Berlin Tiergarten Park.
- 1744 – Work on reconstruction of the Potsdam City Palace (until 1752) and plans for Sanssouci Park.
- 1745 – Proposals for the colonnade of Sanssouci Park. Plans for Sanssouci Palace (completed in 1747).
- 1748 – Plans to rebuild the Dessau Palace (not realized)
- 1749 – Plans for the Marble Hall in the Potsdam City Palace.
- 1751 – Plans for the Deer Garden Colonnade and for the Neptune grotto in Sanssouci Park.
- 1752 – Construction of the French Church in Potsdam.
- 1753 – Plans for the obelisk on the market square of Potsdam and for the Neustadt Gate in Potsdam.
