= Kołatka, Lubusz Voivodeship =

Kołatka
- Village
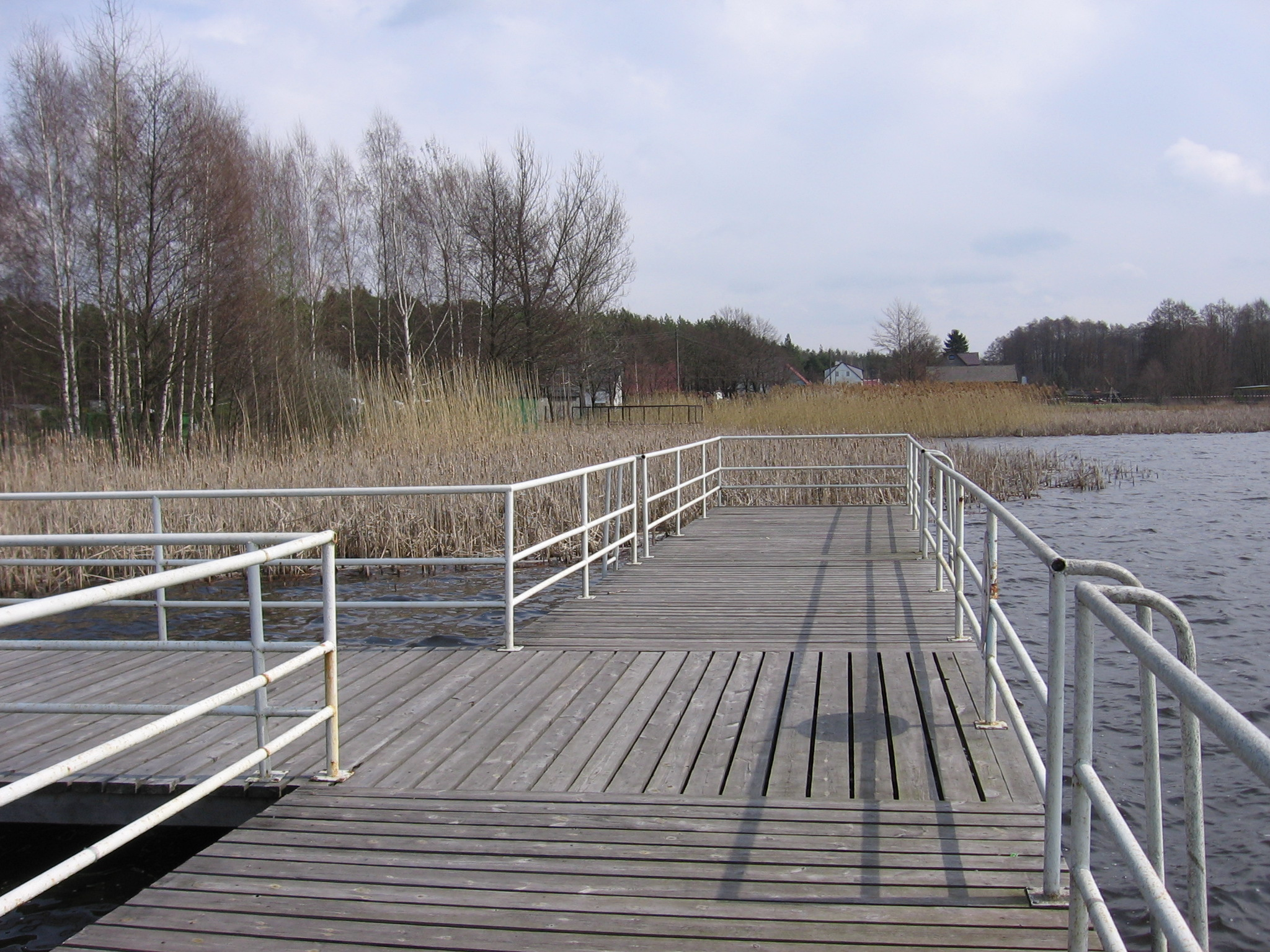

- Location within Poland
- Coordinates: 51°58′32″N 15°00′20″E
- Country: Poland
- Voivodeship: Lubusz
- County: Krosno
- Gmina: Bobrowice
- Population: 10

Kołatka ([kɔˈwatka]; German: Blochbude) is a village in the administrative district of Gmina Bobrowice, within Krosno County, Lubusz Voivodeship, in western Poland.
