= Strużka, Lubusz Voivodeship =

Strużka
- Village
- Location within Poland
- Coordinates: 51°54′23″N 15°03′12″E
- Country: Poland
- Voivodeship: Lubusz
- County: Krosno
- Gmina: Bobrowice
- Population: 131

Strużka ([ˈstruʂka]; German: Seedorf) is a village in the administrative district of Gmina Bobrowice, within Krosno County, Lubusz Voivodeship, in western Poland.
