= Młyniec, Lubusz Voivodeship =

Młyniec
- Village
- Location within Poland
- Coordinates: 51°56′22″N 15°6′20″E
- Country: Poland
- Voivodeship: Lubusz
- County: Krosno
- Gmina: Bobrowice
- Elevation: 65 m (213 ft)
- Population: 2

Młyniec ([ˈmwɨɲɛt͡s]; German: Neumühl) is a village in the administrative district of Gmina Bobrowice, within Krosno County, Lubusz Voivodeship, in western Poland.
