= Lubnica, Lubusz Voivodeship =

Lubnica
- Village
- Location within Poland
- Coordinates: 51°57′45″N 15°6′35″E
- Country: Poland
- Voivodeship: Lubusz
- County: Krosno
- Gmina: Bobrowice
- Population: 5

Lubnica ([lubˈnit͡sa]; German: Leimnitz Vorwerk) is a village in the administrative district of Gmina Bobrowice, within Krosno County, Lubusz Voivodeship, in western Poland.
