= Zabłocie, Greater Poland Voivodeship =

Zabłocie
- Village
- Location within Poland
- Coordinates: 52°15′N 18°47′E
- Country: Poland
- Voivodeship: Greater Poland
- County: Koło
- Gmina: Grzegorzew
- Time zone: UTC+1 (CET)
  - Summer (DST): UTC+2 (CEST)

Zabłocie [zaˈbwɔt͡ɕɛ] is a village in the administrative district of Gmina Grzegorzew, within Koło County, Greater Poland Voivodeship, in central Poland.
