= Dachów =

- Village
- Location within Poland
- Coordinates: 51°54′N 15°5′E
- Country: Poland
- Voivodeship: Lubusz
- County: Krosno
- Gmina: Bobrowice
- Population: 113

Dachów ([ˈdaxuf]; German: Dachow) is a village in the administrative district of Gmina Bobrowice, within Krosno County, Lubusz Voivodeship, in western Poland.
