= Bronkówek =

- Village
- Location within Poland
- Coordinates: 51°56′43″N 14°59′17″E
- Country: Poland
- Voivodeship: Lubusz
- County: Krosno
- Gmina: Bobrowice
- Population: 1

Bronkówek ([brɔnˈkuvɛk]; German: Brankower Theerofen) is a village in the administrative district of Gmina Bobrowice, within Krosno County, Lubusz Voivodeship, in western Poland.
