= Bronków =

- Village
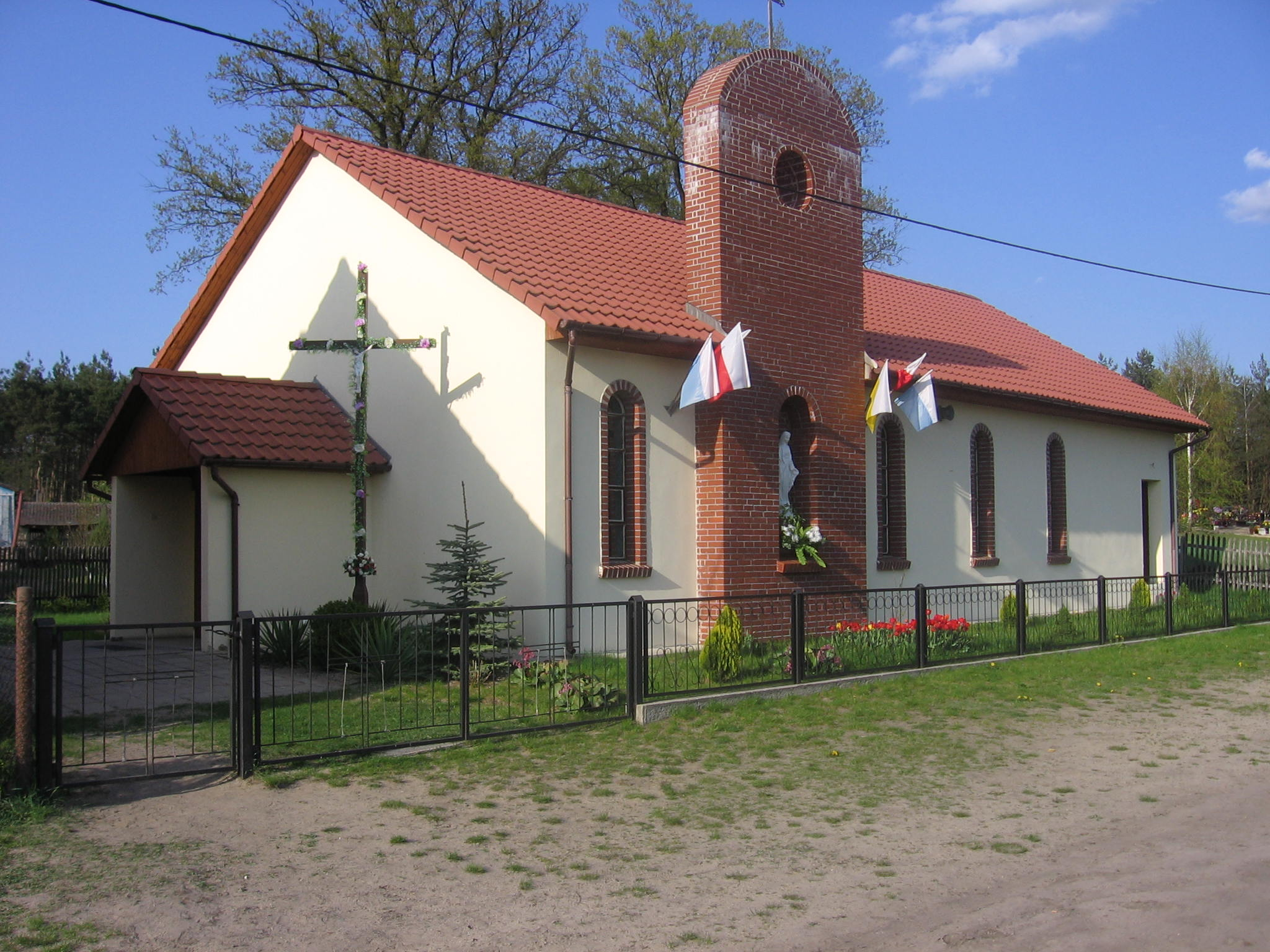
- Chapel

- Location within Poland
- Coordinates: 51°57′0″N 15°0′0″E
- Country: Poland
- Voivodeship: Lubusz
- County: Krosno
- Gmina: Bobrowice
- Population: 320

Bronków ([ˈbrɔnkuf]; German: Brankow) is a village in the administrative district of Gmina Bobrowice, within Krosno County, Lubusz Voivodeship, in western Poland.
