= Janiszowice, Gmina Bobrowice =

Janiszowice
- Village
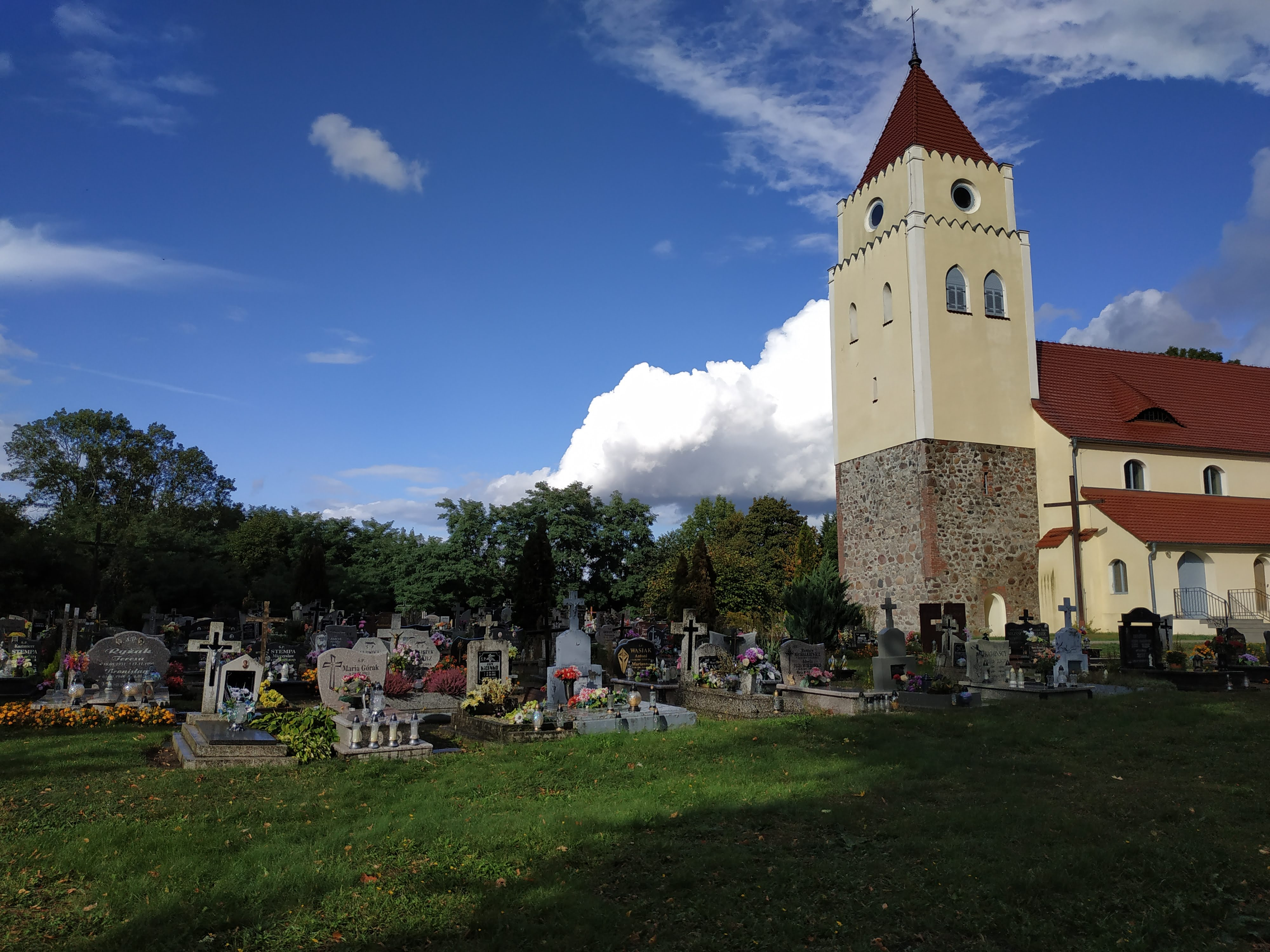
- Janiszowice cemetery

- Location within Poland
- Coordinates: 51°54′33″N 15°02′22″E
- Country: Poland
- Voivodeship: Lubusz
- County: Krosno
- Gmina: Bobrowice
- Population: 156

Janiszowice ([janiʂɔˈvit͡sɛ]; German: Jähnsdorf) is a village in the administrative district of Gmina Bobrowice, within Krosno County, Lubusz Voivodeship, in western Poland.
