= Tarnawa Krośnieńska =

- Village
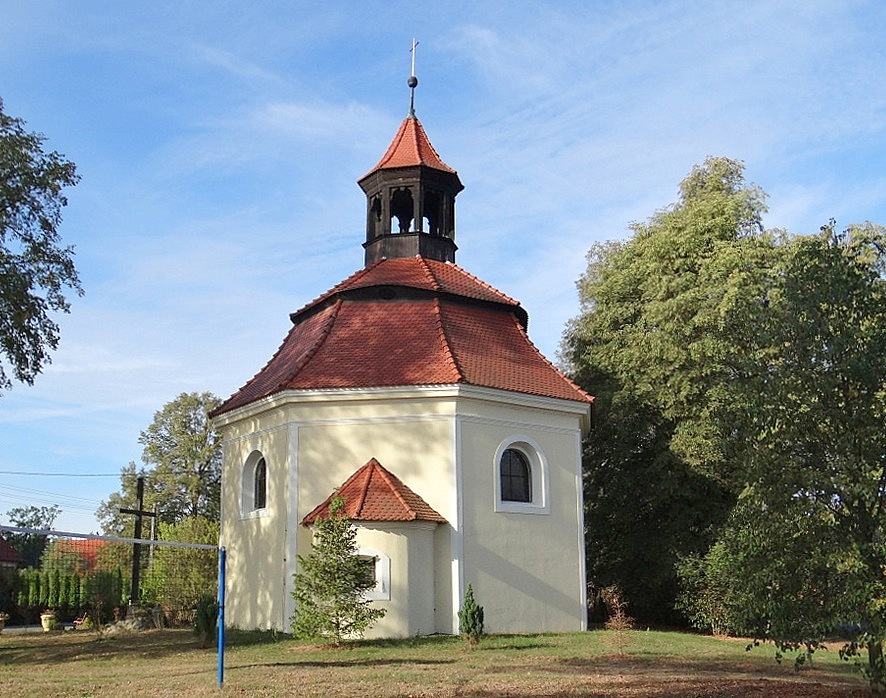
- Catholic church

- Location within Poland
- Coordinates: 51°55′N 15°9′E
- Country: Poland
- Voivodeship: Lubusz
- County: Krosno
- Gmina: Bobrowice
- Population: 45

Tarnawa Krośnieńska ([tarˈnava krɔɕˈɲɛɲska]; German: Tornow) is a village in the administrative district of Gmina Bobrowice, within Krosno County, Lubusz Voivodeship, in western Poland.
