= Gmina Bobrowice =

Gmina Bobrowice Bobrowice Commune
- Gmina
- Flag Coat of arms
- Interactive map of Gmina Bobrowice
- Coordinates (Bobrowice): 51°57′13″N 15°5′5″E
- Country: Poland
- Voivodeship: Lubusz
- County: Krosno
- Seat: Bobrowice

Area
  - Total: 185.05 km^{2} (71.45 sq mi)

Population (2019-06-30)
  - Total: 3,205
  - Density: 17.32/km^{2} (44.86/sq mi)
- Website: https://bobrowice.pl/

Gmina Bobrowice is a rural gmina (administrative district) in Krosno County, Lubusz Voivodeship, in western Poland. Its seat is the village of Bobrowice, which lies approximately 9 kilometres (6 mi) south of Krosno Odrzańskie and 29 km (18 mi) west of Zielona Góra.

The gmina covers an area of 185.05 square kilometres (71.4 sq mi), and as of 2019 its total population is 3,205.

== Villages ==
Gmina Bobrowice contains the villages and settlements of Barłogi, Bobrowice, Bronków, Bronkówek, Brzezinka, Chojnowo, Chromów, Czeklin, Dachów, Dęby, Dychów, Janiszowice, Kołatka, Kukadło, Lubnica, Młyniec, Prądocinek, Przychów, Strużka, Tarnawa Krośnieńska, Wełmice and Żarków.

== Neighbouring gminas ==
Gmina Bobrowice is bordered by the gminas of Dąbie, Gubin, Krosno Odrzańskie, Lubsko and Nowogród Bobrzański.
