= Prądocinek =

- Village
- Location within Poland
- Coordinates: 51°59′22″N 15°3′59″E
- Country: Poland
- Voivodeship: Lubusz
- County: Krosno
- Gmina: Bobrowice
- Population: 66

Prądocinek ([prɔndɔˈt͡ɕinɛk]; German: Neubrück) is a village in the administrative district of Gmina Bobrowice, within Krosno County, Lubusz Voivodeship, in western Poland.
