= Grzegorzew =

- Village
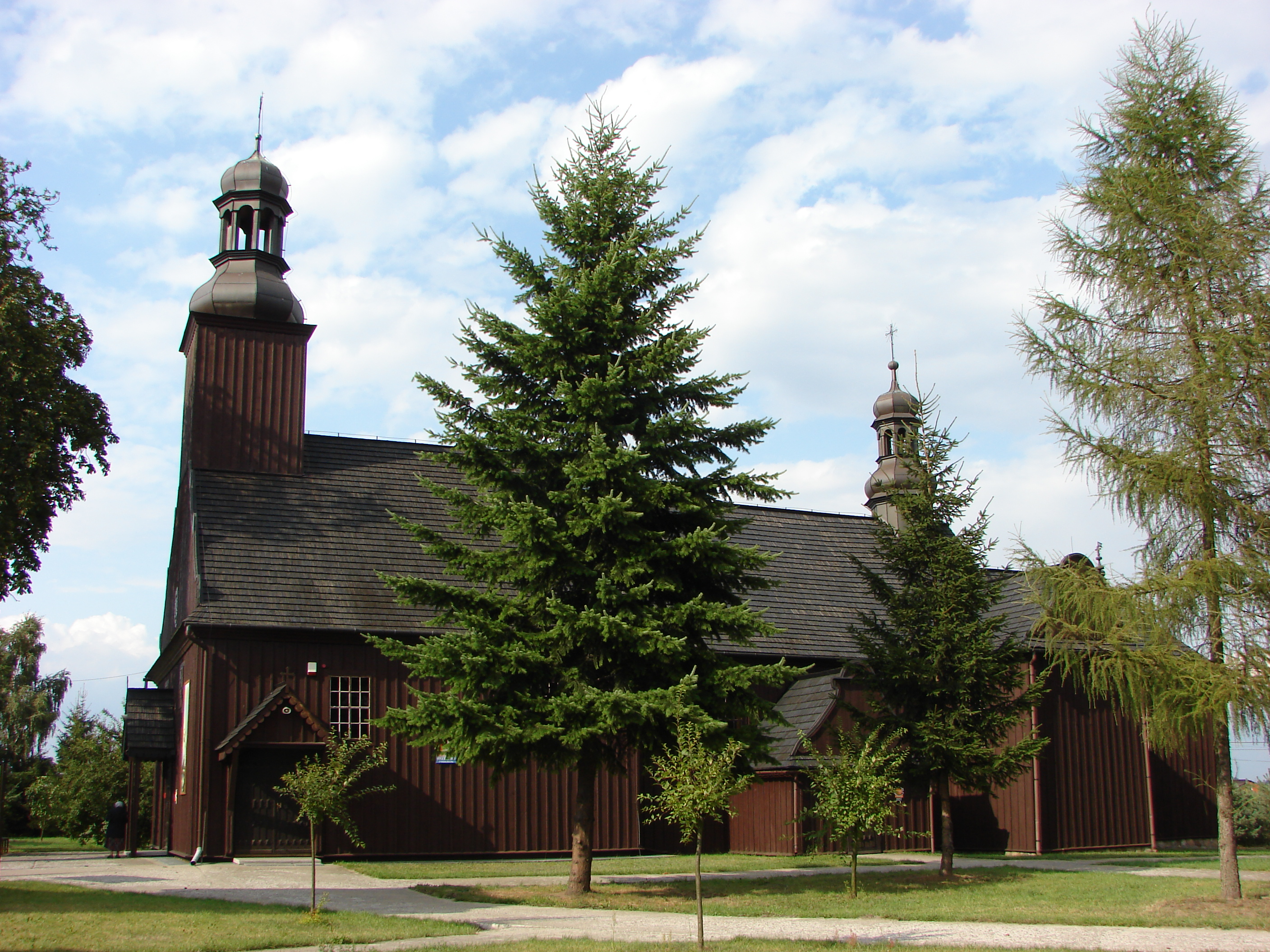
- Wooden church of the Assumption of the Blessed Virgin Mary from 1776.

- Location within Poland
- Coordinates: 52°12′N 18°44′E
- Country: Poland
- Voivodeship: Greater Poland
- County: Koło
- Gmina: Grzegorzew

Population
  - Total: 1,650
- Time zone: UTC+1 (CET)
  - Summer (DST): UTC+2 (CEST)
- Vehicle registration: PKL
- Website: http://www.grzegorzew.nowoczesnagmina.pl

Grzegorzew [ɡʐɛˈɡɔʐɛf] is a village in Koło County, Greater Poland Voivodeship, in central Poland. It is the seat of the gmina (administrative district) called Gmina Grzegorzew. It is located in the Łęczyca Land.

It was a private church town, administratively located in the Łęczyca County in the Łęczyca Voivodeship in the Greater Poland Province of the Kingdom of Poland.
