= Brzezinka, Gmina Bobrowice =

Brzezinka
- Village
- Location within Poland
- Coordinates: 51°58′47″N 15°2′32″E
- Country: Poland
- Voivodeship: Lubusz
- County: Krosno
- Gmina: Bobrowice
- Population: 46
- Time zone: UTC+1 (CET)
  - Summer (DST): UTC+2 (CEST)
- Vehicle registration: FKR

Brzezinka (Polish: [bʐɛˈʑiŋka]; German: Klein Deichow) is a village in the administrative district of Gmina Bobrowice, within Krosno County, Lubusz Voivodeship, in western Poland.
