= Chojnowo, Lubusz Voivodeship =

Chojnowo
- Village
- Location within Poland
- Coordinates: 51°55′N 15°7′E
- Country: Poland
- Voivodeship: Lubusz
- County: Krosno
- Gmina: Bobrowice
- Population: 73

Chojnowo ([xɔi̯ˈnɔvɔ]; German: Kunow) is a village in the administrative district of Gmina Bobrowice, within Krosno County, Lubusz Voivodeship, in western Poland.
