= Chojnica, Wałcz County =

Chojnice
- Settlement
- Location within Poland
- Coordinates: 53°21′39″N 16°06′43″E
- Country: Poland
- Voivodeship: West Pomeranian
- County: Wałcz
- Gmina: Mirosławiec
- Population: 0

Chojnica, formerly known as Kolonia Chojnice ([kɔˈlɔɲa xɔi̯ˈnit͡sɛ]), is a former settlement in the administrative district of Gmina Mirosławiec, within Wałcz County, West Pomeranian Voivodeship, in north-western Poland.

For the history of the region, see History of Pomerania.
