= Barłogi, Lubusz Voivodeship =

Barłogi
- Village
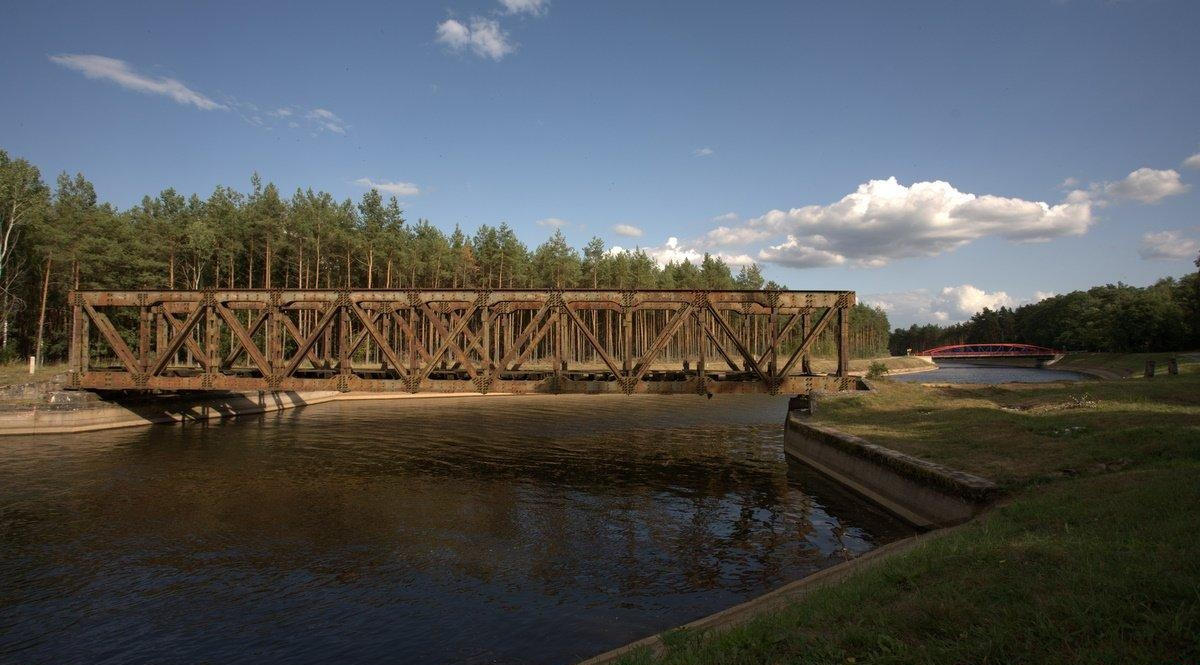

- Location within Poland
- Coordinates: 51°56′11″N 15°5′6″E
- Country: Poland
- Voivodeship: Lubusz
- County: Krosno
- Gmina: Bobrowice
- Population: 85

Barłogi ([barˈwɔɡi]; German: Berloge) is a village in the administrative district of Gmina Bobrowice, within Krosno County, Lubusz Voivodeship, in western Poland.
