= Bylice, Greater Poland Voivodeship =

Bylice
- Village
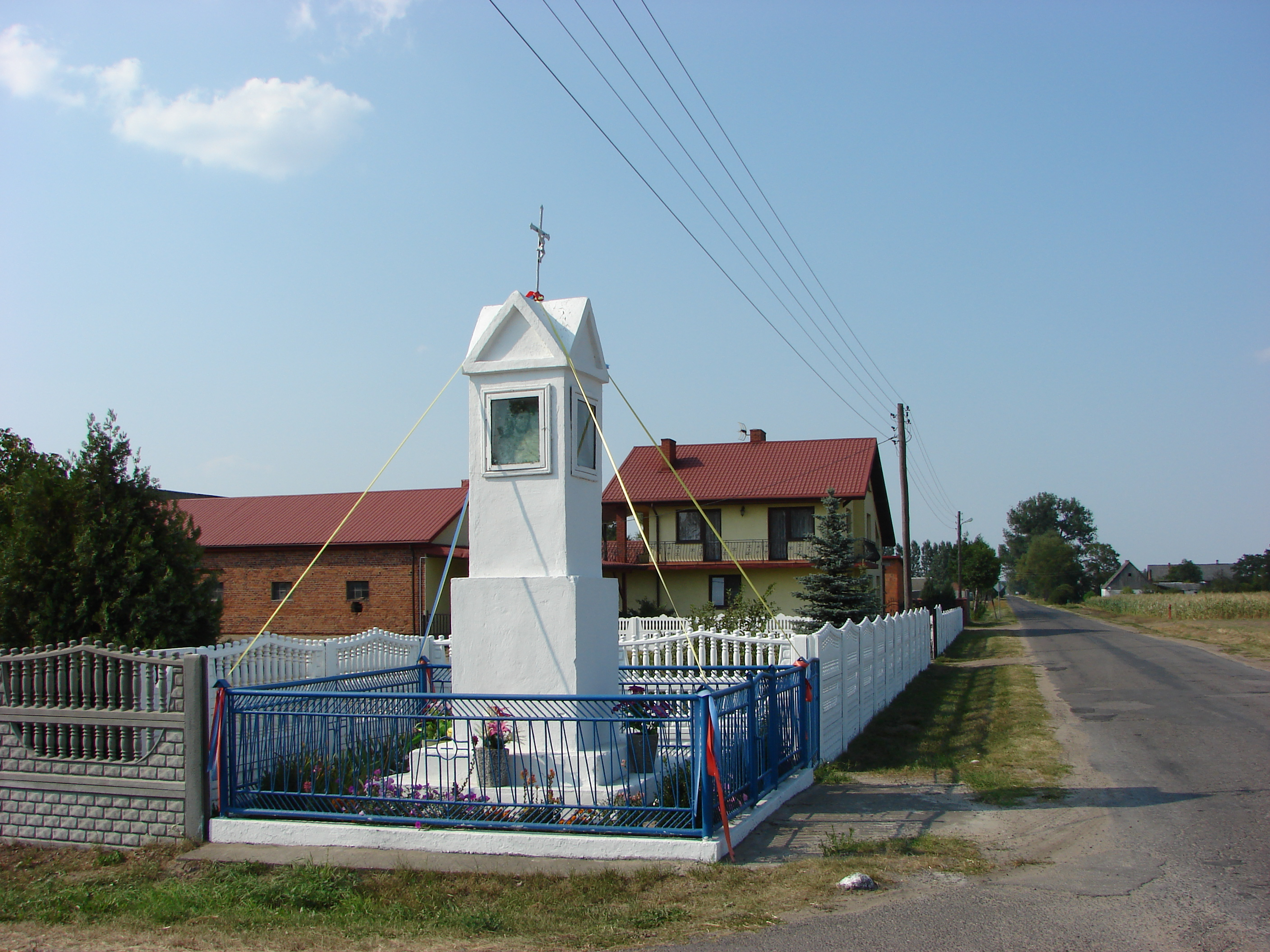
- The wayside shrine

- Location within Poland
- Coordinates: 52°16′N 18°47′E
- Country: Poland
- Voivodeship: Greater Poland
- County: Koło
- Gmina: Grzegorzew
- Time zone: UTC+1 (CET)
  - Summer (DST): UTC+2 (CEST)
- Vehicle registration: PKL

Bylice [bɨˈlit͡sɛ] is a village in the administrative district of Gmina Grzegorzew, within Koło County, Greater Poland Voivodeship, in central Poland.
