= Chojnica, Choszczno County =

Hamlet in Choszczno County, West Pomeranian Voivodeship, Poland

Chojnica
- Hamlet
- Location within Poland
- Coordinates: 53°07′21.21″N 15°39′04.64″E
- Country: Poland
- Voivodeship: West Pomeranian
- County: Choszczno
- Municipality: Bierzwnik
- Time zone: UTC+1 (CET)
  - Summer (DST): UTC+2 (CEST)
- Postal code: 73-240
- Area code: +48 95
- Car plates: ZCH

Chojnica (Polish: [xɔjˈɲi.t͡sa]), also known as Chojnowo (Polish: [xɔjˈnɔ.vɔ]), is a hamlet in West Pomeranian Voivodeship, Poland, located within the municipality of Bierzwnik in Choszczno County.
