= Dobra =

Dobra may refer to:

== People ==
- Alexandru Dobra (1794–1870), Romanian Greek Catholic hierarch
- Anica Dobra (born 1963), Serbian actress and singer
- Armando Dobra (born 2001), British football player
- Rifo Dobra (born 1952), Albanian photographer from Kosovo
- Kaan Dobra (born 1972), former Polish professional footballer and assistant manager at Beşiktaş

== Places ==
=== Croatia ===
- Donja Dobra, a village near Skrad
- Gornja Dobra, Croatia, a village near Skrad
- Dobro (Istria), in the hamlet-port Koromačno

=== Czech Republic ===
- Dobrá, Frýdek-Místek, Moravian-Silesian Region

=== India ===
- Dobra, Bhopal, Madhya Pradesh
- Dobra, Rajasthan

=== Poland ===
- Dobra, Poznań County, Greater Poland Voivodeship
- Dobra, Turek County, Greater Poland Voivodeship
- Dobra, Lesser Poland Voivodeship
- Dobra, Łask County, Łódź Voivodeship
- Dobra, Zgierz County, Łódź Voivodeship
- Dobra, Bolesławiec County, Lower Silesian Voivodeship
- Dobra, Oleśnica County, Lower Silesian Voivodeship
- Dobra, Lubusz Voivodeship
- Dobra, Masovian Voivodeship
- Dobra, Opole Voivodeship
- Dobra, Pomeranian Voivodeship
- Dobra, Przeworsk County, Subcarpathian Voivodeship
- Dobra, Sanok County, Subcarpathian Voivodeship
- Dobra, Silesian Voivodeship
- Dobra, Świętokrzyskie Voivodeship
- Dobra, Łobez County, West Pomeranian Voivodeship
- Dobra, Police County, West Pomeranian Voivodeship

=== Romania ===
- Dobra, Dâmbovița
- Dobra, Hunedoara
- Dobra, a village in Șugag, Alba County
- Dobra, a village in Bălăcița, Mehedinţi County
- Dobra, a village in Papiu Ilarian, Mureș County
- Dobra, a village in Supur, Satu Mare County

=== Serbia ===
- Dobra (Golubac)

=== Slovakia ===
- Dobrá, Trebišov District, Košice Region

=== United States ===
- Dobra, West Virginia

== Rivers ==
- Dobra (Kupa), a river in central Croatia
- Dobra (Sella), a river in the Amieva district of Asturias, Spain
- Dobra (Mureș), a river in Hunedoara County, Romania
- Dobra (Sebeș), a river in Sibiu and Alba Counties, Romania
- Dobra, a tributary of the Lișava in Caraș-Severin County, Romania
- Dobra, a tributary of the Valea Caselor in Sibiu County, Romania
- Dobra, a tributary of the Lotru in Vâlcea County, Romania

== Other uses ==
- Battle of Dobra (1863)
- São Tomé and Príncipe dobra, the currency of São Tomé and Príncipe

== See also ==
- Döbra (disambiguation)
- Dobrá (disambiguation)
- Dobra Bridge (disambiguation)
- Dobre (disambiguation)
- Dobro (disambiguation)
- Gmina Dobra (disambiguation)
