= Prempura =

Prempura may refer to the following places in India:

- Prempura, Bhopal (census code 482424), a village near Bhadbhadaghat railway station in Huzur tehsil
- Prempura, Bhopal (census code 482362), a village near Bhopal Airport in Huzur tehsil
- Prempura, Kaithal, a village in Haryana
- Village Prempura, Lalsot, Dausa, Rajsthan

== See also ==
- Prem Pura, a village in Phagwara tehsil
