= Döbra =

Döbra may refer to:

- Döbrabach (other name Döbra), a river of Bavaria, Germany, tributary of the Selbitz
- Döbra, Namibia, a mountain and a homonymous settlement in Namibia
- Döbra (Schwarzenbach am Wald), a district of the town Schwarzenbach am Wald in Bavaria, Germany

== See also ==
- Dobra (disambiguation)
- Dobrá (disambiguation)
