= Bătrâna (disambiguation) =

Bătrâna may refer to the following places in Romania:

- Bătrâna, a commune in Hunedoara County
- Bătrâna, a tributary of the Bâlta in Gorj County
- Bătrâna, an alternative name of the river Valea Boului in Buzău and Brăila Counties
- Bătrâna, a name for the upper course of the Dobra in Hunedoara County
- Bătrâna (Someșul Cald), a tributary of the Someșul Cald in Bihor and Cluj Counties
- Bătrâna (Râul Târgului), a tributary of the Râul Târgului in Argeș County
- Bătrâna, a tributary of the Sadu in Sibiu County

== See also ==
- Bătrânești (disambiguation)
