= Grzęzno =

- Village
- Location within Poland
- Coordinates: 53°33′N 15°16′E
- Country: Poland
- Voivodeship: West Pomeranian
- County: Łobez
- Gmina: Dobra

Grzęzno [ˈɡʐɛ̃znɔ] (German: Weitenhagen) is a village in the administrative district of Gmina Dobra, within Łobez County, West Pomeranian Voivodeship, in north-western Poland. It lies approximately 5 km (3 mi) south-west of Dobra, 25 km (16 mi) west of Łobez, and 48 km (30 mi) east of the regional capital Szczecin.
