= Zapłocie =

- Village
- Location within Poland
- Coordinates: 53°33′17″N 15°20′15″E
- Country: Poland
- Voivodeship: West Pomeranian
- County: Łobez
- Gmina: Dobra

Zapłocie [zaˈpwɔt͡ɕɛ] (German: Hospitalvorwerk) is a village in the administrative district of Gmina Dobra, within Łobez County, West Pomeranian Voivodeship, in north-western Poland. It lies approximately 2 km (1 mi) south-east of Dobra, 21 km (13 mi) south-west of Łobez, and 53 km (33 mi) east of the regional capital Szczecin.
