= Wojtaszyce =

- Village
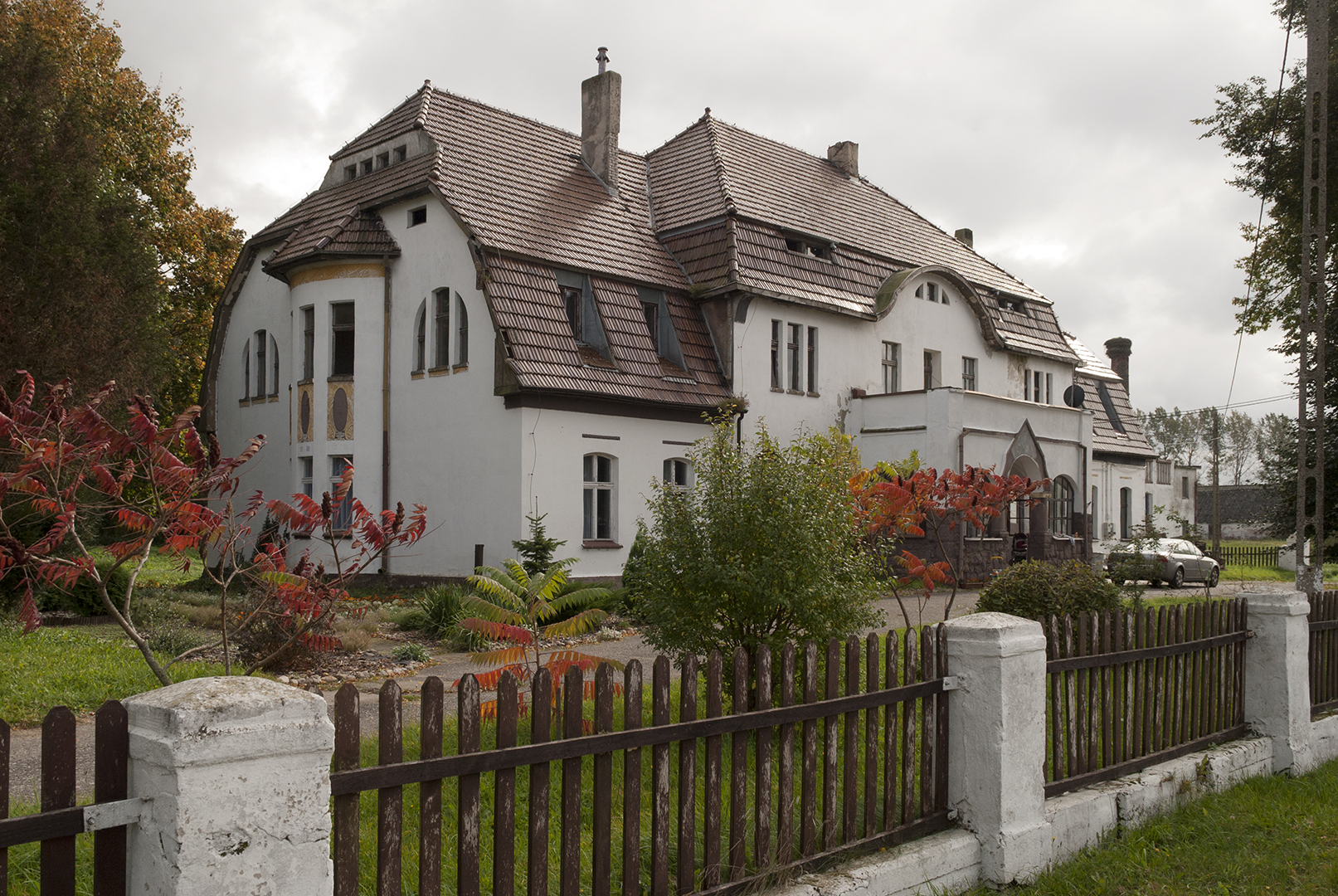
- Manor house

- Location within Poland
- Coordinates: 53°33′N 15°11′E
- Country: Poland
- Voivodeship: West Pomeranian
- County: Łobez
- Gmina: Dobra

Wojtaszyce [vɔi̯taˈʂɨt͡sɛ] (German: Voigtshagen) is a village in the administrative district of Gmina Dobra, within Łobez County, West Pomeranian Voivodeship, in north-western Poland. It lies approximately 9 km (6 mi) south-west of Dobra, 31 km (19 mi) west of Łobez, and 43 km (27 mi) east of the regional capital Szczecin.
