= Vijenac ambush =

1995 attack in Bosnia and Herzegovina

- Part of Bosnian War
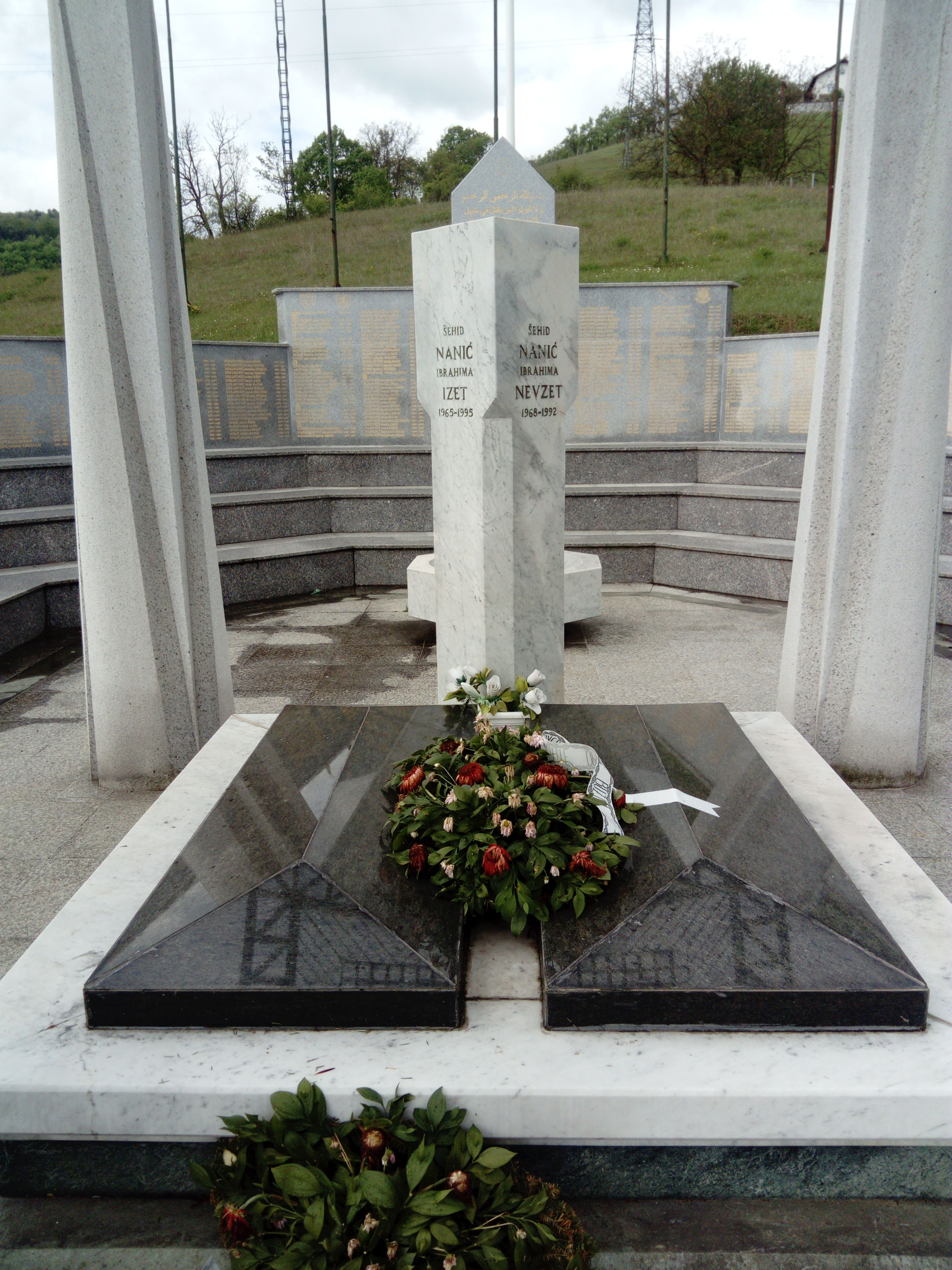
Date	5 August 1995
Location	Vijenac, Ćorkovača, Dobro Selo, Bosnia and Herzegovina
Result	Serbian victory: Bosniak offensive temporarily halted

Belligerents
Unknown Serbian unit	Army of the Republic of Bosnia and Herzegovina

Commanders and leaders
Unknown	(Bosnia and Herzegovina) Izet Nanić †

Strength
10-15 Soldiers	Unknown

Casualties and losses
None	9 Killed

The Vijenac ambush happened on 5. August 1995 and was a coordinated attack by the Army of Republika Srpska during Operation Storm to attack ARBiH troops.

During the engagement, ARBiH Brigadier General Izet Nanić and several of his soldiers were killed bei the Army of Republika Srpska, just days before the end of the war in the region.

== Background ==
On early August 1995 ARBiH began their offensive on the Western-Bosnian battlegrounds, in coordination with Croatian Armed Forces. One of the main goals was connecting with Croatian Units at the municipality of Dvor.

== Ambush ==
While the 505th Brigade was moving towards the Vijenac area, the unit fell into an ambush prepared by the VRS. In the surprise attack, commander Izet Nanić was killed, along with several companions. The ambush, according to analyses and war documents, was well-prepared and represents one of the rare tactical victories of Army of Republika Srpska over the elite units of the 5th Corps in the final phase of the war.

== Consequences ==
The loss of Izet Nanić left deep consequences onto the moral and commanding structure of the 505th Bužim Brigade. Despite of his death the brigade continued their operations until end of the war.
