= Krzemienna, West Pomeranian Voivodeship =

Krzemienna
- Village
- Location within Poland
- Coordinates: 53°34′N 15°14′E
- Country: Poland
- Voivodeship: West Pomeranian
- County: Łobez
- Gmina: Dobra
- Population: 340

Krzemienna [kʂɛˈmjɛnna] (German: Kramonshof) is a village in the administrative district of Gmina Dobra, within Łobez County, West Pomeranian Voivodeship, in north-western Poland. It lies approximately 6 km (4 mi) west of Dobra, 27 km (17 mi) west of Łobez, and 47 km (29 mi) east of the regional capital Szczecin.

The village has a population of 340.
