= Dobro Selo =

Dobro Selo, which translates as Good Village from Serbo-Croatian, may refer to:

- Dobro Selo (Bosanski Petrovac), a village in the municipality of Bosanski Petrovac, Bosnia and Herzegovina
- Dobro Selo, Bužim, a village in the municipality of Bužim, Bosnia and Herzegovina
- Dobro Selo (Čitluk), a village in the municipality of Čitluk, Bosnia and Herzegovina
- Dobro Selo, Visoko, a village in the municipality of Visoko, Bosnia and Herzegovina
- Dobroselo, a village in the municipality of Donji Lapac, Croatia
