= Bienice =

- Village
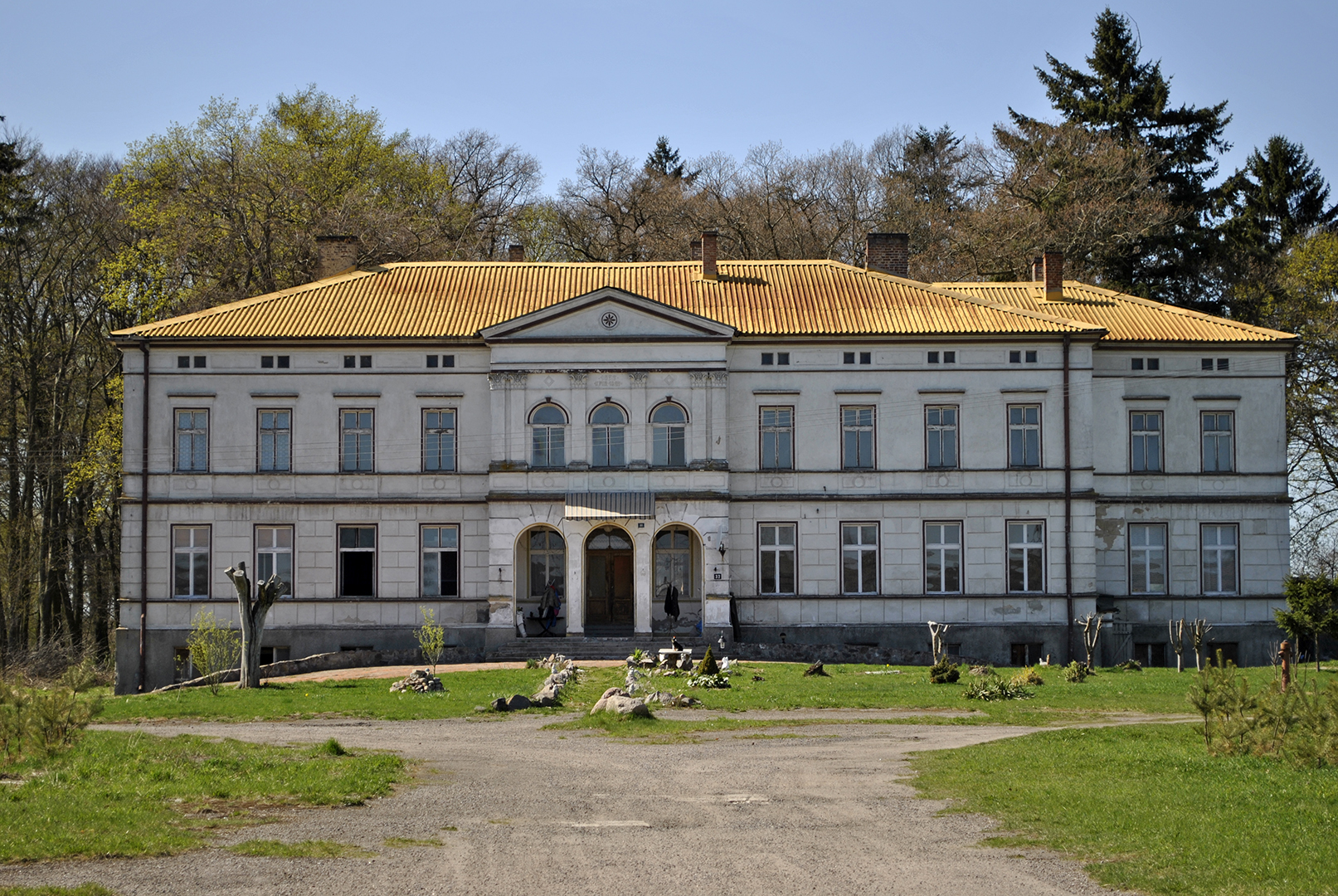
- Bienice Palace

- Location within Poland
- Coordinates: 53°36′N 15°18′E
- Country: Poland
- Voivodeship: West Pomeranian
- County: Łobez
- Gmina: Dobra
- Time zone: UTC+1 (CET)
  - Summer (DST): UTC+2 (CEST)
- Vehicle registration: ZLO

Bienice [bjɛˈnit͡sɛ] is a village in the administrative district of Gmina Dobra, within Łobez County, West Pomeranian Voivodeship, in north-western Poland. It lies approximately 2 km (1 mi) north of Dobra, 22 km (14 mi) west of Łobez, and 52 km (32 mi) north-east of the regional capital Szczecin.
