= Dobropole =

Dobropole may refer to the following places:

- Dobropole, Gryfino County in West Pomeranian Voivodeship (north-west Poland)
- Dobropole, Kamień County in West Pomeranian Voivodeship (north-west Poland)
- Dobropole, Łobez County in West Pomeranian Voivodeship (north-west Poland)
- Dobropole, Ternopil Oblast in Chortkiv Raion, Ternopil Oblast, Ukraine
- Dobropillia, Donetsk Oblast, Ukraine
