= Tucze =

- Village
- Location within Poland
- Coordinates: 53°32′N 15°21′E
- Country: Poland
- Voivodeship: West Pomeranian
- County: Łobez
- Gmina: Dobra

Tucze [ˈtut͡ʂɛ] (German: Braunsberg) is a village in the administrative district of Gmina Dobra, within Łobez County, West Pomeranian Voivodeship, in north-western Poland. It lies approximately 7 km (4 mi) south-east of Dobra, 21 km (13 mi) south-west of Łobez, and 53 km (33 mi) east of the regional capital Szczecin.
