= Dobro (disambiguation) =

Dobro is an American brand of resonator guitars owned by Gibson and manufactured by its subsidiary Epiphone.

Dobro may also refer to:

- Genericized trademark used to refer to any resonator guitar
- Dobro (Livno), a village in the municipality of Livno, Bosnia and Herzegovina
- DoBro, short for Downtown Brooklyn
- Carrie Dobro (born 1957), American actress
- The acrophonic name of the letter De (Cyrillic) in the old Russian alphabet
- Dobro (Istria), a hamlet in Croatia

== See also ==
- Dobra (disambiguation)
- Drobo, a computer data storage device
- Dobro Polje (disambiguation)
- Dobro Selo (disambiguation)
