= Błądkowo =

- Village
- Location within Poland
- Coordinates: 53°36′N 15°14′E
- Country: Poland
- Voivodeship: West Pomeranian
- County: Łobez
- Gmina: Dobra

Błądkowo [bwɔntˈkɔvɔ] (German: Plantikow) is a village in the administrative district of Gmina Dobra, within Łobez County, West Pomeranian Voivodeship, in north-western Poland. It lies approximately 6 km (4 mi) west of Dobra, 26 km (16 mi) west of Łobez, and 48 km (30 mi) north-east of the regional capital Szczecin.
