= Grzęzienko =

- Village
- Location within Poland
- Coordinates: 53°34′12″N 15°15′38″E
- Country: Poland
- Voivodeship: West Pomeranian
- County: Łobez
- Gmina: Dobra

Grzęzienko [ɡʐɛ̃ˈʑɛnkɔ] (German: Weitenhagen) is a village in the administrative district of Gmina Dobra, within Łobez County, West Pomeranian Voivodeship, in north-western Poland. It lies approximately 4 km (2 mi) south-west of Dobra, 25 km (16 mi) west of Łobez, and 48 km (30 mi) east of the regional capital Szczecin.
