= Dobrá =

Dobrá may refer to:

- Dobrá (Frýdek-Místek District), a municipality and village in the Moravian-Silesian Region, Czech Republic
- Dobrá, Trebišov District, a municipality and village in the Košice Region, Slovakia
- Simona Dobrá, Czech tennis player

== See also ==
- Dobra (disambiguation)
- Döbra (disambiguation)
