= Döbrabach =

River in Germany

Location
- Country: Germany
- State: Bavaria

Physical characteristics
- Source
  - location: at the village Döbra, a district of Schwarzenbach am Wald
  - elevation: about 660 metres (2,170 ft)
- Mouth
  - location: south of the village Weidesgrün, a district of Selbitz
  - coordinates: 50°17′40″N 11°44′25″E
  - elevation: about 515 metres (1,690 ft)
- Length: 6.3 km (3.9 mi)

Basin features
- Progression: Selbitz→ Saale→ Elbe→ North Sea

Döbrabach (also Döbra) is a small river of Bavaria, Germany.

The Döbrabach source is at the village of Döbra (district of the town Schwarzenbach am Wald) at the foot of the Döbraberg in the Franconian Forest. It passes through the village of Marlesreuth (district of Naila) and flows south of the village Weidesgrün (district of Selbitz) into the river Selbitz.

The creek was first mentioned on April 28, 1386, when the castle Veste Schauenstein was sold to Frederick V, Burgrave of Nuremberg.

The Döbrabach is the name given to both the village Döbra and the mountain Döbraberg.

== See also ==
- List of rivers of Bavaria
