= Prempura, Bhopal (census code 482362) =

Prempura
- village
- Location within Madhya Pradesh Location within India
- Coordinates: 23.34012806°N 77.34497309°E
- Country: India
- State: Madhya Pradesh
- District: Bhopal
- Tehsil: Huzur
- Elevation: 492 m (1,614 ft)

Population (2011)
  - Total: 16
- Time zone: UTC+5:30 (IST)
- ISO 3166 code: MP-IN
- 2011 census code: 482362

Prempura is a village in the Bhopal district of Madhya Pradesh, India. It is located in the Huzur tehsil and the Phanda block. It is situated near Dobra, around 8 km from the Raja Bhoj Airport.

== Demographics ==
According to the 2011 census of India, Prempura has 3 households. The effective literacy rate (i.e. the literacy rate of population excluding children aged 6 and below) is 36.36%.

Demographics (2011 Census)
	Total	Male	Female
Population	16	7	9
Children aged below 6 years	5	2	3
Scheduled caste	16	7	9
Scheduled tribe	0	0	0
Literates	4	3	1
Workers (all)	9	5	4
Main workers (total)	9	5	4
Main workers: Cultivators	0	0	0
Main workers: Agricultural labourers	9	5	4
Main workers: Household industry workers	0	0	0
Main workers: Other	0	0	0
Marginal workers (total)	0	0	0
Marginal workers: Cultivators	0	0	0
Marginal workers: Agricultural labourers	0	0	0
Marginal workers: Household industry workers	0	0	0
Marginal workers: Others	0	0	0
Non-workers	7	2	5
