= Gmina Dobra =

Gmina Dobra may refer to any of the following administrative districts in Poland:

- Gmina Dobra, Lesser Poland Voivodeship
- Gmina Dobra, Łobez County
- Gmina Dobra, Police County
- Gmina Dobra, Greater Poland Voivodeship
