= Wrześno =

- Village
- Location within Poland
- Coordinates: 53°34′12″N 15°10′30″E
- Country: Poland
- Voivodeship: West Pomeranian
- County: Łobez
- Gmina: Dobra

Wrześno [ˈvʐɛɕnɔ] (German: Gutendorf) is a village in the administrative district of Gmina Dobra, within Łobez County, West Pomeranian Voivodeship, in north-western Poland.
