= Dobro Polje (disambiguation) =

Dobro Polje can also refer to:

- Dobro Polje, a village in the municipality of Kalinovik, Republika Srpska, Bosnia and Herzegovina
- Dobro Polje, Radovljica, a settlement on the left bank of the Sava River in the Municipality of Radovljica, Slovenia
- Dobro Polje, Ilirska Bistrica, a small settlement west of Ilirska Bistrica in the Inner Carniola region of Slovenia
- Dobro Polje (Crna Trava), a village in the municipality of Crna Trava, Serbia
- Dobro Polje (Boljevac), a village in the municipality of Boljevac, Serbia
- Dobro Pole or Dóbro Pólie, a peak on border between North Macedonia and Greece
- Battle of Dobro Pole, a World War I battle, fought on 15 September 1918

== See also ==
- Dobro (disambiguation)
