= Ciorman =

- Location within Romania

Location
- Country: Romania
- Counties: Hunedoara County
- Villages: Răchițaua, Piatra

Physical characteristics
- Source: Poiana Ruscă Mountains
- Mouth: Dobra
  - coordinates: 45.8119°N 22.6391°E
- Length: 8 km (5.0 mi)
- Basin size: 18 km^{2} (6.9 sq mi)

Basin features
- Progression: Dobra→ Mureș→ Tisza→ Danube→ Black Sea
- Tributaries
  - left: Valea Cornetului

The Ciorman is a left tributary of the river Dobra in Romania. It flows into the Dobra near Bătrâna. Its length is 8 km (5.0 mi) and its basin size is 18 km^{2} (6.9 sq mi).
