= Anielino =

- Village
- Location within Poland
- Coordinates: 53°33′24″N 15°13′4″E
- Country: Poland
- Voivodeship: West Pomeranian
- County: Łobez
- Gmina: Dobra

Anielino [aɲɛˈlinɔ] (German: Dorotheenhof) is a village in the administrative district of Gmina Dobra, within Łobez County, West Pomeranian Voivodeship, in north-western Poland.
