= Dobropole, Łobez County =

Dobropole
- Village
- Location within Poland
- Coordinates: 53°31′55″N 15°18′54″E
- Country: Poland
- Voivodeship: West Pomeranian
- County: Łobez
- Gmina: Dobra
- Population: 360

Dobropole [dɔbrɔˈpɔlɛ] (German: Breitenfeld) is a village in the administrative district of Gmina Dobra, within Łobez County, West Pomeranian Voivodeship, in north-western Poland. It lies approximately 5 km (3 mi) south of Dobra, 22 km (14 mi) south-west of Łobez, and 59 km (37 mi) east of the regional capital Szczecin.

The village has a population of 351.
