= Bătrâna =

- Commune
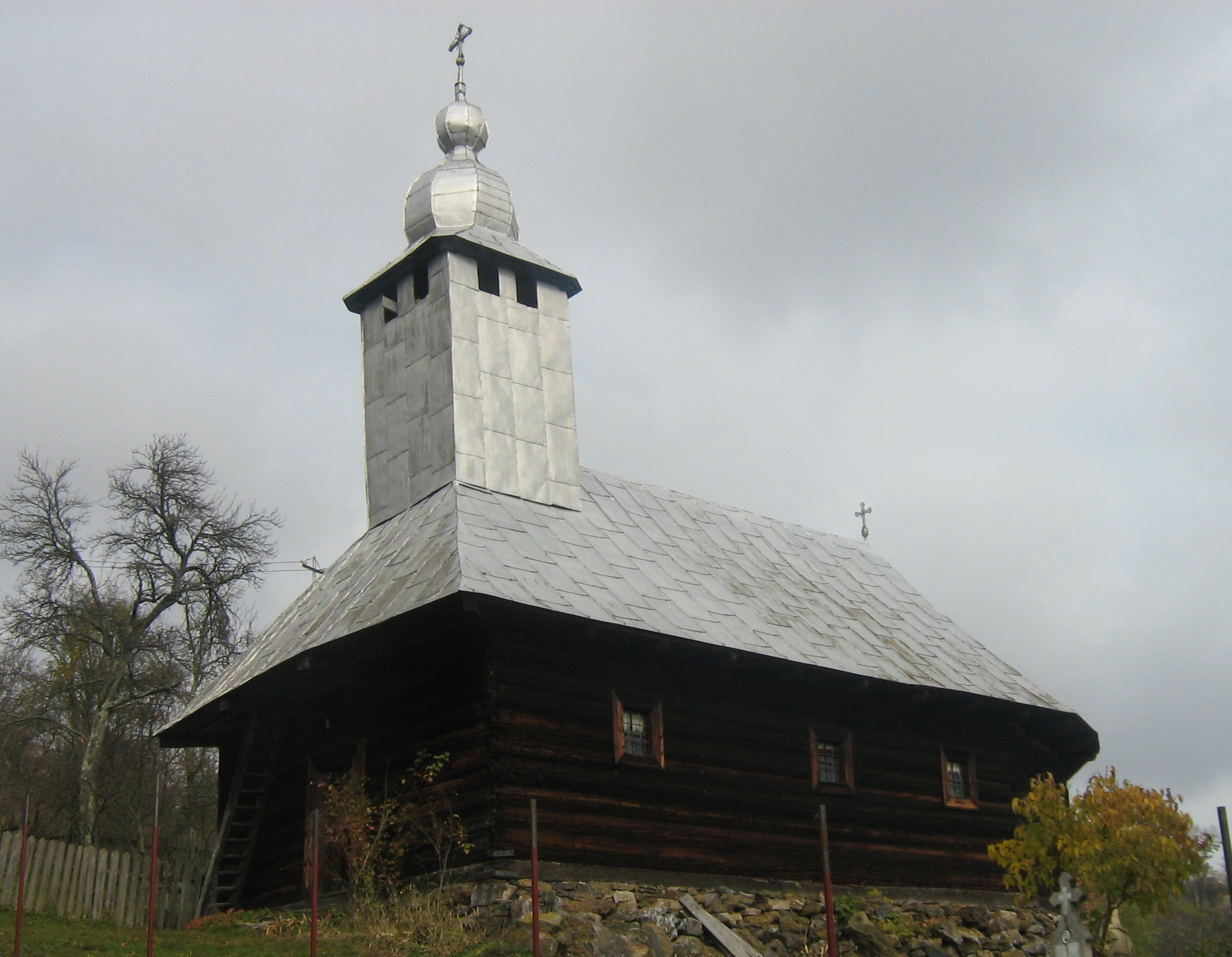
- Wooden Orthodox church in Bătrâna village

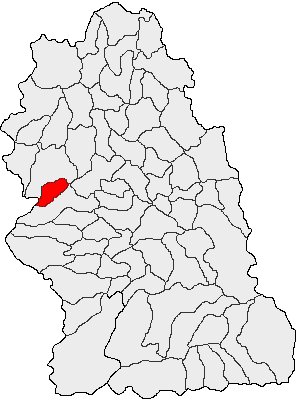
- Location in Hunedoara County

- Location in Romania
- Coordinates: 45°47′N 22°35′E
- Country: Romania
- County: Hunedoara

Government
  - Mayor (2024–2028): Ciprian-Sergiu Pascotesc (PSD)
- Area: 29.6 km^{2} (11.4 sq mi)
- Elevation: 960 m (3,150 ft)
- Population (2021-12-01): 88
  - Density: 3.0/km^{2} (7.7/sq mi)
- Time zone: UTC+02:00 (EET)
  - Summer (DST): UTC+03:00 (EEST)
- Postal code: 337045
- Area code: +40 254
- Vehicle reg.: HD
- Website: primaria-batrina.ro

Bătrâna (Romanian pronunciation: [ˈbətrɨna]; Hungarian: Batrina, German: Altendorf) is a commune in Hunedoara County, Transylvania, Romania. It is composed of four villages: Bătrâna, Fața Roșie, Piatra, and Răchițaua.

Historical population
Year	Pop.	±%
1850	640	—
1910	725	+13.3%
2002	175	−75.9%
2011	127	−27.4%
2021	88	−30.7%
Source: Census data

As per the 2022 census, the commune had 88 inhabitants, making it the smallest Romanian commune in terms of population.

== Geography ==
Bătrâna is located in the western part of Hunedoara County, about 53 km (33 mi) southwest of the county seat, Deva, on the border with Timiș County. It is situated in the Poiana Ruscă Mountains, with its villages positioned on mountain ridges at altitudes ranging from 804 m (Fața Roșie) to 964 m (Bătrâna).

The commune is home to the Codrii seculari pe Valea Dobrișoarei și Prisloapei nature reserve, a protected forest area covering 139.3 hectares. The river Ciorman flows through the Răchițaua and Piatra villages, discharging into the river Dobra near Bătrâna.
