= Bătrânești =

Bătrâneşti may refer to several villages in Romania:

- Bătrâneşti, a village in Gorbănești Commune, Botoşani County
- Bătrâneşti, a village in Icușești Commune, Neamţ County

== See also ==
- Bătrâna River (disambiguation)
