= Battle of Dobra (1863) =

- Part of the January Uprising
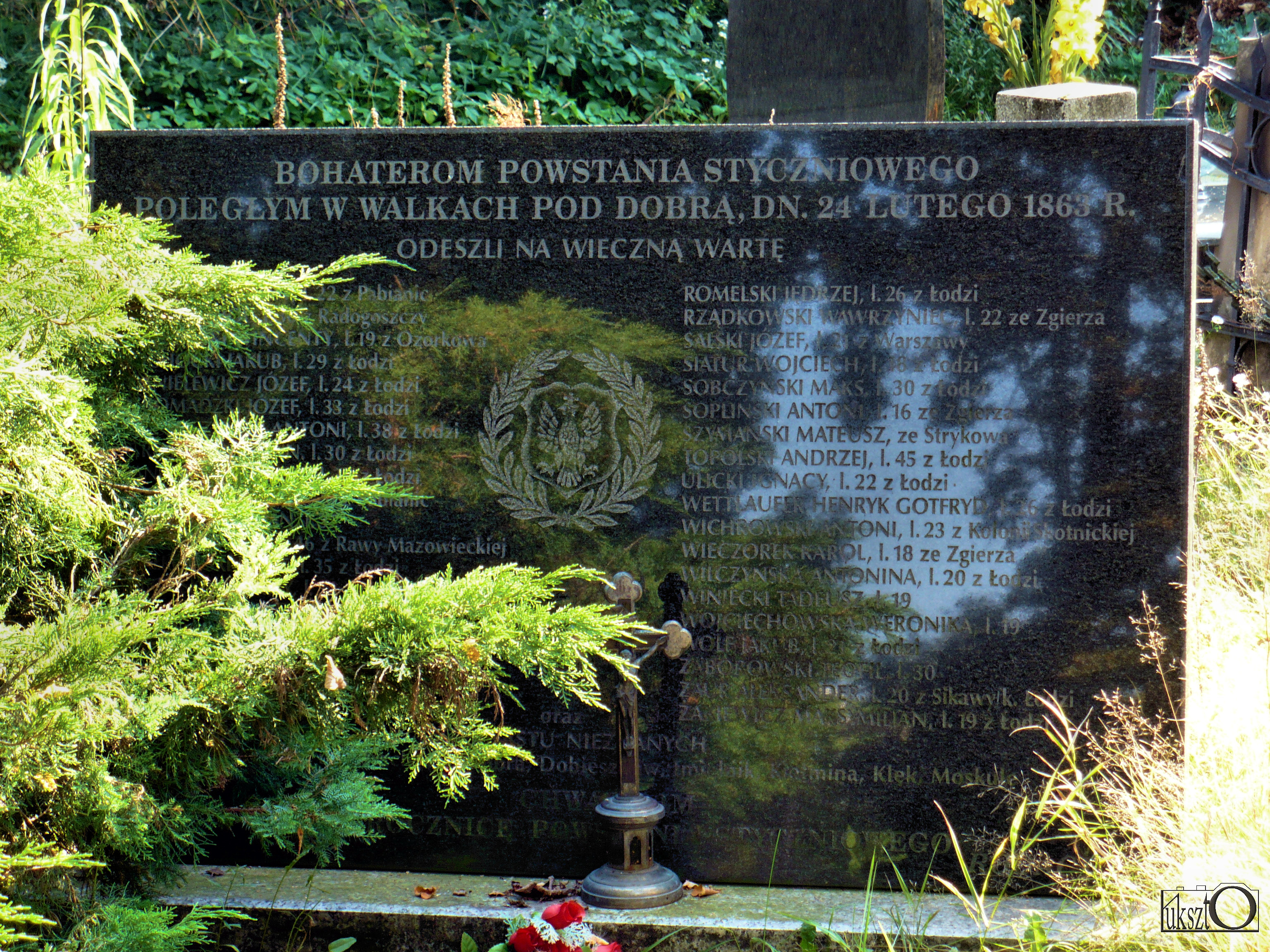
- Monument with the names of the insurgents killed in battle on their mass grave in Dobra
Date	24 February 1863
Location	Dobra
Result	Russian victory

Belligerents
(Poland) Polish insurgents	Russian Empire

Commanders and leaders
Józef Dworzaczek	

Strength
300	300

Casualties and losses
63 dead, over 100 wounded or captured	7 dead and 10 wounded

The Battle of Dobra took place on 24 February 1863 near the village of Dobra, Russian-controlled Congress Poland. It was one of many skirmishes of the January Uprising, the anti-Russian rebellion of Poles.

== Battle ==
On 22 February 1863 an insurgent unit of Józef Sawicki and Dr. Józef Dworaczek arrived at the town of Zgierz. The unit had some 300 men, including 60 riflemen, 210 kosynierzy and 30 cavalry. With food supplies received in Zgierz, the insurgents marched to the forest near the village of Dobra, where they camped. The Poles were immediately followed by a group of the Imperial Russian Army, which consisted on infantry and Cossacks.

On 24 February the Russians reached the camp and decided to attack. Polish insurgents fought desperately, but facing supreme firepower of Russian soldiers, they eventually retreated. Altogether, some 60 Poles were killed in the battle. Among the fallen Poles, was female insurgent Maria Piotrowiczowa.

== Sources ==
- Stefan Kieniewicz: Powstanie styczniowe. Warszawa: Państwowe Wydawnictwo Naukowe, 1983. ISBN 83-01-03652-4.
