= Maria Piotrowiczowa =

Polish resistance fighter (1839–1863)

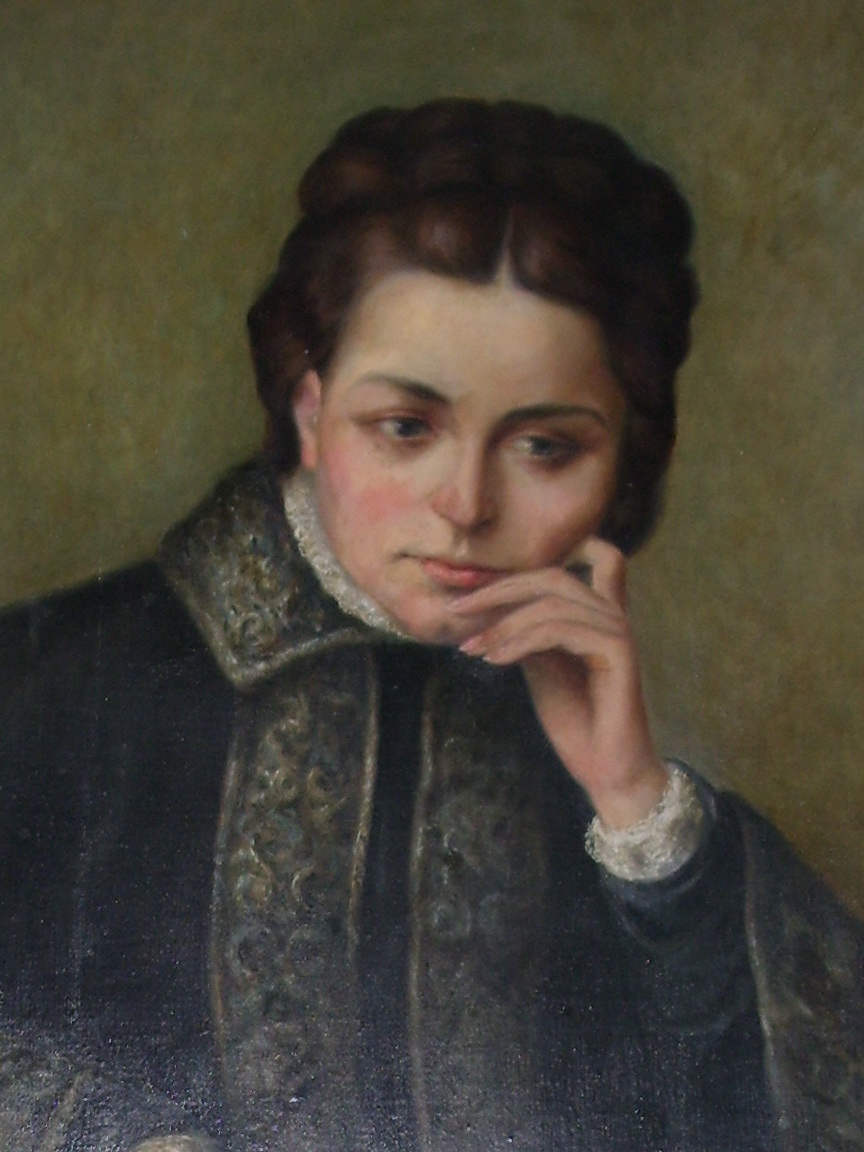
- Born: 1839; Kużnica Kiedrzyńska, Poland
- Died: 24 February 1863 (aged 23–24); Dobra, Poland
- Military career
- Allegiance: Poland

Maria Piotrowiczowa (1839 – 24 February 1863) was a Polish January insurgent and a participant of the battle of Dobra (the Łódź province). She was born in 1839 and killed on 24 February 1863.

== Family ==
Piotrowiczowa came from a patriotic family with extensive landed estates near Łódź, Poland. Her parents were Zygmunt Rogoliński, an insurgent of 1831, and Ansberta Badeńska. Her father formed his own armed detachment in the November Uprising. At the age of 17, Maria was married to Konstanty Piotrowicz, a teacher from Chocianowice. Together with her husband, she joined a Polish national organization in Łódź.

Piotrowiczowa and Piotrowicz were an outwardly well-matched couple. Piotrowicz was a kind, good and decent man who loved his homeland. An idealist, Piotrowicz took teaching jobs at the time of partitions to promote national and liberation ideas among the youth of poorer classes. He did not possess any wealth. Piotrowiczowa's family, on the other hand, inherited wealth from her elder uncle, Stanisław Strzałkowski. This secured a high standard of living for the married couple.

== The Battle of Dobra ==
February 24, 1863

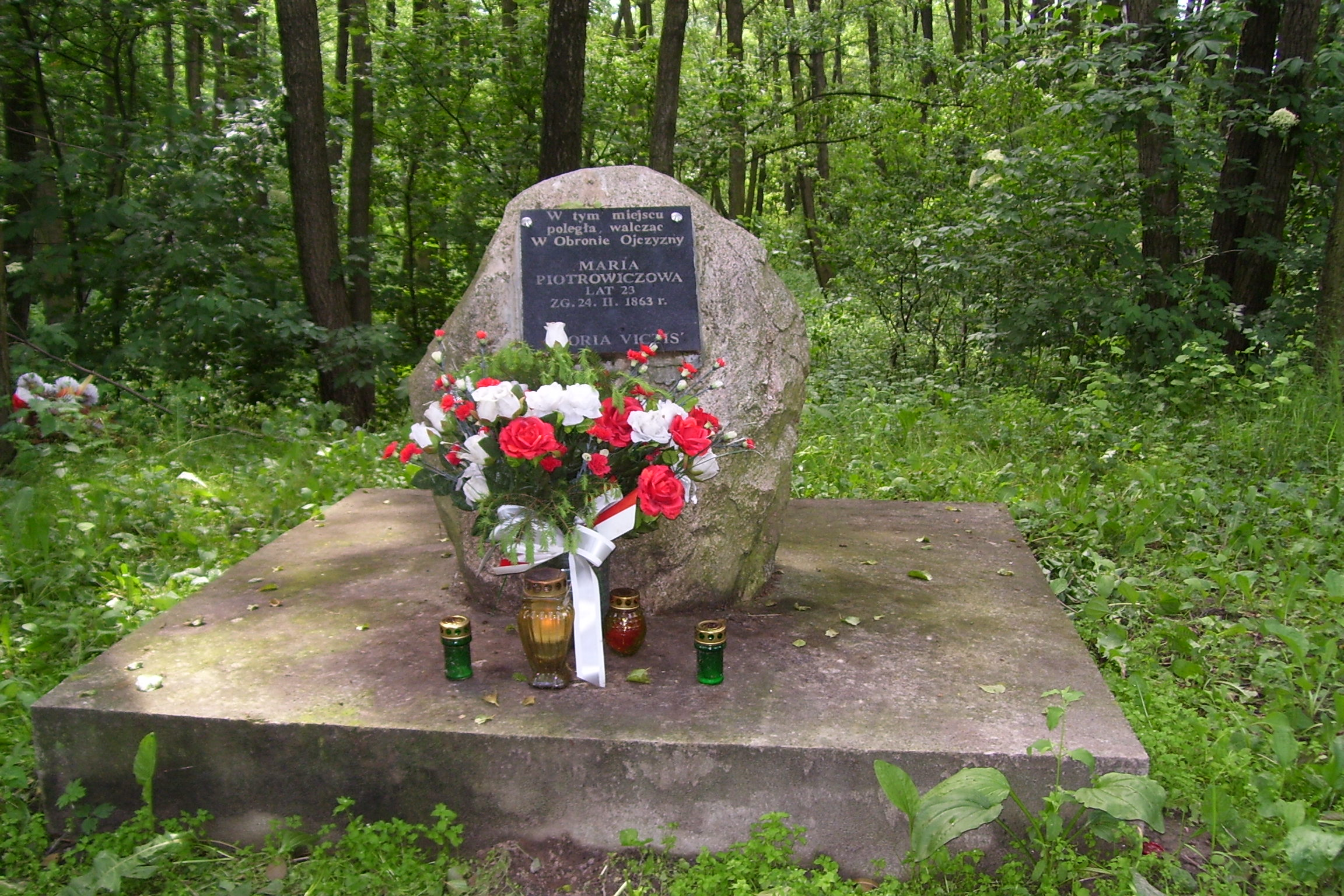
Maria Piotrowiczowa's death place near Dobra

Piotrowiczowa was deeply affected by news about the defeats, arrests, and imprisonments of insurrectionary troops and decided to support the fighting in person. Together with her husband and some of the servants from the manor farm near Łódź, she joined Józef Dworzaczek's insurgent unit. She cut her hair and donned an insurrectionary czamara (men's long-sleeved, fitted, braided outer garment, fastened at the neck, worn by Polish noblemen during the 17th-19th century). The troop consisted of several hundred people, mostly scythe-bearing peasant recruits, several dozen riflemen, and less than 50 uhlan. In the beginning, Piotrowiczowa was on auxiliary duty, collecting money for the troop and buying, weapons, food, and supplies. When the military situation deteriorated, she declared her intention of taking on front-line duty.

Piotrowiczowa's troop was tracked down by Russian garrisons stationed in Piotrków Trybunalski and Łęczyca. Because of mistakes in commending and because of an ostentatious march in the towns of the Łódź area, there was an unnecessary unmasking of the troop. It eliminated a surprise element, which is indispensable under guerrilla warfare conditions.

On 24 February 1863, as the insurgents camped on the edge of the forest near the village of Dobra, the Russians took them by surprise. Dworzaczek, a doctor, had neglected to post a guard and conduct reconnaissance. The troop was encircled and forced to accept a defensive battle.

The battle started around midday and lasted until 5:00 p.m. From the beginning, it was unfavorable for the Polish side. The insurgents repulsed two Cossack’s attacks but during the third one, they defended themselves in a chaotic way. Some insurgents did not manage to slip out of the encirclement. Piotrowiczowa fought to the very end, instead of escaping from the battlefield. She rejected the suggestion of surrender, given to her by Russian officers, because she recognized that such an attitude was incompatible with the dignity and honor of a Pole. Together with a group of young people she bravely defended the troop flag donated by Łódź women. Encircled by Cossack, she killed one, wounded another one, and killed the horse under yet another. She defended herself with a revolver and a scythe. She died from being hacked by the Cossack.

The Cossack tortured the dead Piotrowiczowa's body. Her body was pricked with piqués and sabres. Her clothing, all in shreds and in blood, was preserved by her family as a relic.

The tragedy was enhanced by the fact that Piotrowiczowa was pregnant, later it turned out that she was bearing twins. After the battle, the Russians demanded ransom for releasing her body and for allowing it to be brought to the manor house. In the battle of Dobra three more women were also killed: Weronika Wojciechowska (aged 19) – a servant from Byszewy, Antonina Wilczyńska (aged 20) – a worker from Łódź and Katarzyna, whose surname remains unknown, fighting at Piotrowiczowa's side.

In the Battle of Dobra, about 70 insurgents were killed and twice as many were wounded. About 80 insurgents were captured. Some of them were shot, others were sentenced to penal servitude.

== Funeral ==
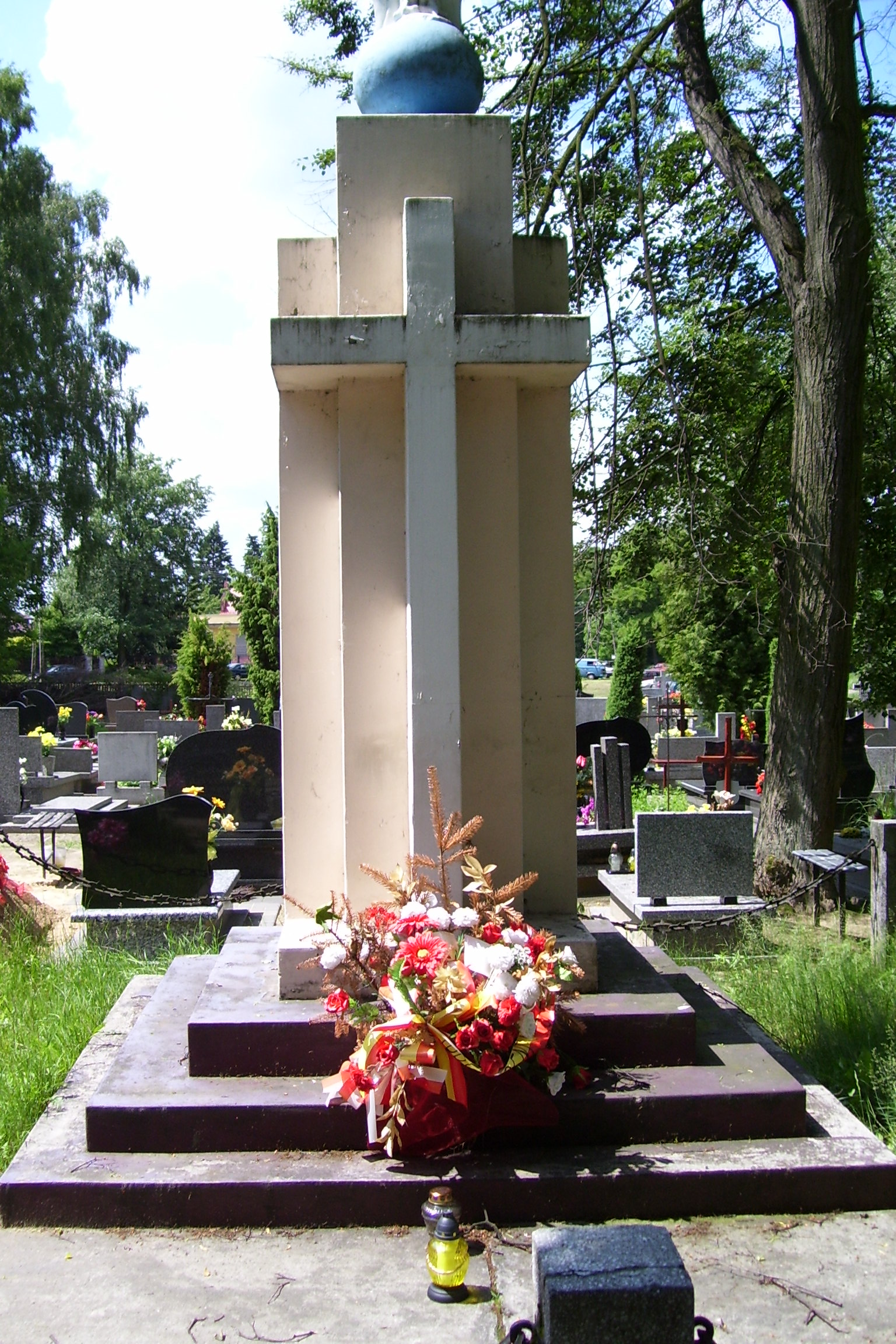
A monument in the cemetery in Dobra

Piotrowiczowa's funeral took place on 28 February 1863 in the ancestral residence of the Piotrowicz family in Radogoszcz near Łódź (Presently Radogoszcz is part of Łódź). „In an open coffin – in fathers’ old manor house was lying her corpse. Lit blessed candles, a sobbing crowd around. Into the room came a Russian captain – the one whose soldiers had murdered Maria. He took a candle out of his pocket, lit it, and put it at the feet of the heroine, and then he moved back to the corner of the chamber and, resting on his saber, was crying..."

Konstanty Piotrowicz, Piotrowiczowa's husband, to the very end fighting at his wife’s side, was seriously injured in the battle. Her servant Kacper Belka, who had been teaching Piotrowiczowa the art of shooting, horse riding, and swordplay from her youth, was also killed. The seriously wounded Piotrowicz landed in a hospital in Łódź, run by the Women’s Committee. Despite his wounds, he was slowly recovering, convinced that Piotrowiczowa had survived and was being treated in her mother's manor house. Nobody told him about his wife’s death.

At the same time Łódź was preparing for the funeral of the insurgents who died the day before in hospitals. Piotrowiczowa was to be buried together with them. Konstanty heard the ringing of the bells in a hospital room. When he was told that it was Piotrowiczowa's funeral, he had a heart attack. He died at the hands of a wife of an insurrectionary town commander, Mrs. Zajączkowska, repeating the prayer that he had asked her to say.

Piotrowiczowa and Piotrowicz were buried in a family tomb in the Old Cemetery in Łódź. Other insurgents who had died in the battle were buried in the cemetery in the village of Dobra. On the 70th anniversary of the uprising a monument was erected on their tombstone with an inscription, "To the unfree heroes of 1863 – free compatriots of 1933", and at the 140th anniversary of the uprising - a commemorative plaque was added with a list of the names of those killed in action.

Piotrowiczowa's death caused a sensation in the entire country and was among the reasons why on 16 April 1863 the War Department of the National Government banned women from being accepted into front-line duty. From then on, women were only allowed to perform auxiliary functions in insurrectionary troops. This ban was not obeyed everywhere. Women volunteered to join troops, disguised as men.

== Memorials ==
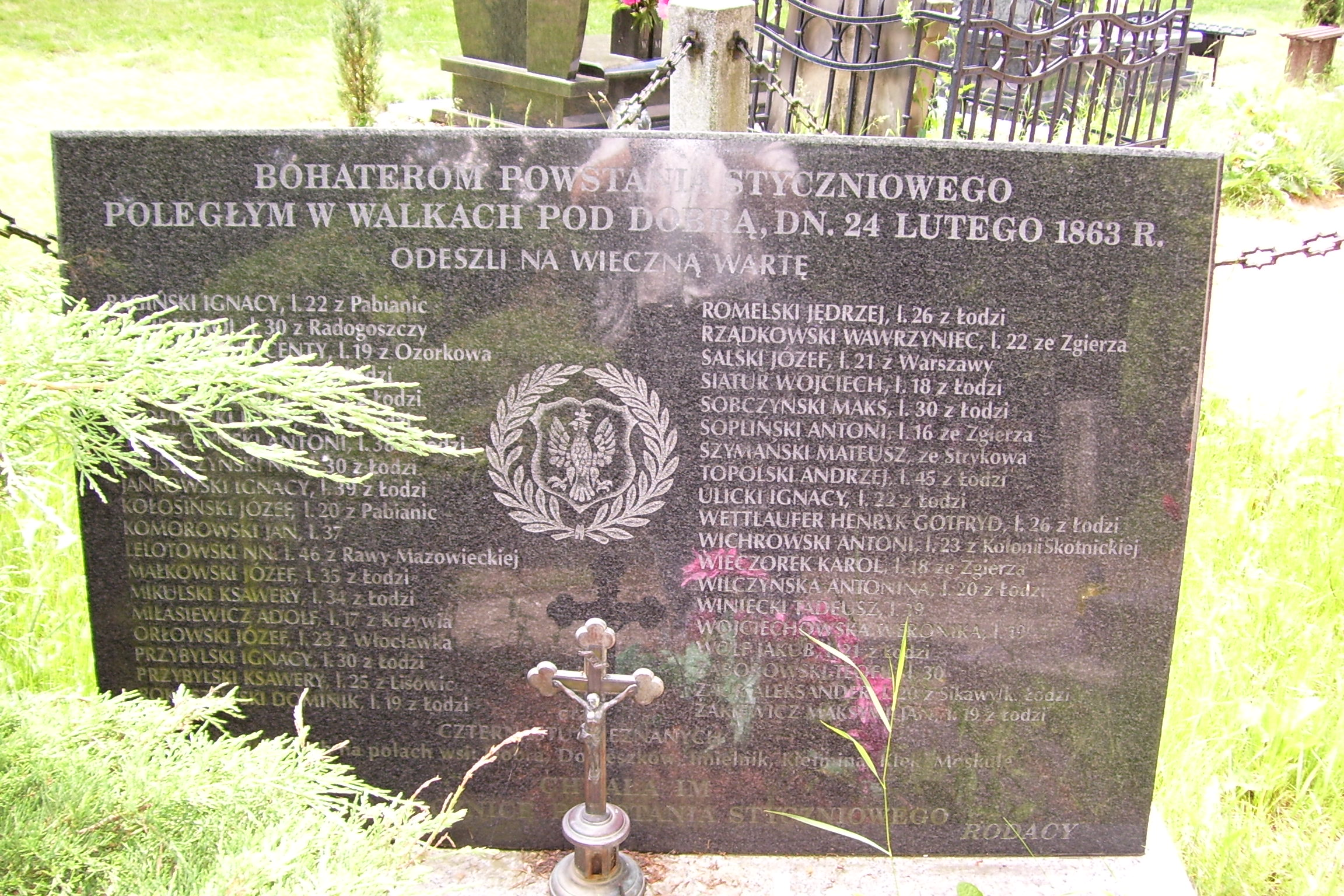
The plaque in the cemetery in Dobra

1. The tomb of Maria and Konstanty Piotrowicz in the Old Cemetery in Łódź
2. A plinth with an inscription „Gloria Victis", erected in Maria Piotrowiczowa's honor in her death place near Dobieszków
3. A commemorative plaque funded at the 100th anniversary of the uprising, is in a Roman Catholic parish church in Dobra
4. A monument in the insurrectionary section of the cemetery in Dobra - „To the unfree heroes of 1863 – free compatriots of 1933"
5. A website dedicated to Maria Piotrowiczowa: http://maria.witryna.info
6. A commemorative plaque dedicated to the Battle of Dobra in a local Roman Catholic parish church
