= Dobra, Rajasthan =

Coordinates: 28.402°N 75.755°E

Dobra is a village in Jhunjhunu district of Rajasthan, India. In the 2011 census, there were 1,334 residents. It is about 50 km from Jhunjhunu and 20 km from Pilani. Gotras are Megwal (Gurawa, Badgurjar) Lamoria and Kaswan. The nearest primary health center is in Peepli. There is a government middle school and for higher education students go to a nearby city.
