= Prempura, Bhopal (census code 482424) =

Prempura
- village
- Location within Madhya Pradesh Location within India
- Coordinates: 23.36010415°N 77.55830526°E
- Country: India
- State: Madhya Pradesh
- District: Bhopal
- Tehsil: Huzur
- Elevation: 460 m (1,510 ft)

Population (2011)
  - Total: 1,602
- Time zone: UTC+5:30 (IST)
- Postal code: 462003
- Area code: 0755
- ISO 3166 code: MP-IN
- 2011 census code: 482424

Prempura is a village in the Bhopal district of Madhya Pradesh, India. It is located in the Huzur tehsil and the Phanda block.

== Demographics ==
According to the 2011 census of India, Prempura has 339 households. The effective literacy rate (i.e. the literacy rate of population excluding children aged 6 and below) is 56.56%.

Demographics (2011 Census)
	Total	Male	Female
Population	1602	879	723
Children aged below 6 years	237	136	101
Scheduled caste	269	152	117
Scheduled tribe	0	0	0
Literates	772	479	293
Workers (all)	511	415	96
Main workers (total)	495	404	91
Main workers: Cultivators	271	249	22
Main workers: Agricultural labourers	100	69	31
Main workers: Household industry workers	3	2	1
Main workers: Other	121	84	37
Marginal workers (total)	16	11	5
Marginal workers: Cultivators	14	9	5
Marginal workers: Agricultural labourers	0	0	0
Marginal workers: Household industry workers	0	0	0
Marginal workers: Others	2	2	0
Non-workers	1091	464	627
