= Dobra, West Virginia =

Unincorporated community in West Virginia, United States

- Unincorporated community
- Location within West Virginia Location within the United States
- Coordinates: 37°56′4″N 81°49′27″W
- Country: United States
- State: West Virginia
- County: Logan
- Elevation: 827 ft (252 m)
- Time zone: UTC-5 (Eastern (EST))
  - Summer (DST): UTC-4 (EDT)
- GNIS ID: 1538222

Dobra is an unincorporated community in Logan County on West Virginia Route 17, West Virginia, United States. Their post office has been closed.
