= Dobra Bridge =

Dobra Bridge can refer to one of the following bridges:

- Dobra Bridge (A1), across the river Dobra on the Croatian A1 motorway
- Dobra Bridge (A6), across the same river, on the A6 motorway
