= Prempura, Rajasthan =

Prempura Lalsot, Dausa
- Village
- Prempura
- Location in Rajasthan Prempura (India)
- Coordinates: 26.5784633°N 76.2213558°E
- Country: India
- State: Rajasthan
- District: Dausa
- Tehsil: Lalsot
- Elevation: 312 m (1,024 ft)
- PIN: 303510
- Area code: 01431

Prempura is a tribal village in Lalsot Tehsil of Dausa district in the Indian state of Rajasthan.

The total population of this village is 749 as of 2011. Of these, 405 are male and 345 are females. The literacy percentage is 52.06%. The total geographical area of the village is 161 hectares.

In 2019, the reconstitution of Gram panchayat was carried out and the villagers of Prempura were considered in Shyampura Kalan Gram Panchayat.

Prempura pin code 325221

== Connectivity ==
Road & Rail - Situated on the Chaksu-Lalsot link road, the nearest town is Lalsot, around 13 kilometers away. The Lalsot railway station is 15 kilometers away.

Air - The nearest airport is Jaipur International Airport, around 65 kilometers away.
