= Gmina Dobra, Łobez County =

Gmina Dobra Dobra Commune
- Gmina
- Coat of arms
- Interactive map of Gmina Dobra
- Coordinates (Dobra): 53°35′0″N 15°18′20″E
- Country: Poland
- Voivodeship: West Pomeranian
- County: Łobez
- Seat: Dobra

Area
  - Total: 116.10 km^{2} (44.83 sq mi)

Population (2006)
  - Total: 4,440
  - Density: 38.2/km^{2} (99.0/sq mi)
  - Urban: 2,028
  - Rural: 2,412
- Website: http://www.dobragmina.pl/

Gmina Dobra is an urban-rural gmina (administrative district) in Łobez County, West Pomeranian Voivodeship, in north-western Poland. Its seat is the town of Dobra, which lies approximately 22 kilometres (14 mi) west of Łobez and 52 km (32 mi) east of the regional capital Szczecin.

The gmina covers an area of 116.10 square kilometres (44.8 sq mi), and as of 2006 its total population is 4,440 (out of which the population of Dobra amounts to 2,028, and the population of the rural part of the gmina is 2,412).

== Villages ==
Apart from the town of Dobra, Gmina Dobra contains the villages and settlements of Anielino, Bienice, Błądkowo, Dobropole, Grzęzienko, Grzęzno, Krzemienna, Tucze, Wojtaszyce, Wrześno and Zapłocie.

== Neighbouring gminas ==
Gmina Dobra is bordered by the gminas of Chociwel, Maszewo, Nowogard, Radowo Małe and Węgorzyno.
