= Prempura, Kaithal =

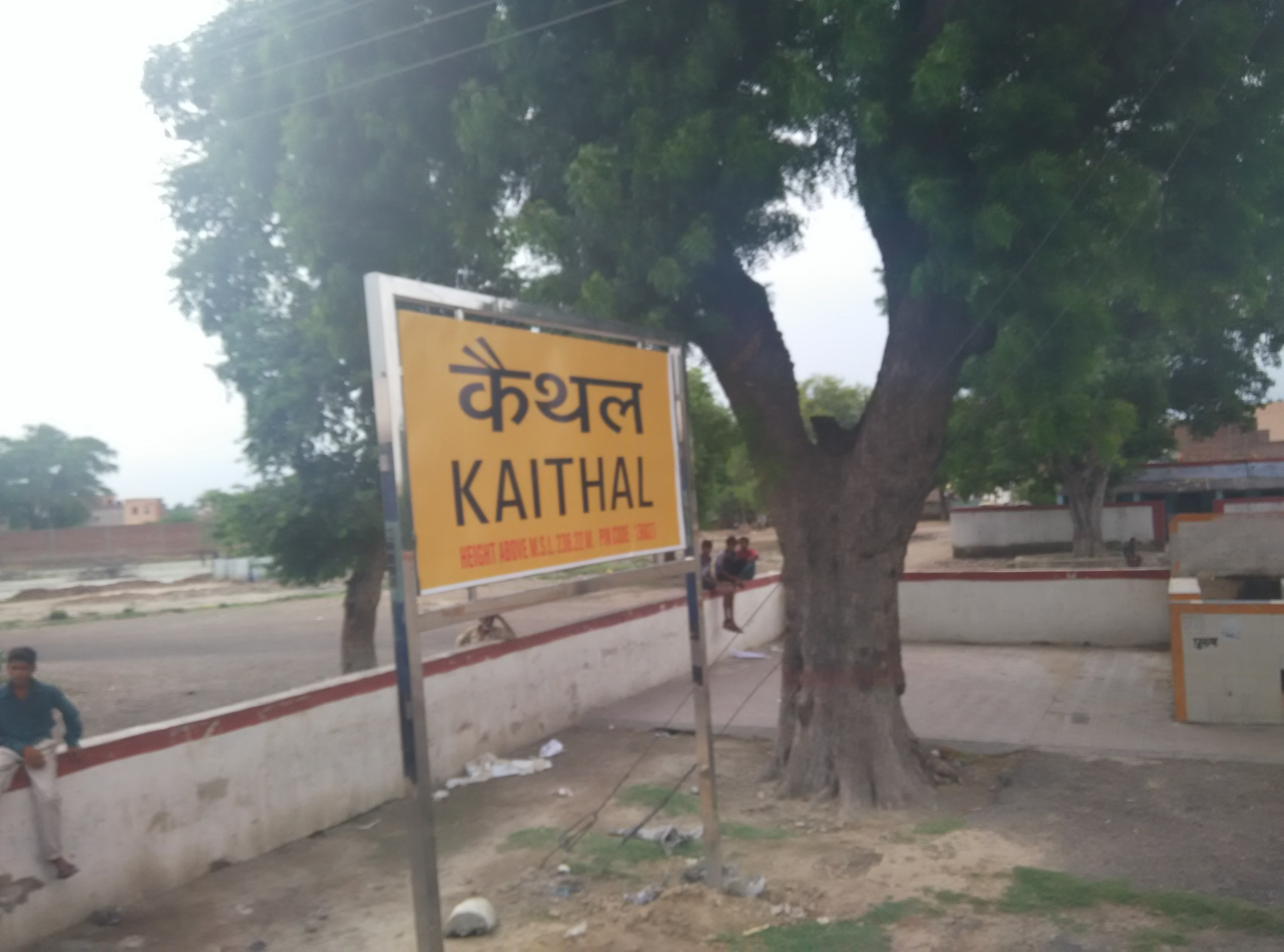
Prempura, Kaithal

Prempura is a village in Kaithal district in Haryana, India.
