= Dobro Selo, Visoko =

Dobro Selo Добро Село
- Village
- Location within Bosnia and Herzegovina
- Coordinates: 44.008561°N 18.073193°E
- Country: Bosnia and Herzegovina
- Entity: Federation of Bosnia and Herzegovina
- Canton: Zenica-Doboj
- Municipality: Visoko

Area
  - Total: 0.42 sq mi (1.09 km^{2})

Population (2013)
  - Total: 319
  - Density: 758/sq mi (293/km^{2})
- Time zone: UTC+1 (CET)
  - Summer (DST): UTC+2 (CEST)

Dobro Selo is a village in the municipality of Visoko, Bosnia and Herzegovina.

== Demographics ==
According to the 2013 census, its population was 319.

Ethnicity in 2013
Ethnicity	Number	Percentage
Bosniaks	313	98.1%
Croats	6	1.9%
Total	319	100%
