= Rifo Dobra =

Albanian photographer from Kosovo

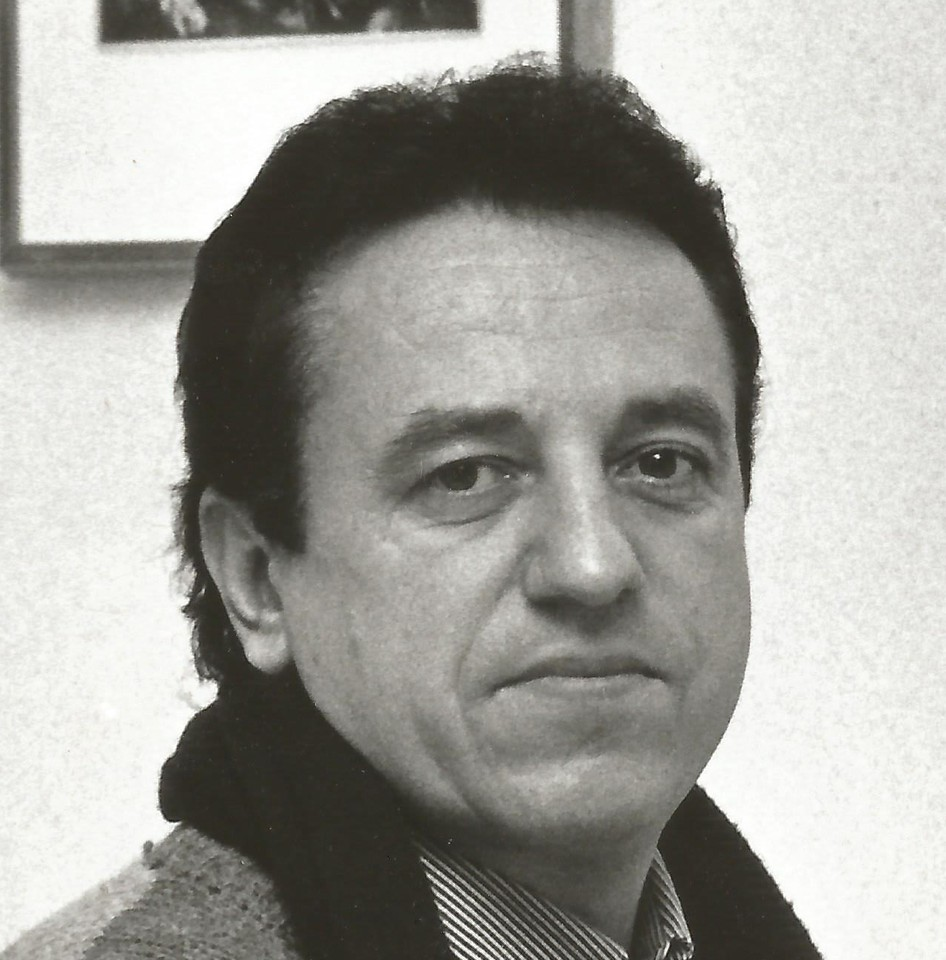
- Born: 14 April 1952 (age 73); Pristina, Kosovo, Yugoslavia
- Known for: Photography, collage, film, painting
- Movement: Art photography, abstraction

Rifo Dobra (born 14 April 1952) is an Albanian photographer from Kosovo.

== Early life and education ==
Dobra was born in Pristina, and after finishing secondary school he moved to Czechoslovakia (today's Czech Republic), where he was employed as a camera assistant in the Czechoslovak Television in Prague. From 1972, he was studying camera the Prague Film and TV Academy (FAMU), which he successfully finished in 1978.

== Career ==
Dobra's first attempts at photography began when he was 15. The first publication of his photos in the Yugoslavian press were followed by a participation in many national exhibitions. Besides advertisement and creations of covers and calendars, Dobra inclined more and more towards artistic photography, which gradually became his main focus. The gold medal in the national competition and silver one in an international one were followed by his first personal exhibition in Pristina, in 1977, and several other exhibitions in Czechoslovakia (Prague), Germany (Kassel, Berlin), and other European countries.

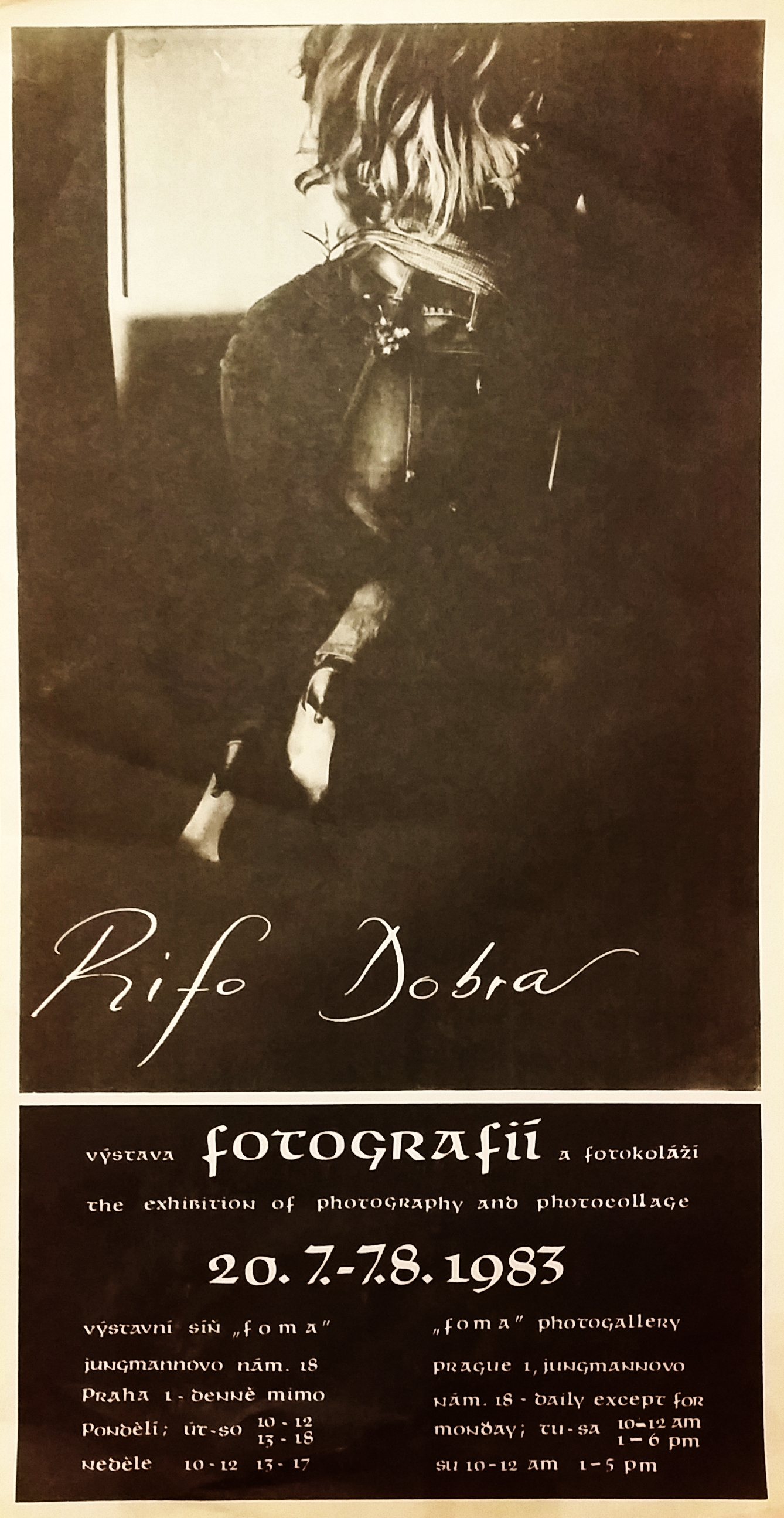
A poster to one of author's exhibitions in Prague

In 1991, Dobra founded the first commercial photographic gallery in Czechoslovakia, which organized or participated in several exhibitions during the 1990s. Some of them were beneficially oriented, for example the 1999 exhibition, which raised funds for the displaced refugees of the Kosovo war, or the 2000 exhibition raising funds for the victims of breast cancer in the Czech Republic.

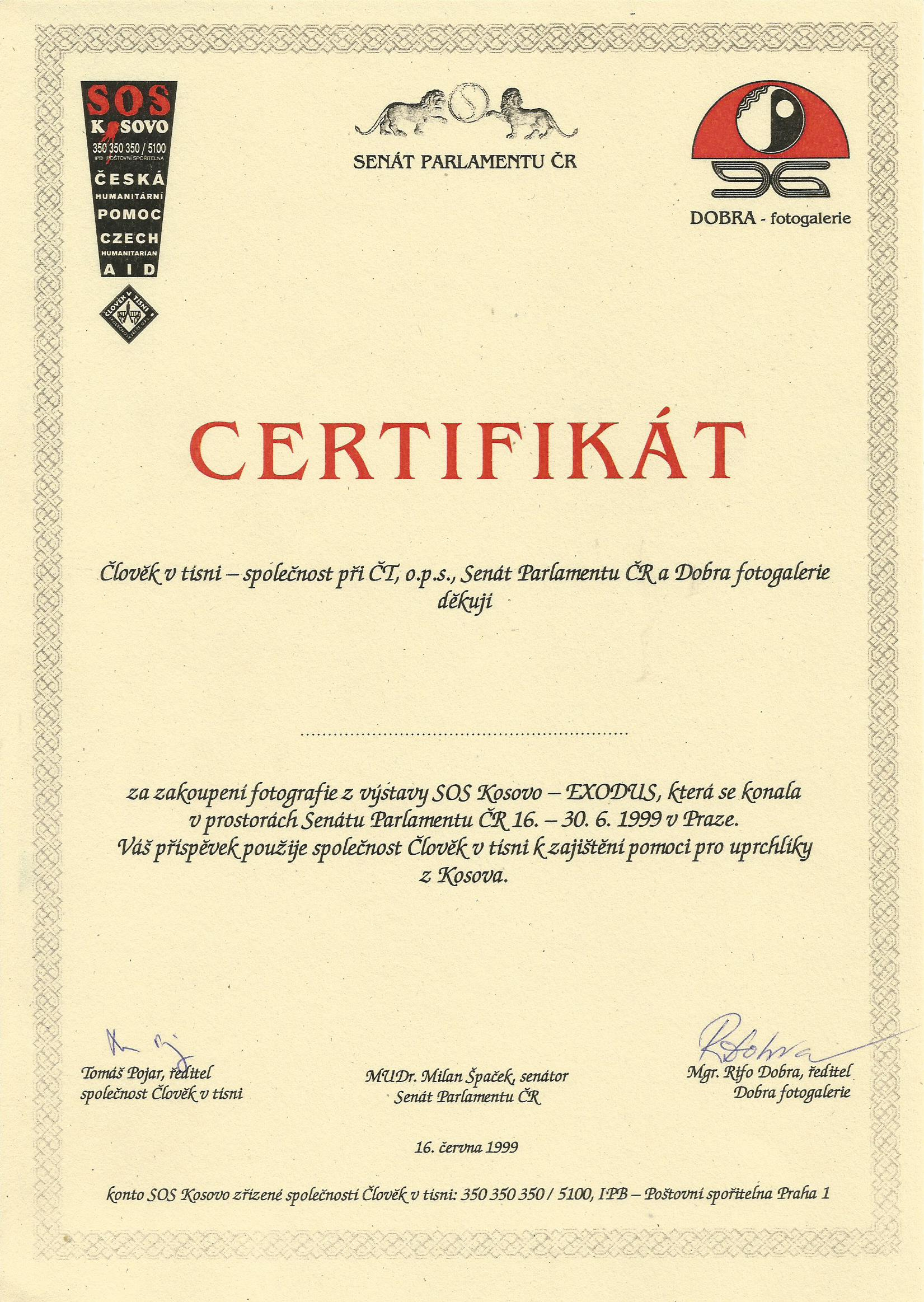
Certificate from the 1999 exhibition in Czech Senate

=== Works ===
Dobra creates almost exclusively hand-coloured black-and-white photographs, where the hand colouring plays a specific role as a means of expression. Dobra's works are often still lifes, featuring abstract themes of life (egg), contrasting elements (slice of a watermelon pressed into the carrier of an old bicycle) and surreal compositions, sometimes distantly inspired by works of classical surrealist painters such as René Magritte. Dobra's photography is closely tied to the poetics of melancholy, often exhibited by using an old, rotten wall with a falling, mouldy plaster as a background, or other worn down items (not rarely in contrast to things colourful, new and fragile).
