= Dobra, Hunedoara =

Dobra
- Commune
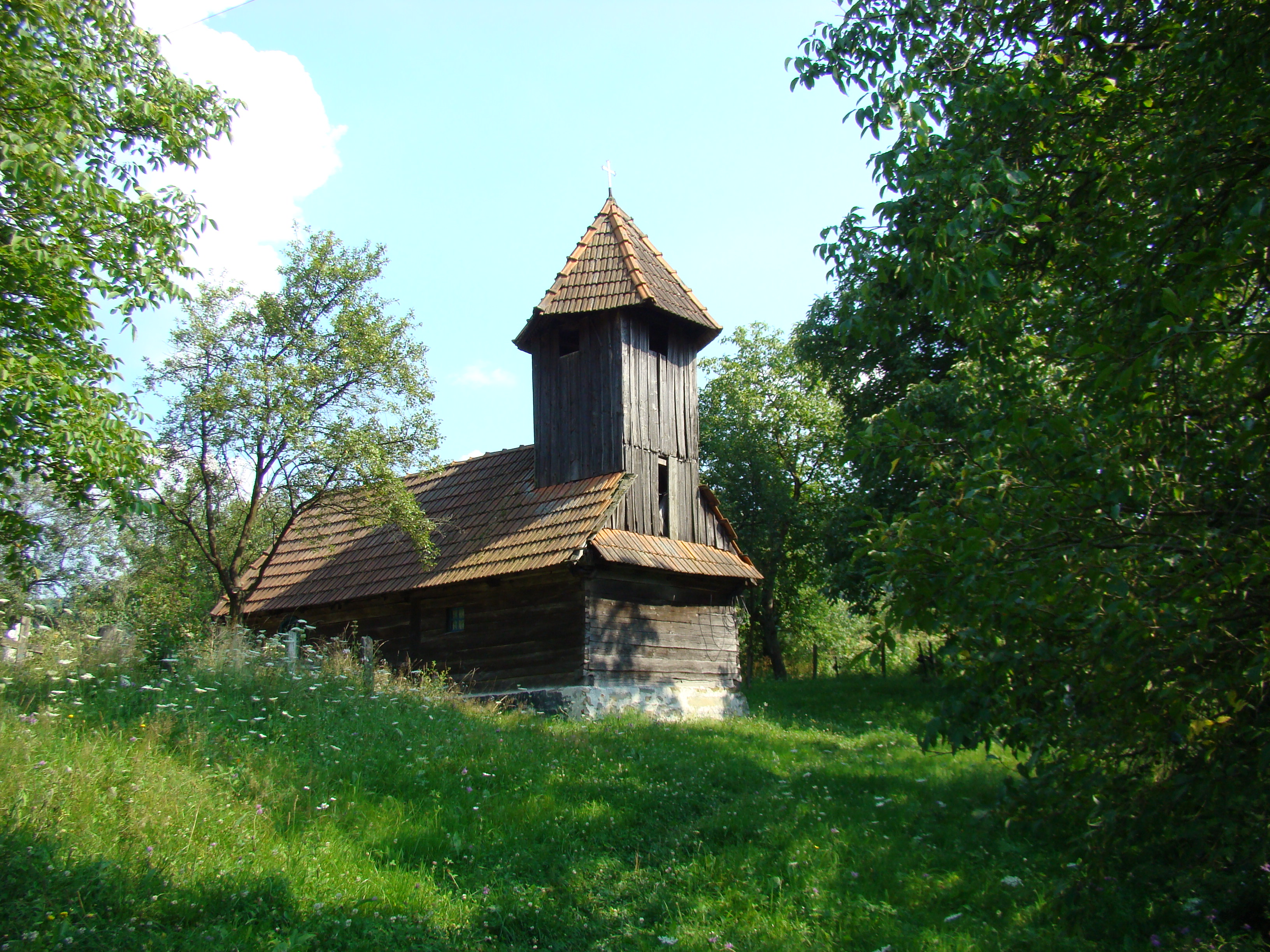
- Wooden church in Stâncești village

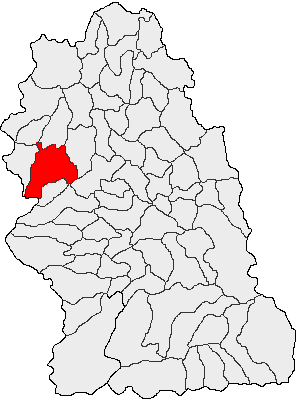
- Location in Hunedoara County

- Location in Romania
- Coordinates: 45°54′30″N 22°37′20″E
- Country: Romania
- County: Hunedoara

Government
  - Mayor (2024–2028): Ovidiu Iosif Pădurean (PSD)
- Area: 138.16 km^{2} (53.34 sq mi)
- Elevation: 175 m (574 ft)
- Population (2021-12-01): 3,203
  - Density: 23.18/km^{2} (60.04/sq mi)
- Time zone: UTC+02:00 (EET)
  - Summer (DST): UTC+03:00 (EEST)
- Postal code: 337215
- Area code: +(40) 254
- Vehicle reg.: HD
- Website: dobrahd.ro

Dobra (Hungarian: Dobra or Hunyaddobra) is a commune in Hunedoara County, Transylvania, Romania, close to the city of Deva. It is composed of thirteen villages: Abucea (Abucsa), Bujoru (Sztregonya), Dobra, Făgețel (Fazacsel), Lăpușnic (Lapusnyak), Mihăilești (Mihalesd), Panc (Pánk), Panc-Săliște (Pánkszelistye), Rădulești (Radulesd), Roșcani (Roskány), Stâncești (Sztancsesd), Stâncești-Ohaba (Sztancsesdohába), and Stretea (Sztrettye).

Historical population
Year	Pop.	±%
1850	5,114	—
1890	5,252	+2.7%
1930	5,636	+7.3%
1977	4,588	−18.6%
2002	3,499	−23.7%
2011	3,345	−4.4%
2021	3,203	−4.2%
Source: Census data

At the 2011 census, the commune had a population of 3,345; of those, 97.8% were Romanians, 1.3% Roma, and 0.7% Hungarians. At the 2021 census, there were 3,203 inhabitants, of which 93.04% were Romanians.

Stâncești village was part of the defunct Stâncești-Ohaba Commune until 1956, when it became independent. It then joined Lăpușnic in 1966 and Dobra in 1968. Its population was 172 in 1966, falling to 124 by 1992. During censuses taken in the period, over 98% of inhabitants declared themselves as Romanians.
