= Dobra, Bhopal =

Dobra
- village
- Location within Madhya Pradesh Location within India
- Coordinates: 23.3333917°N 77.3525419°E
- Country: India
- State: Madhya Pradesh
- District: Bhopal
- Tehsil: Huzur
- Elevation: 495 m (1,624 ft)

Population (2011)
  - Total: 400
- Time zone: UTC+5:30 (IST)
- ISO 3166 code: MP-IN
- 2011 census code: 482363

Dobra is a village in the Bhopal district of Madhya Pradesh, India. It is located in the Huzur tehsil and the Phanda block.

== Demographics ==
According to the 2011 census of India, Dobra has 81 households. The effective literacy rate (i.e. the literacy rate of population excluding children aged 6 and below) is 66.16%.

Demographics (2011 Census)
	Total	Male	Female
Population	400	203	197
Children aged below 6 years	72	37	35
Scheduled caste	105	53	52
Scheduled tribe	0	0	0
Literates	217	117	100
Workers (all)	157	88	69
Main workers (total)	83	71	12
Main workers: Cultivators	22	18	4
Main workers: Agricultural labourers	51	45	6
Main workers: Household industry workers	0	0	0
Main workers: Other	10	8	2
Marginal workers (total)	74	17	57
Marginal workers: Cultivators	0	0	0
Marginal workers: Agricultural labourers	73	16	57
Marginal workers: Household industry workers	0	0	0
Marginal workers: Others	1	1	0
Non-workers	243	115	128
