= Dobra (Mureș) =

River in Transylvania, Romania

Dobra Dobra-patak
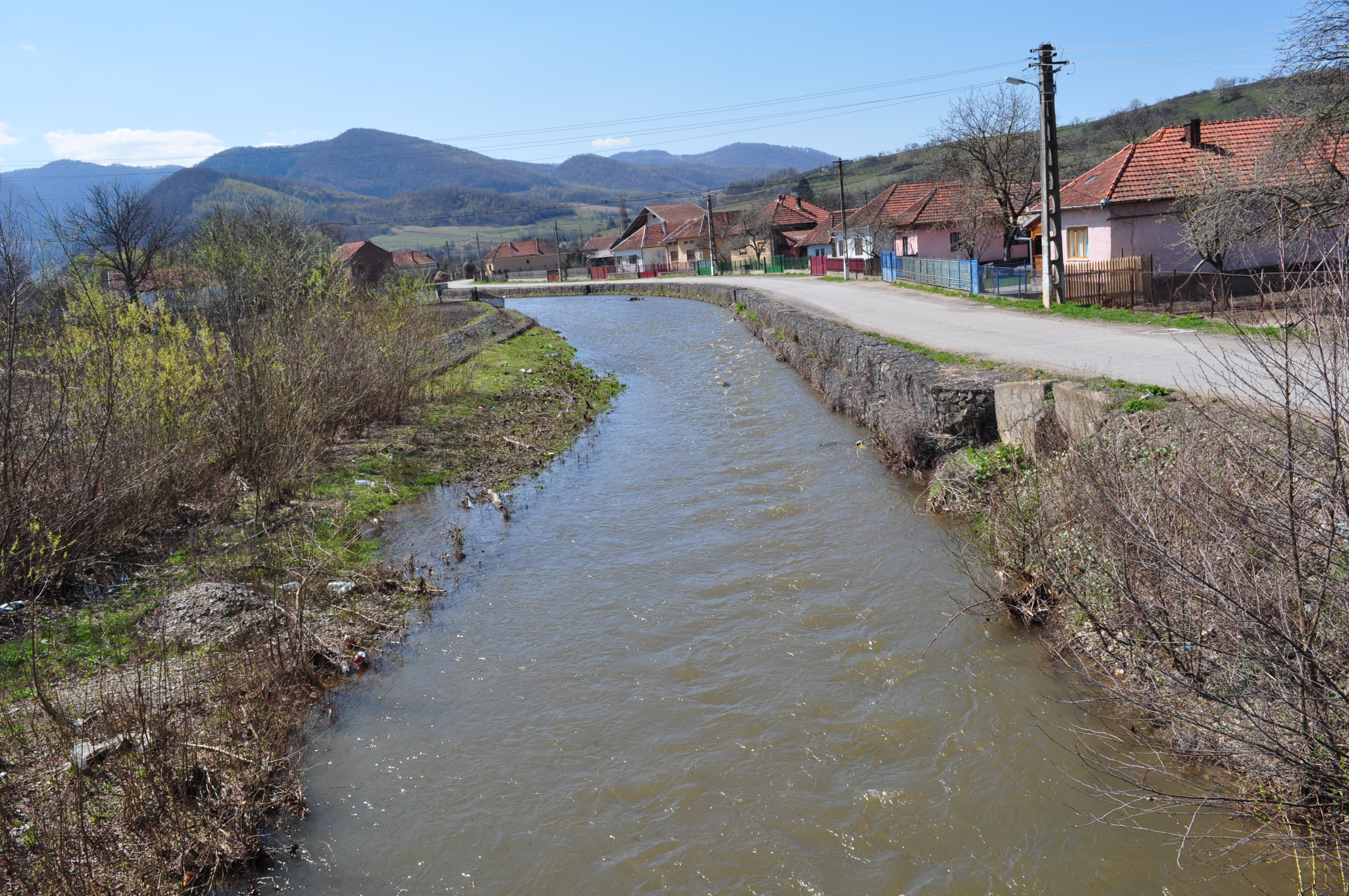

- Location within Romania

Location
- Country: Romania
- Counties: Hunedoara County
- Villages: Roșcani, Mihăiești, Dobra

Physical characteristics
- Source: Poiana Ruscă Mountains
- Mouth: Mureș
  - location: Dobra
  - coordinates: 45.9266°N 22.5626°E
- Length: 44 km (27 mi)
- Basin size: 185 km^{2} (71 sq mi)

Basin features
- Progression: Mureș→ Tisza→ Danube→ Black Sea
- Tributaries
  - left: Iazurile, Țiganu, Ciorman

The Dobra (Hungarian: Dobra-patak, in its upper course also: Bătrâna) is a left tributary of the river Mureș in Transylvania, Romania. It discharges into the Mureș in the village Dobra. Its length is 44 km (27 mi) and its basin size is 185 km^{2} (71 sq mi).
