= Schwarzenbach am Wald =

Schwarzenbach a.Wald
- Town
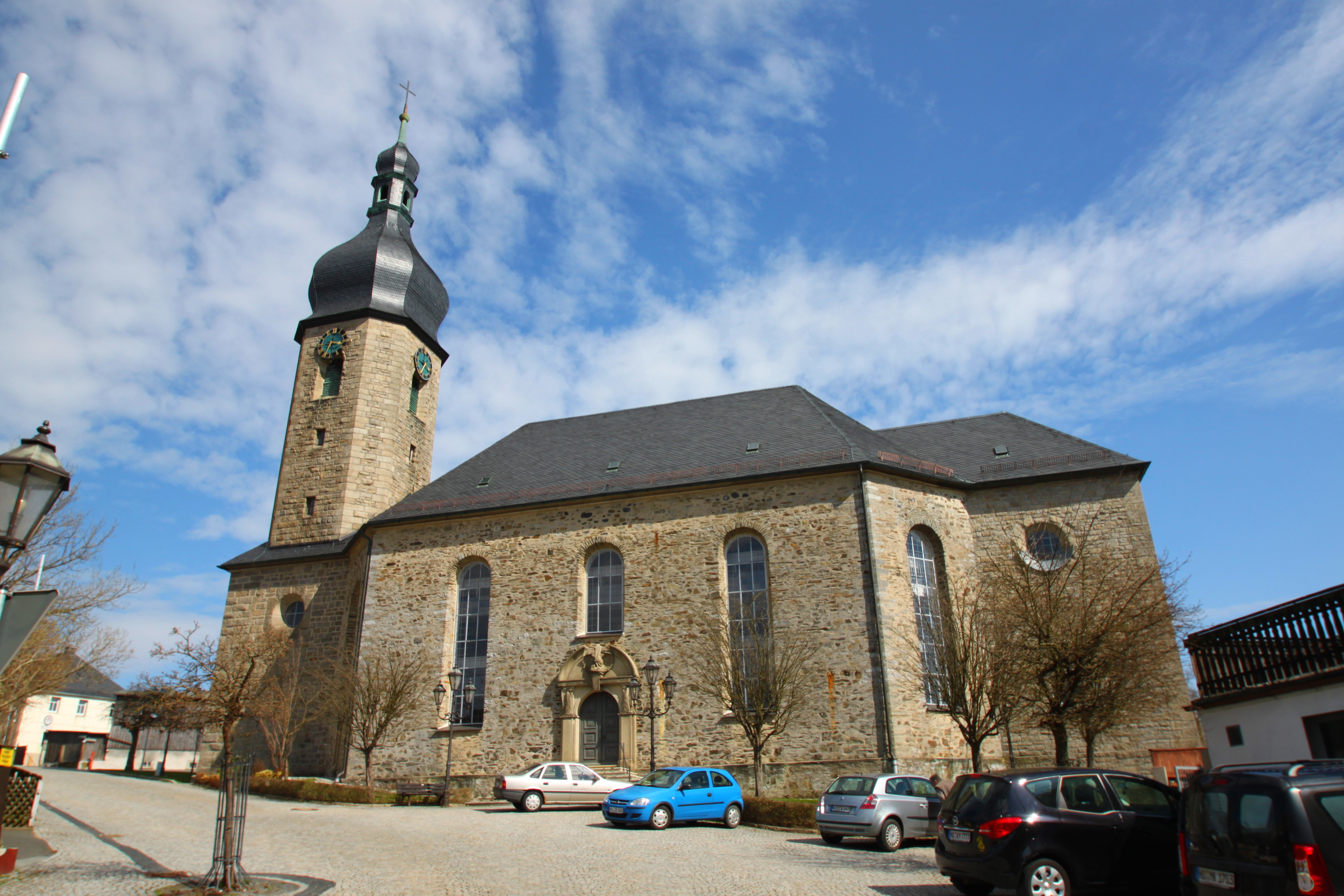
- Lutheran Church of Jesus

- Coat of arms

- Location of Schwarzenbach a.Wald within Hof district
- Interactive map of Schwarzenbach a.Wald
- Location within Germany Location within Bavaria
- Coordinates: 50°17′0″N 11°37′15″E
- Country: Germany
- State: Bavaria
- Admin. region: Oberfranken
- District: Hof
- Subdivisions: 39 Ortsteile

Government
  - Mayor (2018–24): Reiner Feulner (CSU)

Area
  - Total: 36.7 km^{2} (14.2 sq mi)
- Elevation: 686 m (2,251 ft)

Population (2025-12-31)
  - Total: 4,170
  - Density: 114/km^{2} (294/sq mi)
- Time zone: UTC+01:00 (CET)
  - Summer (DST): UTC+02:00 (CEST)
- Postal codes: 95131
- Dialling codes: 09289
- Vehicle registration: HO
- Website: www.schwarzenbach-wald.de

Schwarzenbach am Wald (German pronunciation: [ˈʃvaʁtsn̩bax ʔam ˈvalt], lit. 'Schwarzenbach on the Forest') is a town in the district of Hof, in Bavaria, Germany. It is situated 21 km west of Hof, and 23 km northeast of Kulmbach.

== Geography ==
=== Geographical situation ===
Schwarzenbach am Wald is situated in a natural environment at the bottom of the Döbraberg in the Frankenwald natural park.

=== City structure ===
- Äußera
- Bernstein am Wald
- Breitengrund
- Döbra
- Dorschenmühle
- Gemeinreuth
- Göhren
- Gottsmannsgrün
- Grubenberg
- Kleindöbra
- Lerchenhügel
- Löhmar
- Löhmarmühle
- Meierhof
- Oberleupoldsberg
- Pillmersreuth
- Poppengrün
- Poppengrund
- Räumlas
- Räumlasmühle
- Rauschenhammermühle
- Rodeck
- Sängerwald
- Schlag
- Schönbrunn
- Schönwald
- Schmölz
- Schübelhammer
- Schwarzenstein
- Sorg
- Straßdorf
- Straßhaus
- Süßengut
- Thiemitz
- Thron
- Überkehr
- Unterleupoldsberg
- Viceburg
- Zuckmantel
