= Dobro Selo, Bužim =

Dobro Selo
- Village
- Location within Bosnia and Herzegovina
- Coordinates: 45.048897°N 16.113504°E
- Country: Bosnia and Herzegovina
- Entity: Federation of Bosnia and Herzegovina
- Canton: Una-Sana
- Municipality: Bužim

Area
  - Total: 14.66 sq mi (37.98 km^{2})

Population (2013)
  - Total: 2,242
  - Density: 152.9/sq mi (59.03/km^{2})
- Time zone: UTC+1 (CET)
  - Summer (DST): UTC+2 (CEST)

Dobro Selo is a village in the municipality of Bužim, Bosnia and Herzegovina.

== Demographics ==
According to the 2013 census, its population was 2,242.

Ethnicity in 2013
Ethnicity	Number	Percentage
Bosniaks	2,239	99.9%
Croats	1	0.0%
other/undeclared	2	0.1%
Total	2,242	100%
