= Dobra, Zgierz County =

Dobra
- Village
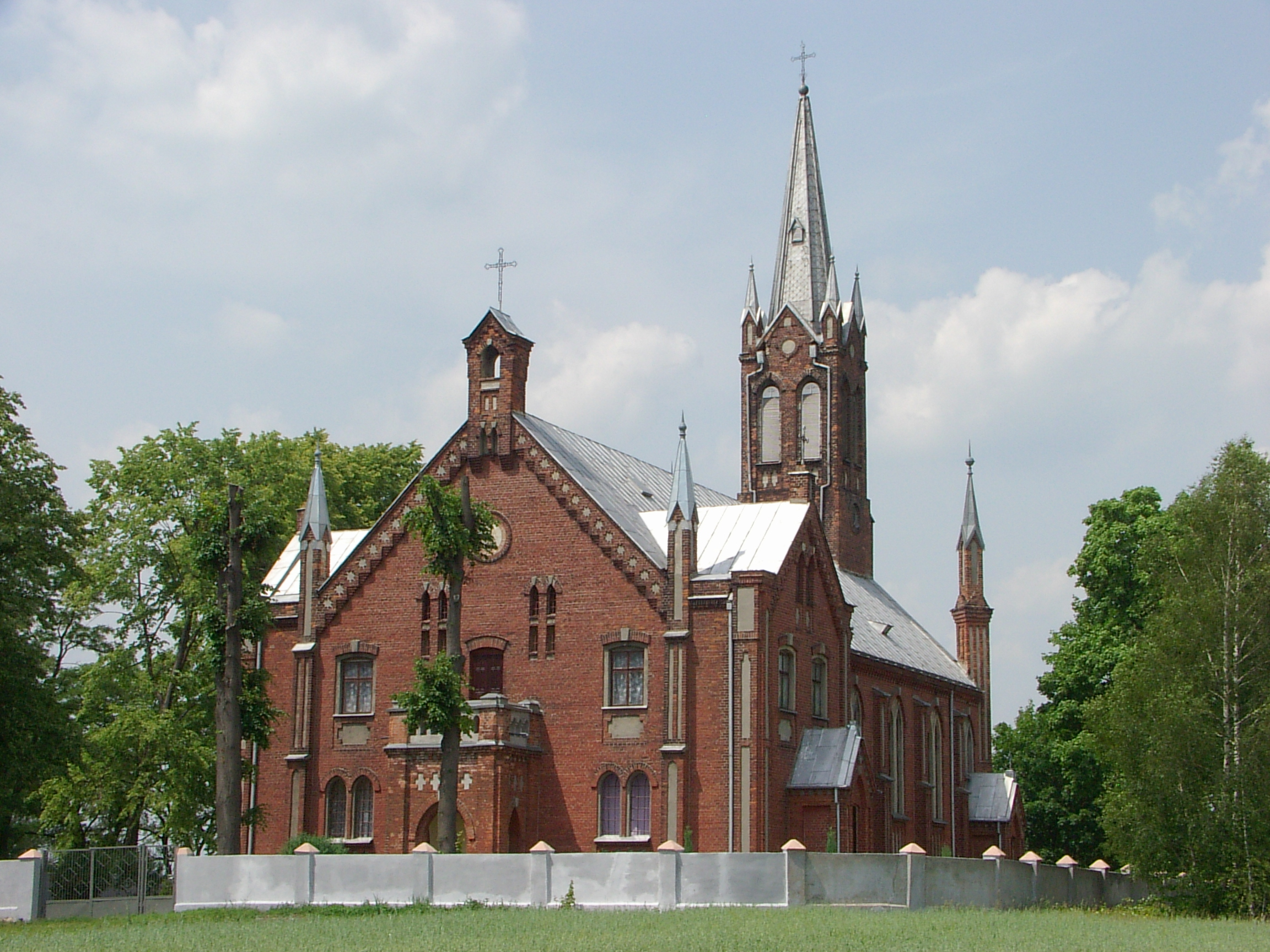
- Mariavite church in Dobra

- Location within Poland
- Coordinates: 51°52′5″N 19°33′1″E
- Country: Poland
- Voivodeship: Łódź
- County: Zgierz
- Gmina: Stryków
- Population: 510

Dobra [ˈdɔbra] is a village in the administrative district of Gmina Stryków, within Zgierz County, Łódź Voivodeship, in central Poland.

The Battle of Dobra took place in the village during the January Uprising.
