= Dobra, Łobez County =

Dobra
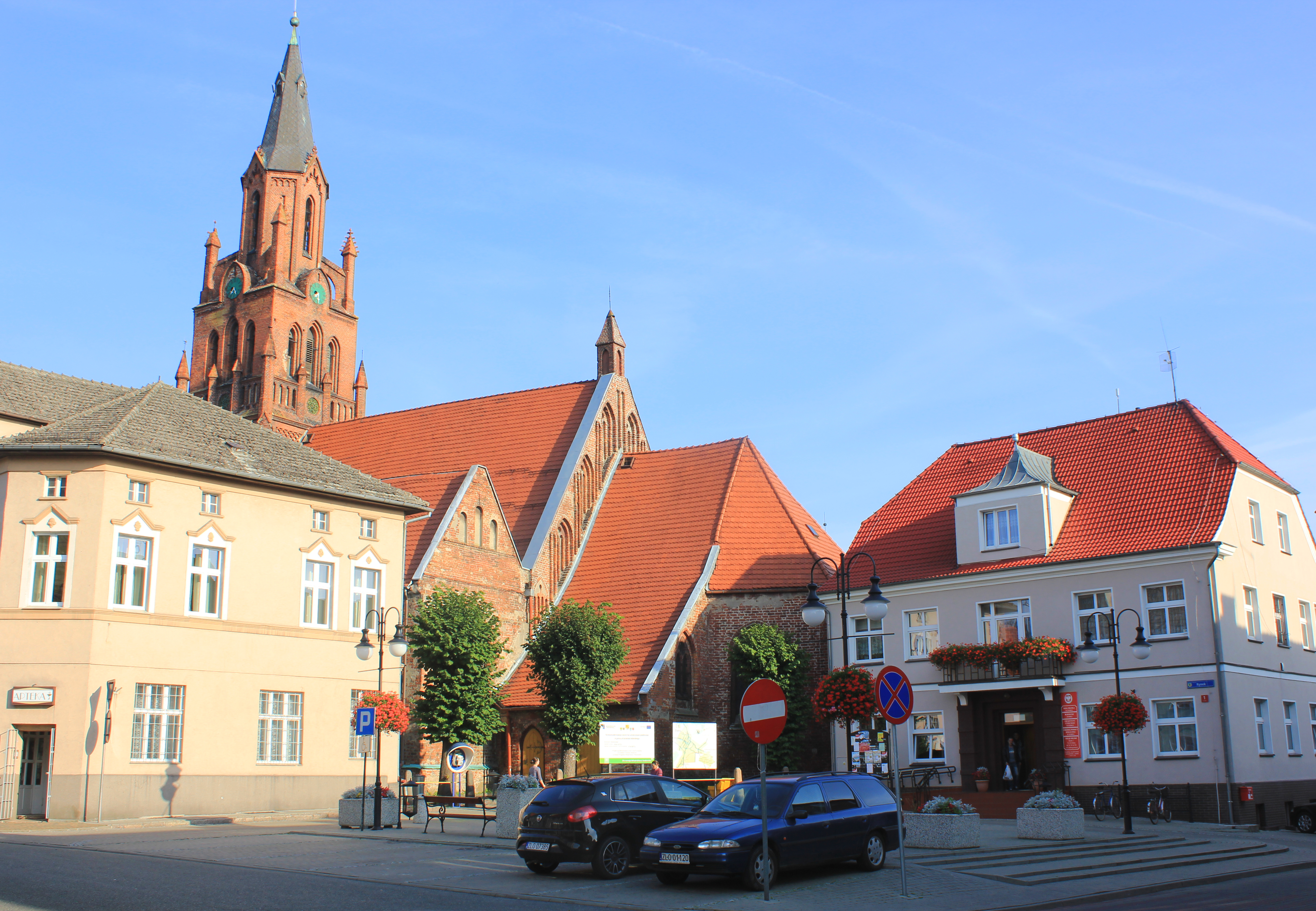
- Town center with the Saint Clare church and the town hall

- Coat of arms

- Location within Poland
- Coordinates: 53°35′0″N 15°18′20″E
- Country: Poland
- Voivodeship: West Pomeranian
- County: Łobez
- Gmina: Dobra
- Town rights: before 1331

Government
  - Mayor: Krzysztof Wrzesień

Area
  - Total: 2.32 km^{2} (0.90 sq mi)
- Highest elevation: 92 m (302 ft)
- Lowest elevation: 72 m (236 ft)

Population (31 December 2021)
  - Total: 2,215
  - Density: 955/km^{2} (2,470/sq mi)
- Time zone: UTC+1 (CET)
  - Summer (DST): UTC+2 (CEST)
- Postal code: 72-210
- Area code: +48 91
- Vehicle registration: ZLO
- Website: http://www.dobragmina.pl

Dobra [ˈdɔbra] (German: Daber), also known as Dobra Nowogardzka, is a town in Łobez County, West Pomeranian Voivodeship, in northwestern Poland. It has 2,215 inhabitants as of December 2021.

== History ==
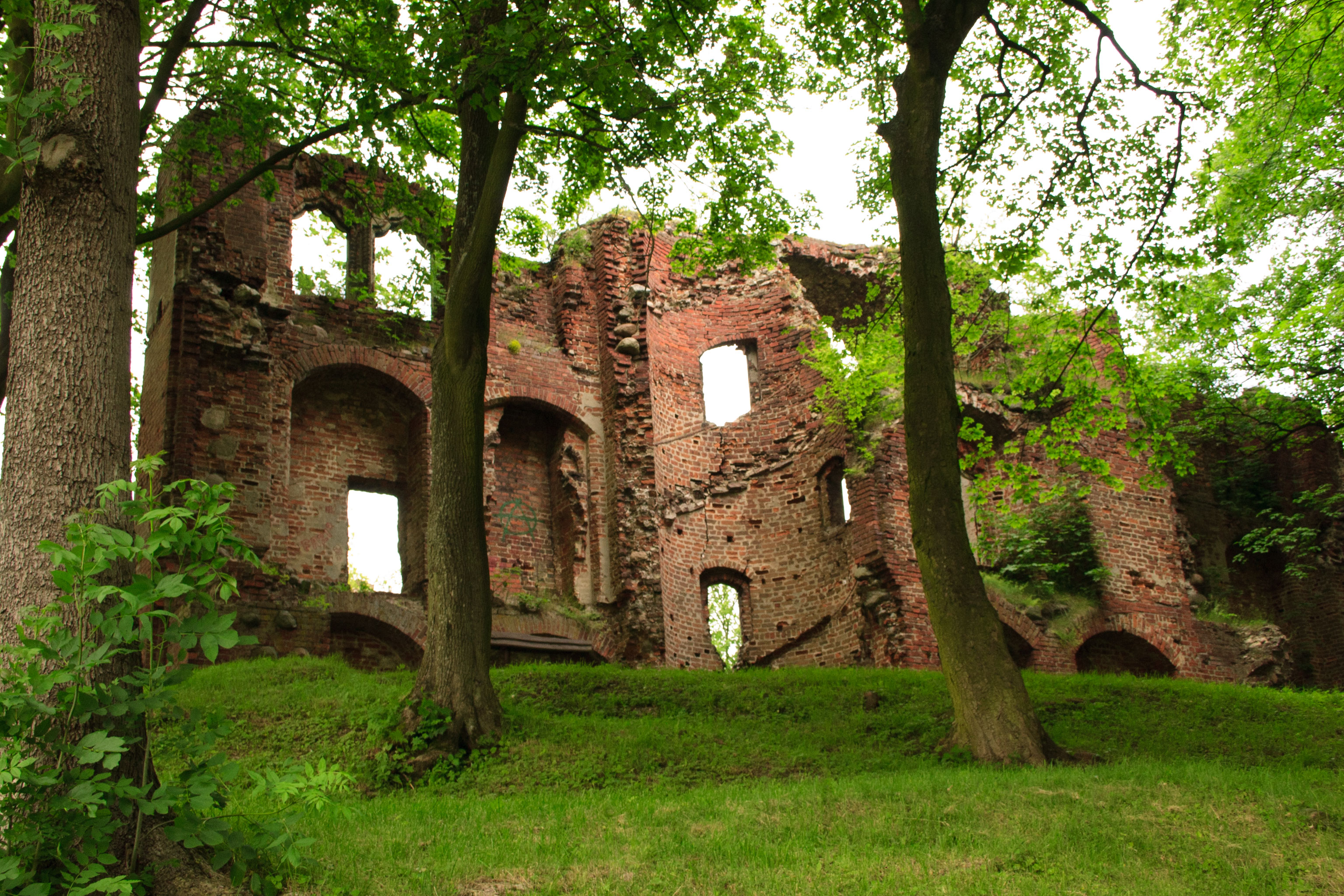
Castle ruins

In the Middle Ages, a Slavic gród existed in present-day Dobra. The territory became part of the emerging Polish state under its first ruler Mieszko I around 967. It was granted town rights before 1331. In the 13th and 14th centuries, a castle was built, later rebuilt in the 16th century, and heavily damaged between the 17th and 19th centuries. In 1647, due to a plague epidemic, the population of Dobra dropped from over 600 to only 48 inhabitants.

From the 18th century, Dobra was part of Prussia, and from 1871 it was part of the German Empire. In 1895, a narrow-gauge railway was built, connecting the town with Stargard. Following the defeat of Nazi Germany in World War II and under the terms of the Potsdam Agreement, the town became again part of Poland.

== Demographics ==
Historical population

Year	Pop.	±%
1871	2,158	—
1880	2,271	+5.2%
1890	2,156	−5.1%
1900	2,305	+6.9%
1910	2,213	−4.0%

Year	Pop.	±%
1925	2,218	+0.2%
1950	1,397	−37.0%
1960	2,004	+43.5%
2010	2,305	+15.0%

== Gallery ==
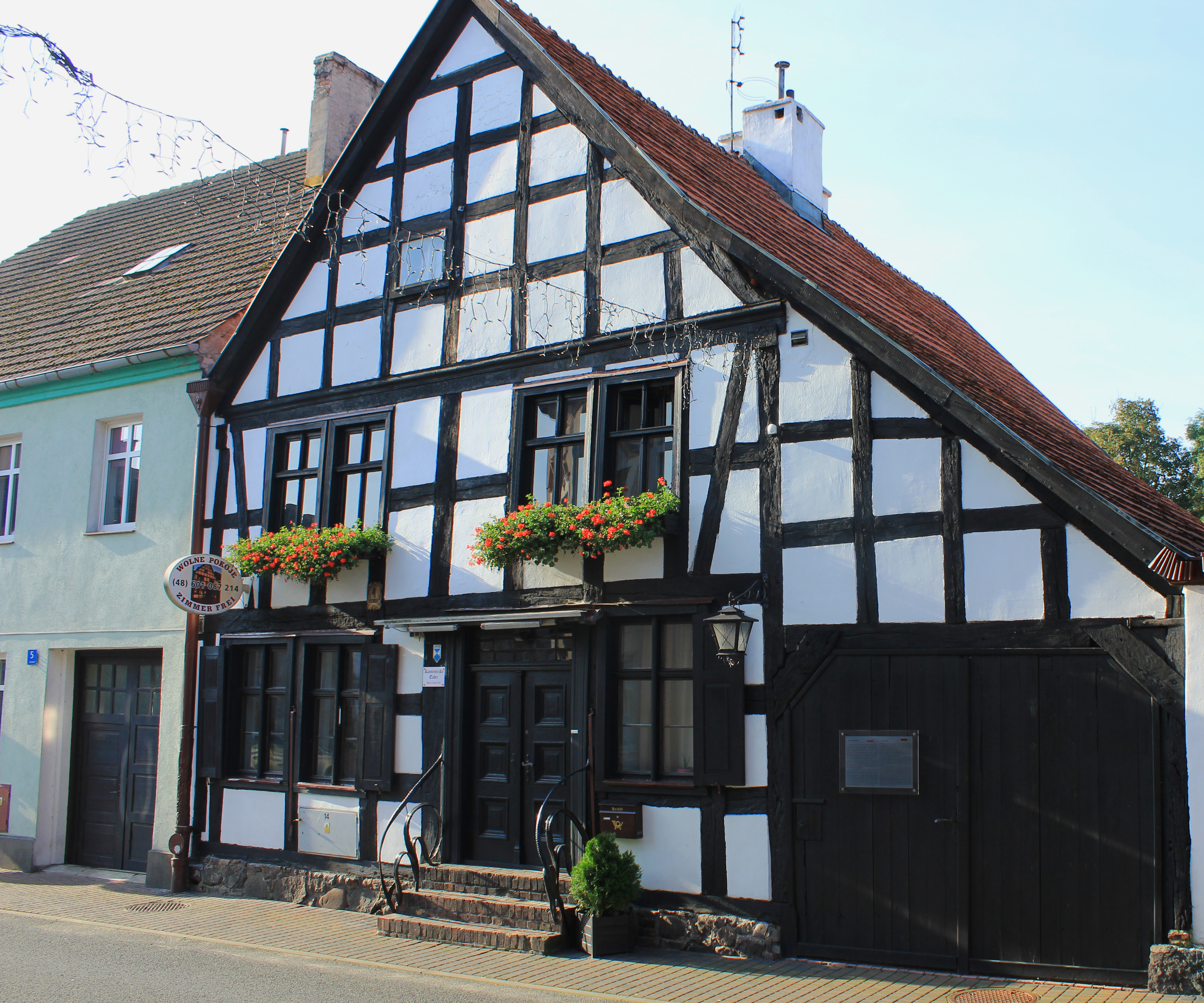
The oldest preserved townhouse in Dobra

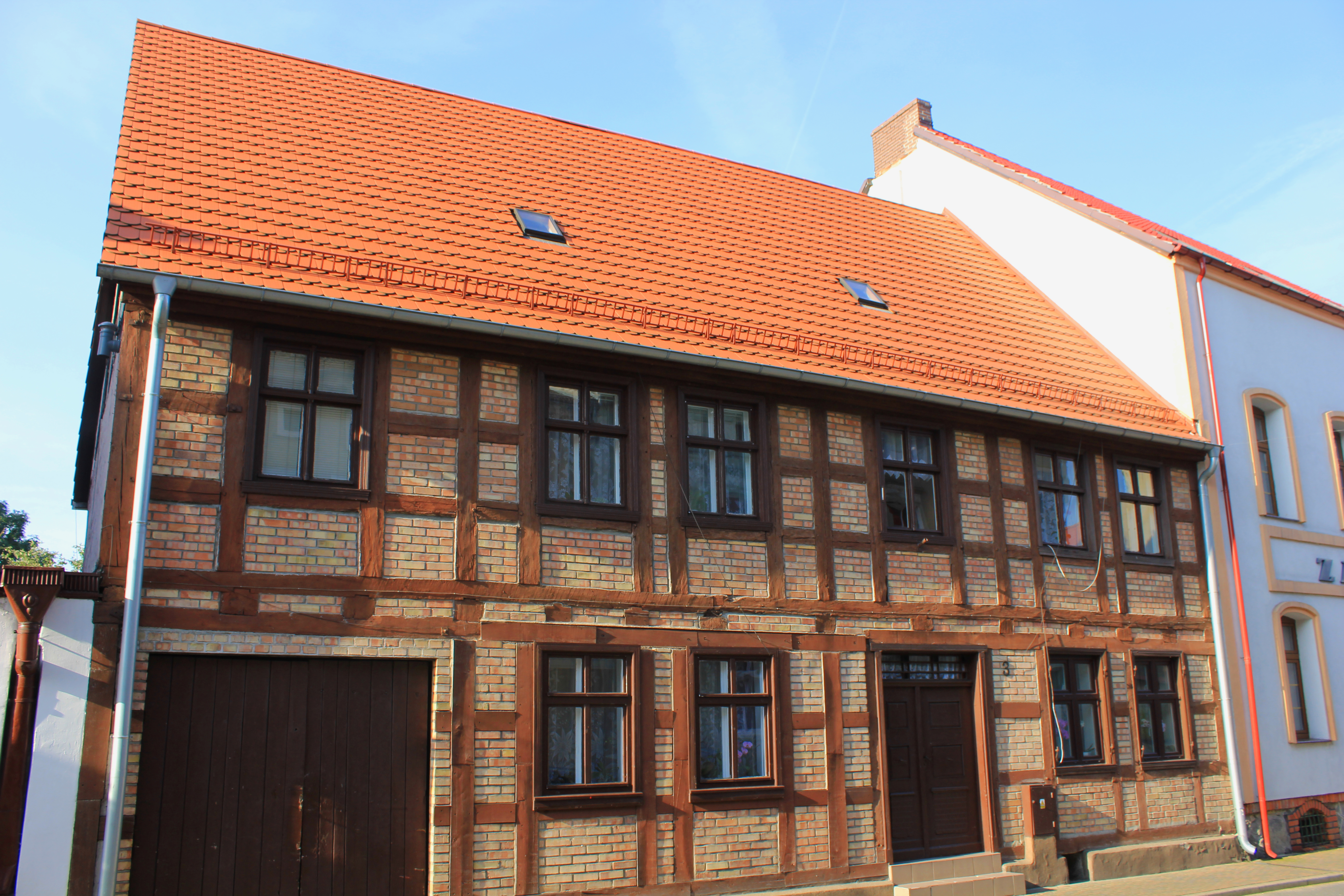
Old timber-framed house

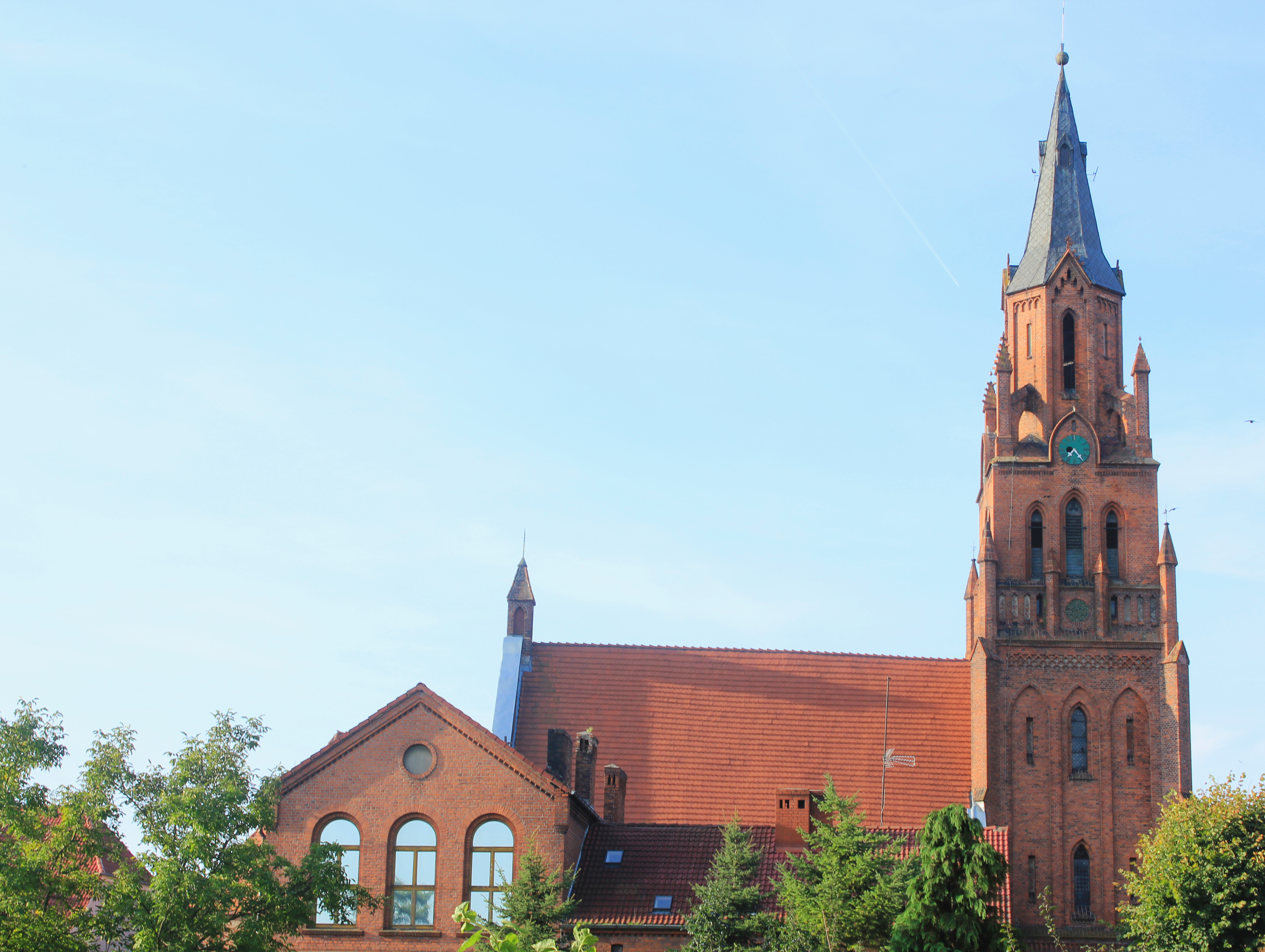
Saint Clare church

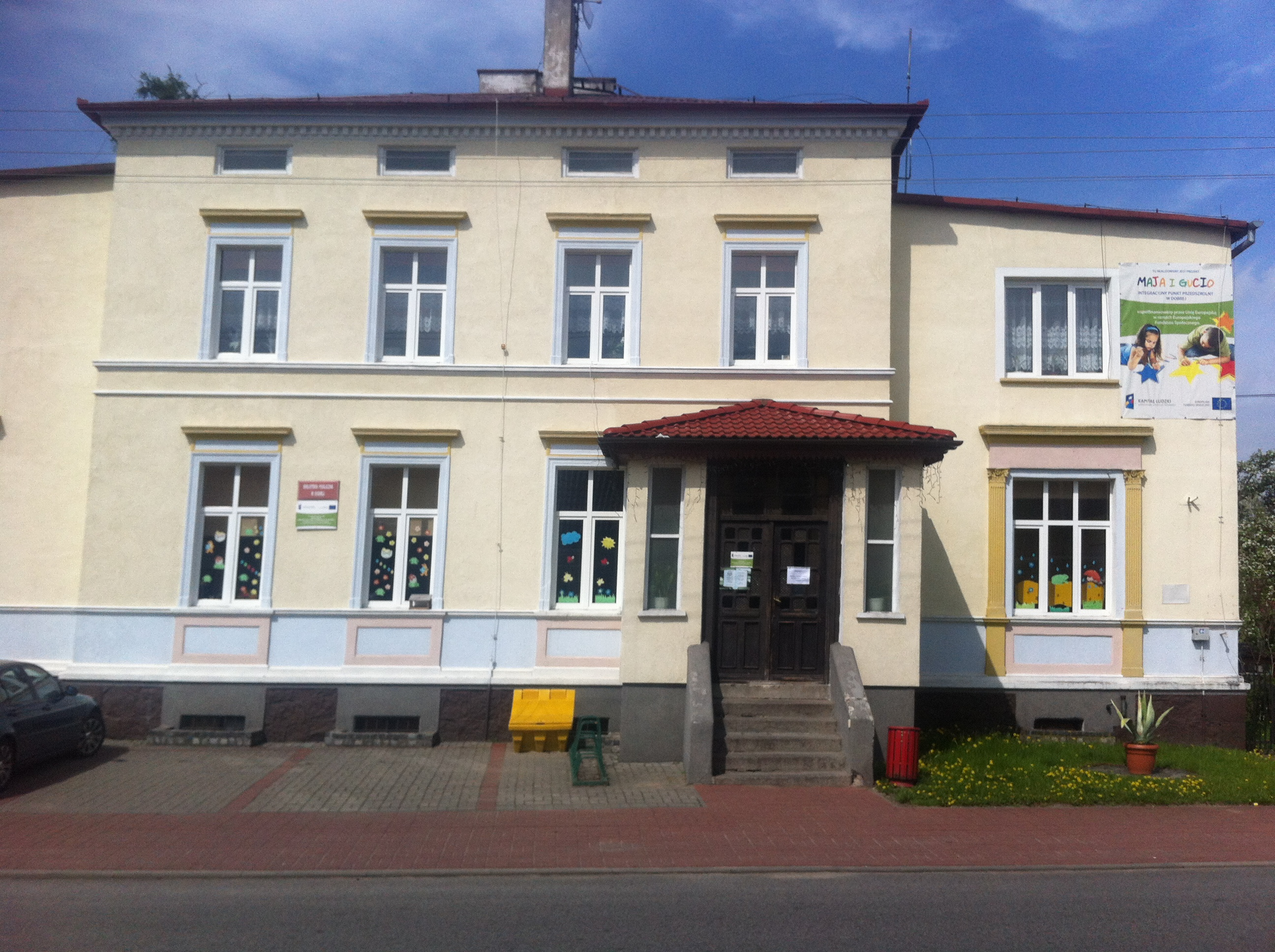
Library
