= Drawsko =

Drawsko may refer to:

- Drawsko Pomorskie, a town in West Pomeranian Voivodeship (north-west Poland), seat of Drawsko County
- Drawsko Lake, in West Pomeranian Voivodeship
- Drawsko, Greater Poland Voivodeship, a village in west Poland, seat of Gmina Drawsko

== See also ==
- Nowe Drawsko, a village in West Pomeranian Voivodeship
- Stare Drawsko, a village in West Pomeranian Voivodeship
