= Świerczyna, Drawsko County =

Świerczyna
- Village
- Location within Poland
- Coordinates: 53°26′27″N 16°16′28″E
- Country: Poland
- Voivodeship: West Pomeranian
- County: Drawsko
- Gmina: Wierzchowo
- Population: 850

Świerczyna (Polish: [ɕfjɛrˈt͡ʂɨna]; German: Groß Linichen) is a village in the administrative district of Gmina Wierzchowo, within Drawsko County, West Pomeranian Voivodeship, in north-western Poland. It lies approximately 12 km (7 mi) east of Wierzchowo, 34 km (21 mi) east of Drawsko Pomorskie, and 113 km (70 mi) east of the regional capital Szczecin.

For the history of the region, see History of Pomerania.

The village has a population of 850.
