= Żabinek =

- Village
- Location within Poland
- Coordinates: 53°26′N 16°4′E
- Country: Poland
- Voivodeship: West Pomeranian
- County: Drawsko
- Gmina: Wierzchowo
- Population: 310

Żabinek [ʐaˈbinɛk] (German: Klein Sabin) is a village in the administrative district of Gmina Wierzchowo, within Drawsko County, West Pomeranian Voivodeship, in north-western Poland. It lies approximately 4 km (2 mi) south-west of Wierzchowo, 21 km (13 mi) south-east of Drawsko Pomorskie, and 99 km (62 mi) east of the regional capital Szczecin.

For the history of the region, see History of Pomerania.

The village has a population of 310.
