= Kluczewo, West Pomeranian Voivodeship =

Kluczewo
- Village
- Location within Poland
- Coordinates: 53°39′3″N 16°11′6″E
- Country: Poland
- Voivodeship: West Pomeranian
- County: Drawsko
- Gmina: Czaplinek
- Time zone: UTC+1 (CET)
  - Summer (DST): UTC+2 (CEST)
- Area code: +48 94
- Car plates: ZDR

Kluczewo [kluˈt͡ʂɛvɔ] (German: Klaushagen) is a village in the administrative district of Gmina Czaplinek, within Drawsko County, West Pomeranian Voivodeship, in north-western Poland. It lies approximately 12 km (7 mi) north of Czaplinek, 29 km (18 mi) north-east of Drawsko Pomorskie, and 110 km (68 mi) east of the regional capital Szczecin.

Before 1772 the area was part of Kingdom of Poland, 1772–1871 Prussia, 1871–1945 Germany. For more on its history, see Drahim County.
