= Sośnica, West Pomeranian Voivodeship =

Sośnica
- Village
- Location within Poland
- Coordinates: 53°26′N 16°12′E
- Country: Poland
- Voivodeship: West Pomeranian
- County: Drawsko
- Gmina: Wierzchowo
- Population: 200

Sośnica ([sɔɕˈnit͡sa]; German: Herzberg, German pronunciation: [ˈhɛʁt͡sˌbɛʁk]) is a village in the administrative district of Gmina Wierzchowo, within Drawsko County, West Pomeranian Voivodeship, in north-western Poland. It lies approximately 8 km (5 mi) south-east of Wierzchowo, 29 km (18 mi) south-east of Drawsko Pomorskie, and 108 km (67 mi) east of the regional capital Szczecin.

For the history of the region, see History of Pomerania.

The village has a population of 200.
