= Żabin, West Pomeranian Voivodeship =

Żabin
- Village
- Location within Poland
- Coordinates: 53°23′8″N 16°5′22″E
- Country: Poland
- Voivodeship: West Pomeranian
- County: Drawsko
- Gmina: Wierzchowo
- Population: 720

Żabin [ˈʐabin] (formerly German Groß Sabin) is a village in the administrative district of Gmina Wierzchowo, within Drawsko County, West Pomeranian Voivodeship, in north-western Poland. It lies approximately 9 km (6 mi) south of Wierzchowo, 26 km (16 mi) south-east of Drawsko Pomorskie, and 101 km (63 mi) east of the regional capital Szczecin.

For the history of the region, see History of Pomerania.

The village has a population of 720.
