= Sikory, Drawsko County =

Sikory
- Village
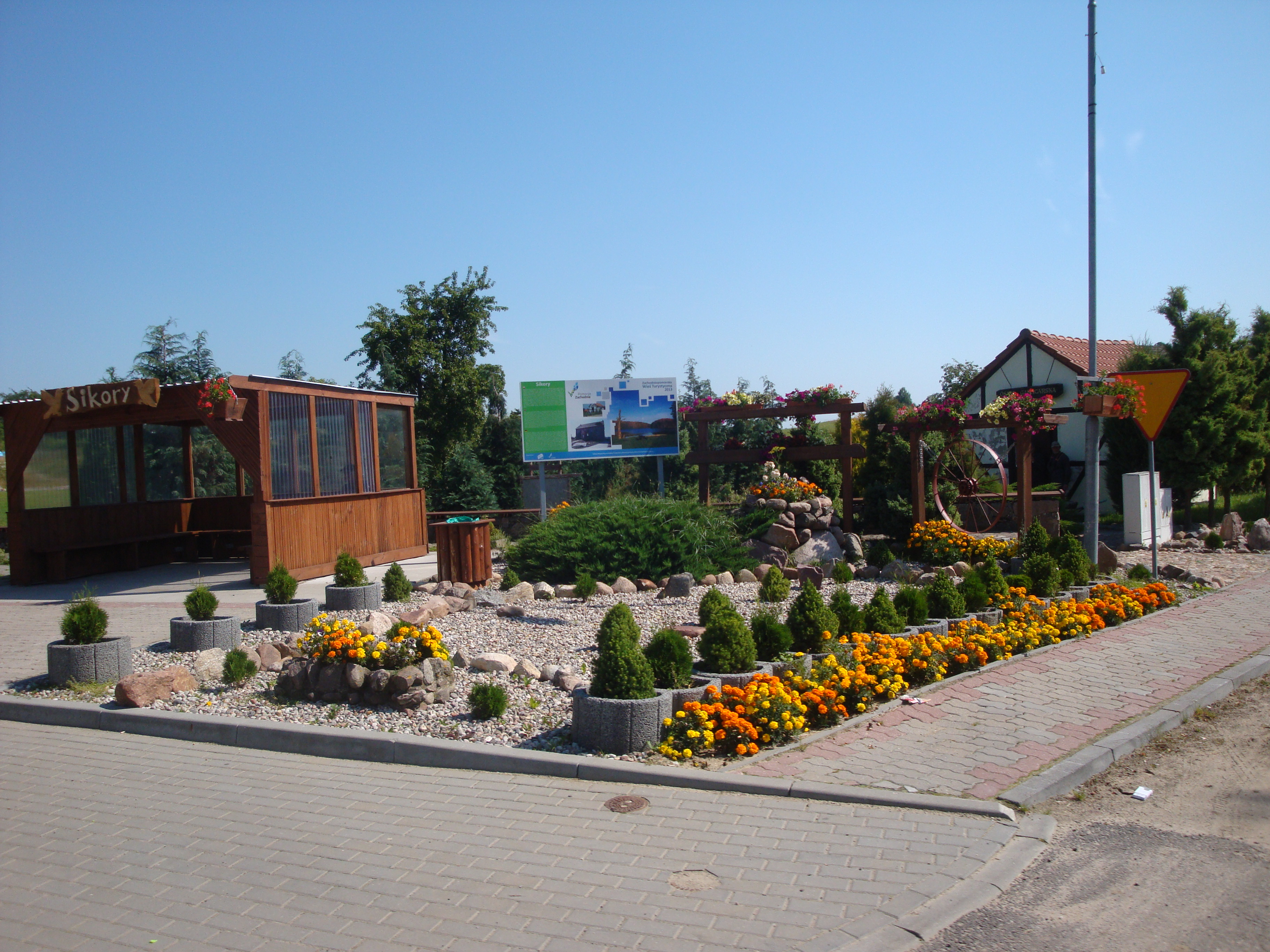
- Bus stop in village

- Location within Poland
- Coordinates: 53°36′N 16°15′E
- Country: Poland
- Voivodeship: West Pomeranian
- County: Drawsko
- Gmina: Czaplinek
- Time zone: UTC+1 (CET)
  - Summer (DST): UTC+2 (CEST)
- Area code: +48 94
- Car plates: ZDR

Sikory [ɕiˈkɔrɨ] (German: Zicker) is a village in the administrative district of Gmina Czaplinek, within Drawsko County, West Pomeranian Voivodeship, in north-western Poland. It lies approximately 6 km (4 mi) north of Czaplinek, 31 km (19 mi) east of Drawsko Pomorskie, and 113 km (70 mi) east of the regional capital Szczecin.

Before 1772 the area was part of Kingdom of Poland, 1772-1945 Prussia and Germany, before returning to Poland. It was a royal village of the Polish Crown. For more on its history, see Drahim County.

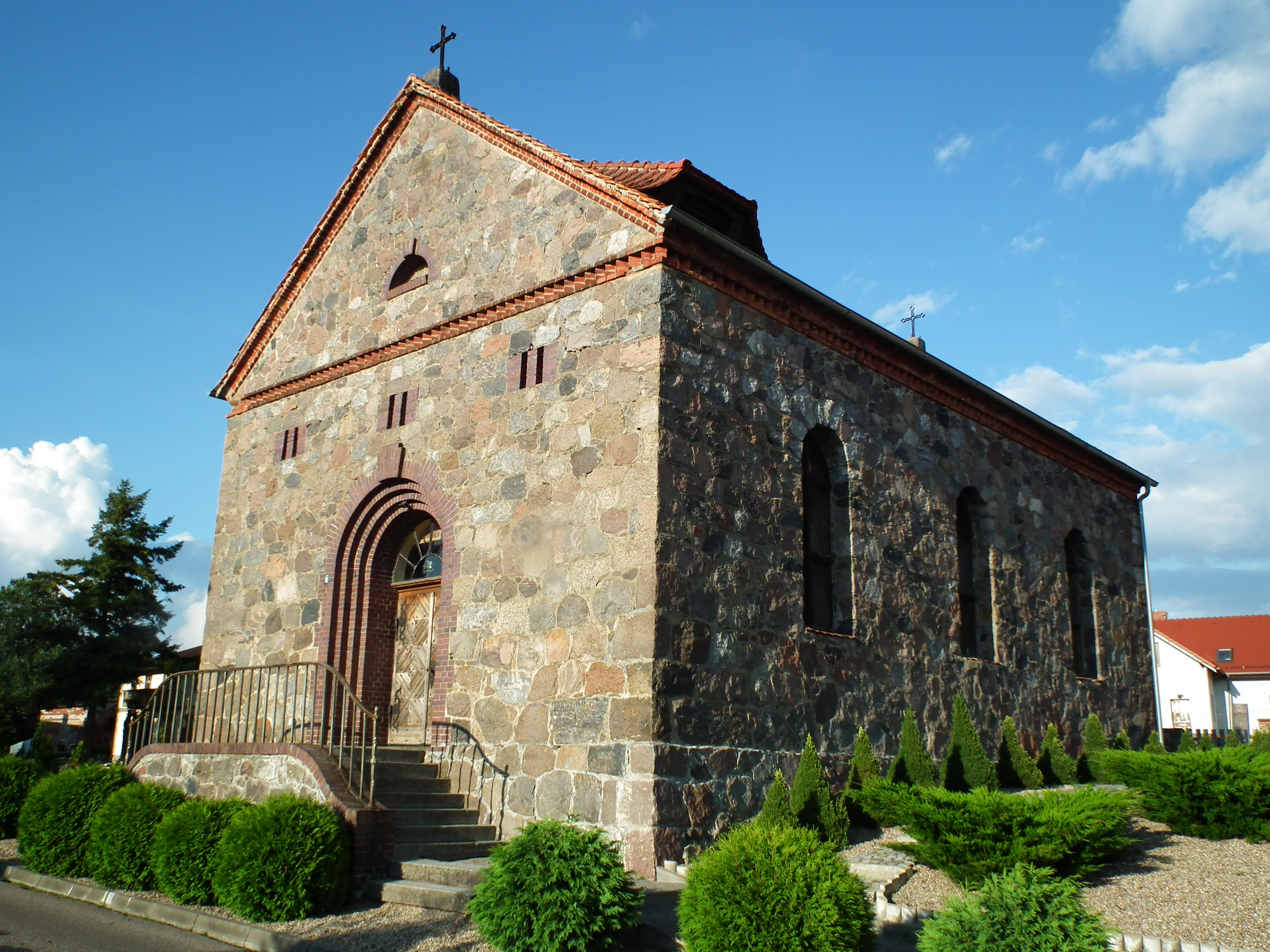
St. Stanislaus church in Sikory

The historic stone church of St. Stanislaus is located in the village.
