= Prosino =

- Village
- Location within Poland
- Coordinates: 53°39′0″N 16°12′45″E
- Country: Poland
- Voivodeship: West Pomeranian
- County: Drawsko
- Gmina: Czaplinek
- Time zone: UTC+1 (CET)
  - Summer (DST): UTC+2 (CEST)
- Area code: +48 94
- Car plates: ZDR

Prosino [prɔˈɕinɔ] (German: Prössin) is a village in the administrative district of Gmina Czaplinek, within Drawsko County, West Pomeranian Voivodeship, in north-western Poland. It lies approximately 12 km (7 mi) north of Czaplinek, 31 km (19 mi) north-east of Drawsko Pomorskie, and 111 km (69 mi) east of the regional capital Szczecin.

== See also ==
- Drahim County
- History of Pomerania
