= Osiek Drawski =

- Village
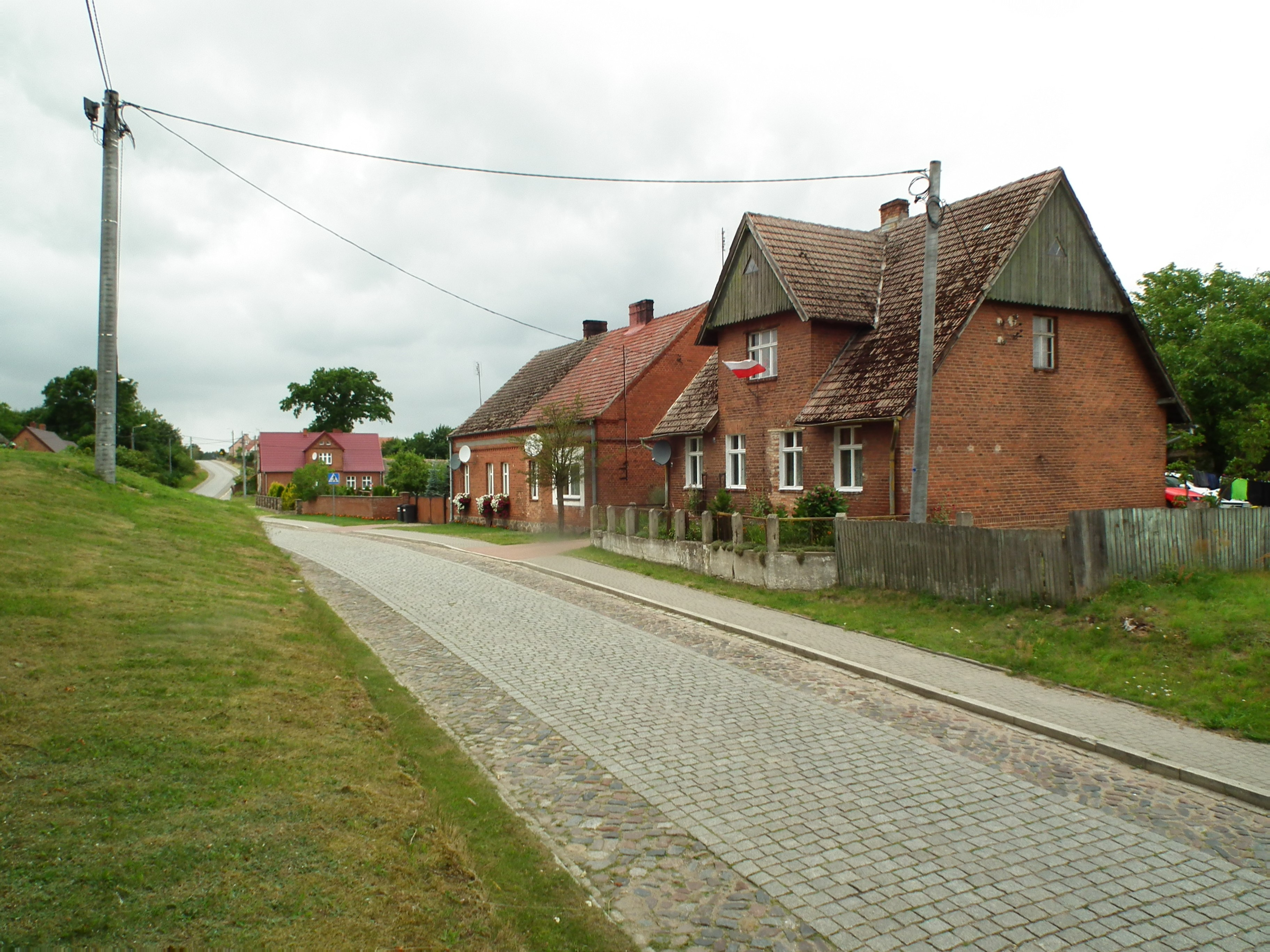

- Location within Poland
- Coordinates: 53°29′N 16°3′E
- Country: Poland
- Voivodeship: West Pomeranian
- County: Drawsko
- Gmina: Wierzchowo

Population
  - Total: 380
- Time zone: UTC+1 (CET)
  - Summer (DST): UTC+2 (CEST)

Osiek Drawski [ˈɔɕɛk ˈdrafski] (German: Wutzig) is a village in the administrative district of Gmina Wierzchowo, within Drawsko County, West Pomeranian Voivodeship, in north-western Poland. It lies approximately 5 km (3 mi) north-west of Wierzchowo, 18 km (11 mi) east of Drawsko Pomorskie, and 98 km (61 mi) east of the regional capital Szczecin.

The village has a population of 380.

== History ==
During World War II, the Germans operated a forced labour subcamp of the Stalag II-D prisoner-of-war camp in the village.
