= Wierzchówko =

- Settlement
- Location within Poland
- Coordinates: 53°27′40″N 16°7′39″E
- Country: Poland
- Voivodeship: West Pomeranian
- County: Drawsko
- Gmina: Wierzchowo

Wierzchówko [vjɛʂˈxufkɔ] is a settlement in the administrative district of Gmina Wierzchowo, within Drawsko County, West Pomeranian Voivodeship, in north-western Poland. It lies approximately 2 km (1 mi) east of Wierzchowo, 24 km (15 mi) east of Drawsko Pomorskie, and 103 km (64 mi) east of the regional capital Szczecin.

For the history of the region, see History of Pomerania.
