= Dębniewice =

- Village
- Location within Poland
- Coordinates: 53°28′27″N 16°19′10″E
- Country: Poland
- Voivodeship: West Pomeranian
- County: Drawsko
- Gmina: Wierzchowo
- Population: 18

Dębniewice [dɛmbɲɛˈvit͡sɛ] (German: Eichenberg) is a village in the administrative district of Gmina Wierzchowo, within Drawsko County, West Pomeranian Voivodeship, in north-western Poland. It lies approximately 15 km (9 mi) east of Wierzchowo, 36 km (22 mi) east of Drawsko Pomorskie, and 116 km (72 mi) east of the regional capital Szczecin.

For the history of the region, see History of Pomerania.

The village has a population of 18.
