= Karsno =

- Village
- Location within Poland
- Coordinates: 53°34′21″N 16°17′50″E
- Country: Poland
- Voivodeship: West Pomeranian
- County: Drawsko
- Gmina: Czaplinek
- Population: 200
- Time zone: UTC+1 (CET)
  - Summer (DST): UTC+2 (CEST)
- Area code: +48 94
- Car plates: ZDR

Karsno [ˈkarsnɔ] (German: Karsbaum) is a village in the administrative district of Gmina Czaplinek, within Drawsko County, West Pomeranian Voivodeship, in north-western Poland. It lies approximately 5 km (3 mi) north-east of Czaplinek, 34 km (21 mi) east of Drawsko Pomorskie, and 115 km (71 mi) east of the regional capital Szczecin.

The village has a population of 200.

Before 1772 the area was part of Kingdom of Poland, 1772–1871 Prussia, 1871–1945 Germany. For more on its history, see Drahim County.
