= Nowe Laski =

- Village
- Location within Poland
- Coordinates: 53°24′N 16°9′E
- Country: Poland
- Voivodeship: West Pomeranian
- County: Drawsko
- Gmina: Wierzchowo
- Population: 120

Nowe Laski (Polish pronunciation: [ˈnɔvɛ ˈlaskʲi], translation: "New Chicks"; German: Neu Latzig) is a village in the administrative district of Gmina Wierzchowo, within Drawsko County, West Pomeranian Voivodeship, in north-western Poland. It lies approximately 8 km (5 mi) south-east of Wierzchowo, 28 km (17 mi) south-east of Drawsko Pomorskie, and 104 km (65 mi) east of the regional capital Szczecin.

For the history of the region, see History of Pomerania.

The village has a population of 120.
