= Bonin, Drawsko County =

Bonin
- Village
- Location within Poland
- Coordinates: 53°28′47″N 16°1′27″E
- Country: Poland
- Voivodeship: West Pomeranian
- County: Drawsko
- Gmina: Wierzchowo
- Population: 30

Bonin [ˈbɔnin] is a village in the administrative district of Gmina Wierzchowo, within Drawsko County, West Pomeranian Voivodeship, in north-western Poland. It lies approximately 6 km (4 mi) north-west of Wierzchowo, 16 km (10 mi) east of Drawsko Pomorskie, and 96 km (60 mi) east of the regional capital Szczecin.

For the history of the region, see History of Pomerania.

The village has a population of 30.
