= Piekary, West Pomeranian Voivodeship =

Piekary
- Village
- Location within Poland
- Coordinates: 53°32′32″N 16°15′46″E
- Country: Poland
- Voivodeship: West Pomeranian
- County: Drawsko
- Gmina: Czaplinek
- Population: 70

Piekary [pjɛˈkarɨ] is a village in the administrative district of Gmina Czaplinek, within Drawsko County, West Pomeranian Voivodeship, in north-western Poland. It lies approximately 3 km (2 mi) south-east of Czaplinek, 31 km (19 mi) east of Drawsko Pomorskie, and 113 km (70 mi) east of the regional capital Szczecin.

Before 1772 the area was part of Kingdom of Poland, 1772-1945 Prussia and Germany. For more on its history, see Drahim County and History of Pomerania.

The village has a population of 70.
