= Wielboki =

- Village
- Location within Poland
- Coordinates: 53°25′N 16°18′E
- Country: Poland
- Voivodeship: West Pomeranian
- County: Drawsko
- Gmina: Wierzchowo
- Population: 120

Wielboki [vjɛlˈbɔki] (German: Deutsch Fuhlbeck) is a village in the administrative district of Gmina Wierzchowo, within Drawsko County, West Pomeranian Voivodeship, in north-western Poland. It lies approximately 15 km (9 mi) east of Wierzchowo, 36 km (22 mi) east of Drawsko Pomorskie, and 114 km (71 mi) east of the regional capital Szczecin.

For the history of the region, see History of Pomerania.

The village has a population of 120.
