= Otrzep =

- Village
- Location within Poland
- Coordinates: 53°25′N 16°14′E
- Country: Poland
- Voivodeship: West Pomeranian
- County: Drawsko
- Gmina: Wierzchowo
- Population: 70

Otrzep [ˈɔtʂɛp] (German: Friedrichshorst) is a village in the administrative district of Gmina Wierzchowo, within Drawsko County, West Pomeranian Voivodeship, in north-western Poland. It lies approximately 10 km (6 mi) south-east of Wierzchowo, 32 km (20 mi) south-east of Drawsko Pomorskie, and 110 km (68 mi) east of the regional capital Szczecin.

For the history of the region, see History of Pomerania.

The village has a population of 70.
