= Prosinko =

- Village
- Location within Poland
- Coordinates: 53°38′N 16°13′E
- Country: Poland
- Voivodeship: West Pomeranian
- County: Drawsko
- Gmina: Czaplinek
- Time zone: UTC+1 (CET)
  - Summer (DST): UTC+2 (CEST)
- Area code: +48 94
- Car plates: ZDR

Prosinko [prɔˈɕinkɔ] (German: Neudorf) is a village in the administrative district of Gmina Czaplinek, within Drawsko County, West Pomeranian Voivodeship, in north-western Poland. It lies approximately 10 km (6 mi) north of Czaplinek, 30 km (19 mi) east of Drawsko Pomorskie, and 111 km (69 mi) east of the regional capital Szczecin.
