= Kluczewo-Kolonia =

- Settlement
- Country: Poland
- Voivodeship: West Pomeranian
- County: Drawsko
- Gmina: Czaplinek
- Time zone: UTC+01:00 (CET)
  - Summer (DST): UTC+02:00 (CEST)
- Area code: +48 94
- Car plates: ZDR

Kluczewo-Kolonia [kluˈt͡ʂɛvɔ kɔˈlɔɲa] is a settlement in the administrative district of Gmina Czaplinek, within Drawsko County, West Pomeranian Voivodeship, in north-western Poland.
