= Buszcze =

- Settlement
- Location within Poland
- Coordinates: 53°32′N 16°19′E
- Country: Poland
- Voivodeship: West Pomeranian
- County: Drawsko
- Gmina: Czaplinek
- Time zone: UTC+1 (CET)
  - Summer (DST): UTC+2 (CEST)
- Area code: +48 94
- Car plates: ZDR

Buszcze [ˈbuʂt͡ʂɛ] (German: Buschhof) is a settlement in the administrative district of Gmina Czaplinek, within Drawsko County, West Pomeranian Voivodeship, in north-western Poland. It lies approximately 6 km (4 mi) east of Czaplinek, 35 km (22 mi) east of Drawsko Pomorskie, and 116 km (72 mi) east of the regional capital Szczecin.
