= Czarne Małe, West Pomeranian Voivodeship =

Czarne Małe
- Village
- Location within Poland
- Coordinates: 53°33′N 16°20′E
- Country: Poland
- Voivodeship: West Pomeranian
- County: Drawsko
- Gmina: Czaplinek
- Time zone: UTC+1 (CET)
  - Summer (DST): UTC+2 (CEST)
- Area code: +48 94
- Car plates: ZDR
- Website: http://wrota.czaplinek.pl/content/view/5/15/

Czarne Małe [ˈt͡ʂarnɛ ˈmawɛ] (German: Klein Schwarzsee) is a village in the administrative district of Gmina Czaplinek, within Drawsko County, West Pomeranian Voivodeship, in north-western Poland. It lies approximately 7 km (4 mi) east of Czaplinek, 36 km (22 mi) east of Drawsko Pomorskie, and 117 km (73 mi) east of the regional capital Szczecin.
