= Trzciniec, Drawsko County =

Trzciniec
- Village
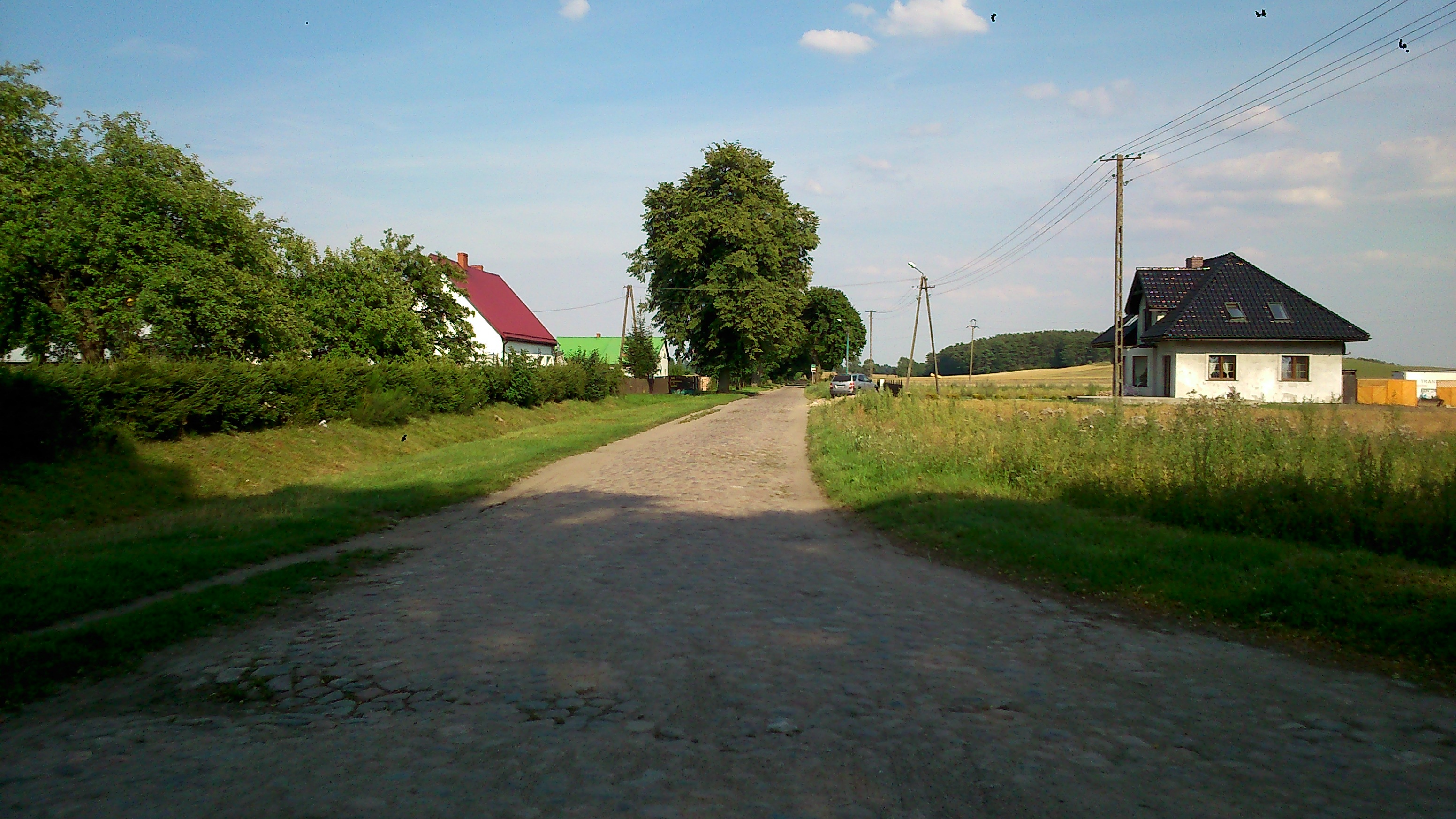

- Location within Poland
- Coordinates: 53°30′N 16°18′E
- Country: Poland
- Voivodeship: West Pomeranian
- County: Drawsko
- Gmina: Czaplinek
- Time zone: UTC+1 (CET)
  - Summer (DST): UTC+2 (CEST)
- Area code: +48 94
- Car plates: ZDR

Trzciniec ([ˈtʂt͡ɕiɲɛt͡s]; German: Wassergrund) is a village in the administrative district of Gmina Czaplinek, within Drawsko County, West Pomeranian Voivodeship, in north-western Poland. It lies approximately 8 km (5 mi) south-east of Czaplinek, 34 km (21 mi) east of Drawsko Pomorskie, and 115 km (71 mi) east of the regional capital Szczecin.

A historic palace and park are located in the village.

== History ==
Within the Kingdom of Poland, the territory formed part of the Wałcz County in the Poznań Voivodeship in the Greater Poland Province.

== Gallery ==
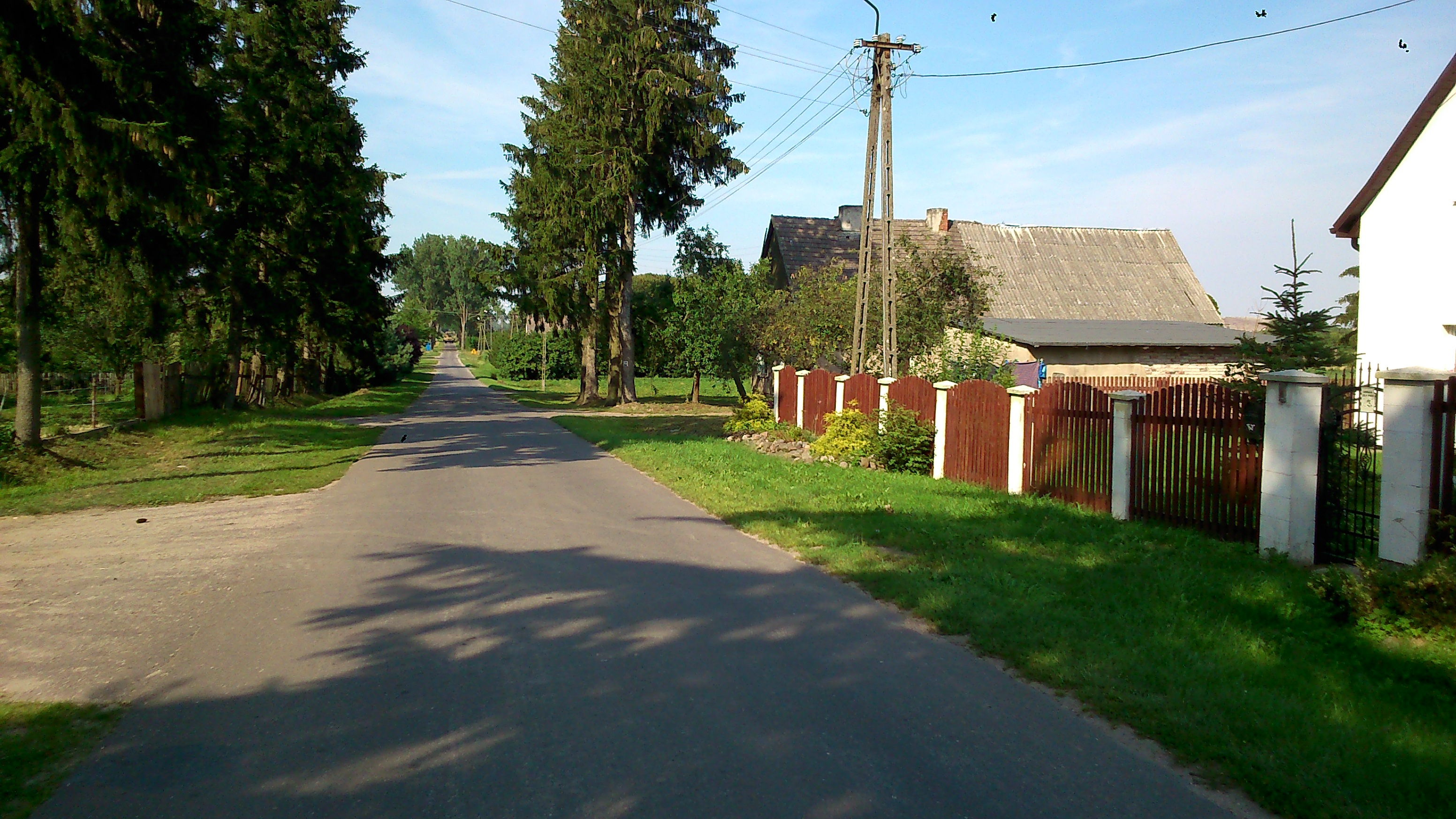

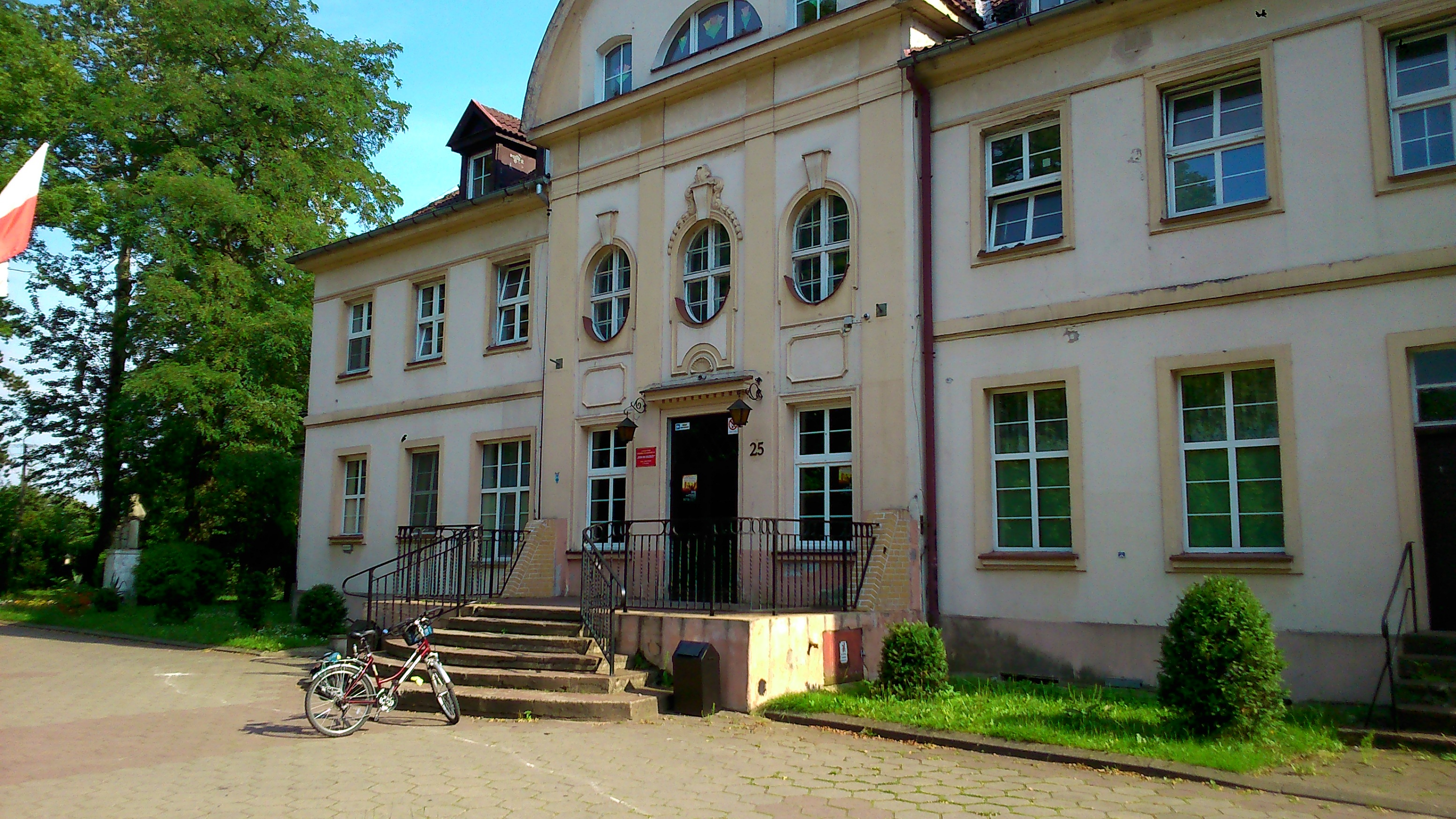
Palace in Trzciniec

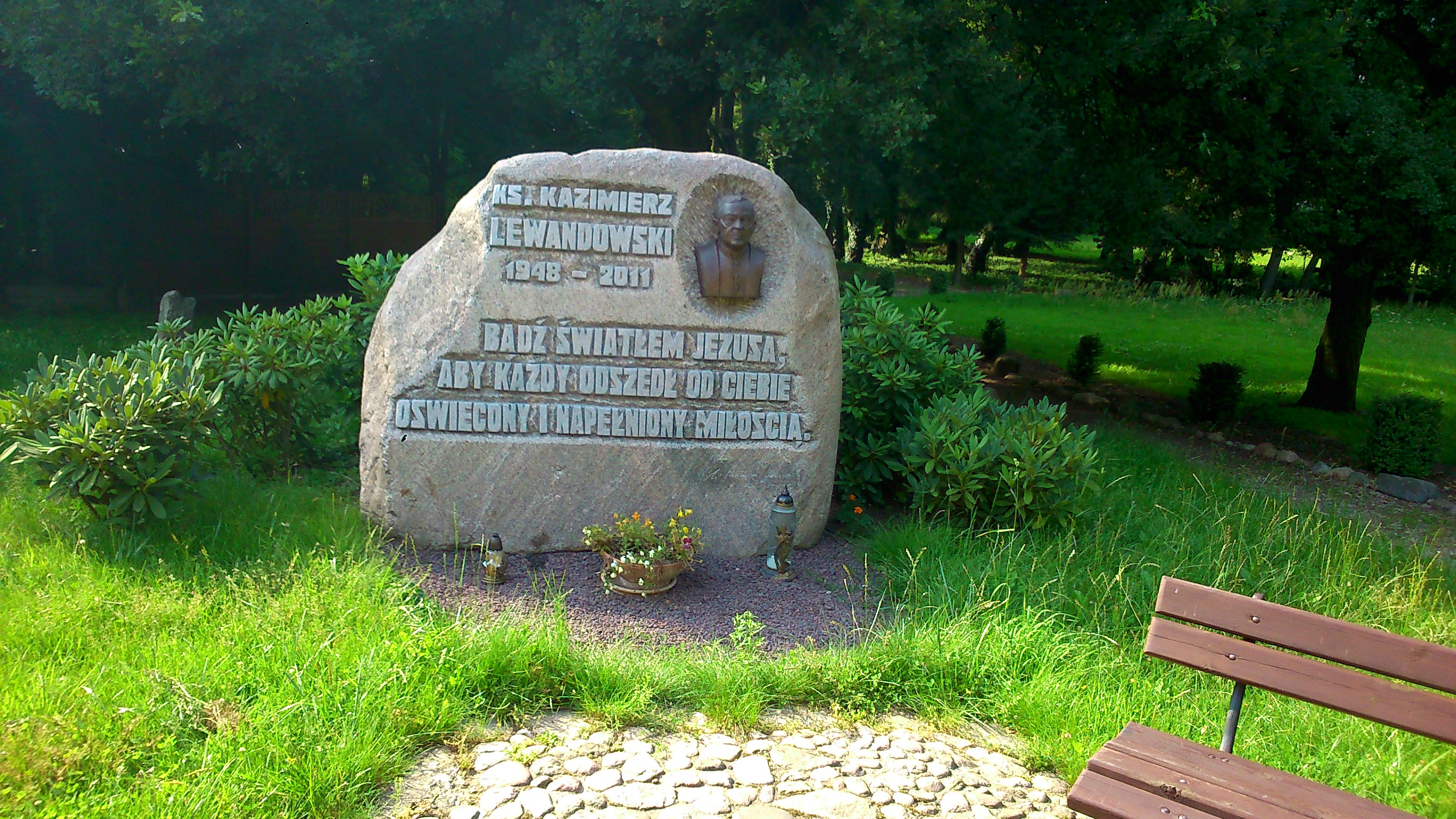
Memorial stone to priest Kazimierz Lewandowski
