= Psie Głowy =

- Village
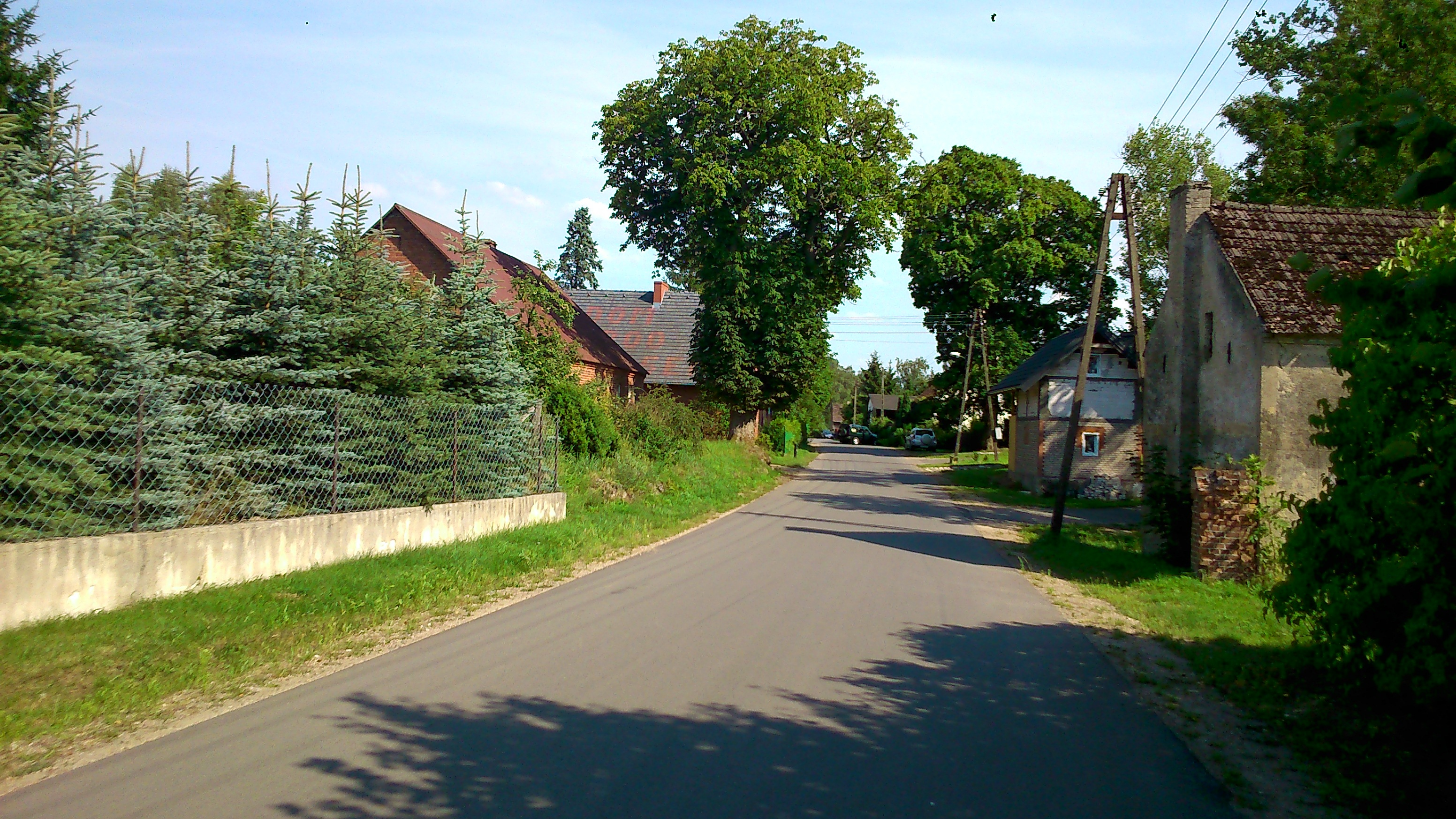

- Location within Poland
- Coordinates: 53°30′N 16°15′E
- Country: Poland
- Voivodeship: West Pomeranian
- County: Drawsko
- Gmina: Czaplinek
- Time zone: UTC+1 (CET)
  - Summer (DST): UTC+2 (CEST)
- Area code: +48 94
- Car plates: ZDR

Psie Głowy [ˈpɕɛ ˈɡwɔvɨ] (German: Hundskopf) is a village in the administrative district of Gmina Czaplinek, within Drawsko County, West Pomeranian Voivodeship, in north-western Poland. It lies approximately 6 km (4 mi) south of Czaplinek, 31 km (19 mi) east of Drawsko Pomorskie, and 111 km (69 mi) east of the regional capital Szczecin.
