= Rzepowo, West Pomeranian Voivodeship =

Rzepowo
- Village
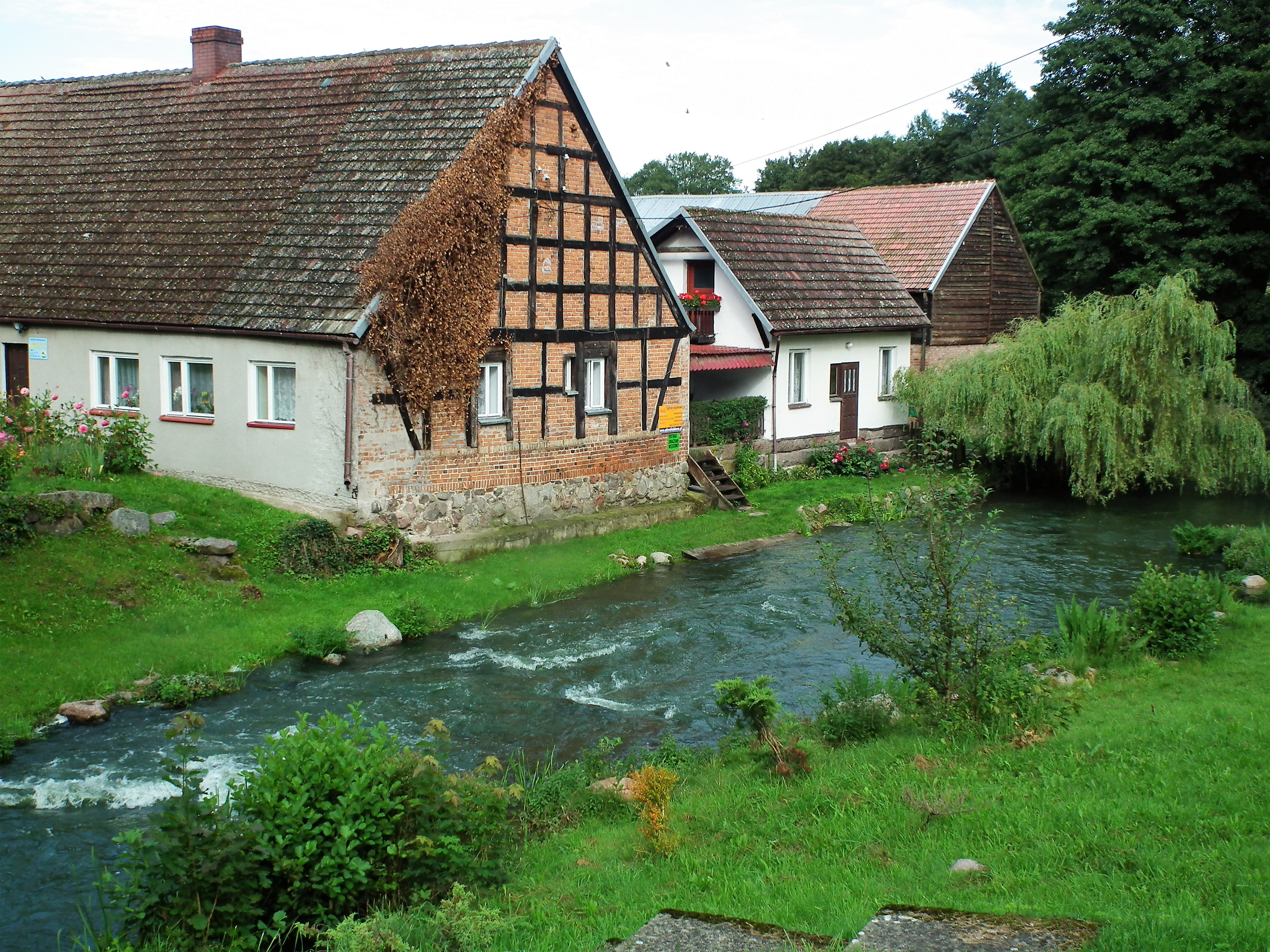

- Location within Poland
- Coordinates: 53°35′N 16°5′E
- Country: Poland
- Voivodeship: West Pomeranian
- County: Drawsko
- Gmina: Czaplinek
- Time zone: UTC+1 (CET)
  - Summer (DST): UTC+2 (CEST)
- Area code: +48 94
- Car plates: ZDR

Rzepowo [ʐɛˈpɔvɔ] (German: Reppow) is a village in the administrative district of Gmina Czaplinek, within Drawsko County, West Pomeranian Voivodeship, in north-western Poland. It lies approximately 11 km (7 mi) west of Czaplinek, 20 km (12 mi) east of Drawsko Pomorskie, and 102 km (63 mi) east of the regional capital Szczecin. It is situated on the Drawa River and Rzepowskie Lake.

The historic church of the Sacred Heart of Jesus is located in the village.

== History ==
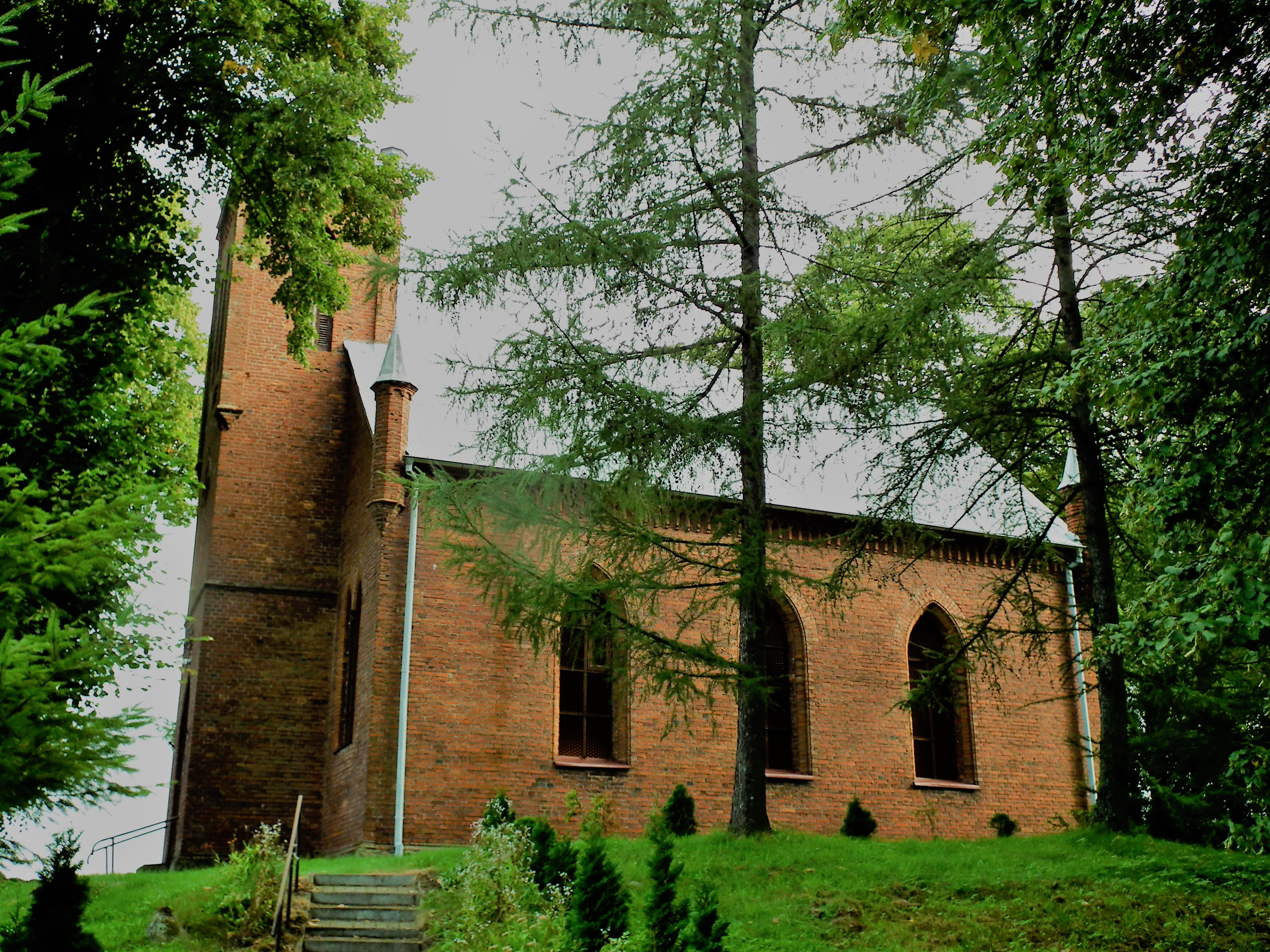
Sacred Heart church

The territory became a part of the emerging Polish state under its first historic ruler Mieszko I in the 10th century. Rzepowo was a private village of Polish nobility, administratively located in the Wałcz County in the Poznań Voivodeship in the Greater Poland Province of the Kingdom of Poland. It was annexed by Prussia in the First Partition of Poland in 1772, and from 1871 to 1945 it was also part of Germany.
