= Żerdno =

- Village
- Location within Poland
- Coordinates: 53°37′N 16°13′E
- Country: Poland
- Voivodeship: West Pomeranian
- County: Drawsko
- Gmina: Czaplinek
- Time zone: UTC+1 (CET)
  - Summer (DST): UTC+2 (CEST)
- Area code: +48 94
- Car plates: ZDR

Żerdno [ˈʐɛrdnɔ] (German: Schneidemühl) is a village in the administrative district of Gmina Czaplinek, within Drawsko County, West Pomeranian Voivodeship, in north-western Poland. It lies approximately 8 km (5 mi) north of Czaplinek, 30 km (19 mi) east of Drawsko Pomorskie, and 111 km (69 mi) east of the regional capital Szczecin.
