= Brzezinka, West Pomeranian Voivodeship =

Brzezinka
- Settlement
- Location within Poland
- Coordinates: 53°40′24″N 16°10′46″E
- Country: Poland
- Voivodeship: West Pomeranian
- County: Drawsko
- Gmina: Czaplinek
- Time zone: UTC+1 (CET)
  - Summer (DST): UTC+2 (CEST)
- Area code: +48 94
- Car plates: ZDR

Brzezinka (Polish: [bʐɛˈʑiŋka]; German: Lehmaningen) is a settlement in the administrative district of Gmina Czaplinek, within Drawsko County, West Pomeranian Voivodeship, in north-western Poland. It lies approximately 15 km (9 mi) north of Czaplinek, 30 km (19 mi) north-east of Drawsko Pomorskie, and 110 km (68 mi) east of the regional capital Szczecin.
