= Nowa Wieś, West Pomeranian Voivodeship =

Nowa Wieś
- Village
- Location within Poland
- Coordinates: 53°27′14″N 16°23′24″E
- Country: Poland
- Voivodeship: West Pomeranian
- County: Drawsko
- Gmina: Czaplinek
- Time zone: UTC+1 (CET)
  - Summer (DST): UTC+2 (CEST)
- Area code: +48 94
- Car plates: ZDR

Nowa Wieś [ˈnɔva ˈvjɛɕ] (German: Schönhölzig) is a village in the administrative district of Gmina Czaplinek, within Drawsko County, West Pomeranian Voivodeship, in north-western Poland. It lies approximately 15 km (9 mi) south-east of Czaplinek, 41 km (25 mi) east of Drawsko Pomorskie, and 120 km (75 mi) east of the regional capital Szczecin.

== History ==
The territory became a part of the emerging Polish state under its first historic ruler Mieszko I in the 10th century. It was a private village of Polish nobility, administratively located in the Wałcz County in the Poznań Voivodeship in the Greater Poland Province of the Kingdom of Poland.
