= Kołomąt =

- Village
- Location within Poland
- Coordinates: 53°35′12″N 16°13′0″E
- Country: Poland
- Voivodeship: West Pomeranian
- County: Drawsko
- Gmina: Czaplinek
- Time zone: UTC+1 (CET)
  - Summer (DST): UTC+2 (CEST)
- Area code: +48 94
- Car plates: ZDR

Kołomąt [kɔˈwɔmɔnt] is a village in the administrative district of Gmina Czaplinek, within Drawsko County, West Pomeranian Voivodeship, in north-western Poland. It lies approximately 5 km (3 mi) north of Czaplinek, 29 km (18 mi) east of Drawsko Pomorskie, and 110 km (68 mi) east of the regional capital Szczecin.

Before 1945 the village was German-settled and part of the German state of Prussia.
