= Sulibórz, Drawsko County =

Sulibórz
- Village
- Location within Poland
- Coordinates: 53°37′34″N 16°10′33″E
- Country: Poland
- Voivodeship: West Pomeranian
- County: Drawsko
- Gmina: Czaplinek
- Population: 3
- Time zone: UTC+1 (CET)
  - Summer (DST): UTC+2 (CEST)
- Area code: +48 94
- Car plates: ZDR

Sulibórz [suˈlibuʂ] (German: Carlshoff) is a village in the administrative district of Gmina Czaplinek, within Drawsko County, West Pomeranian Voivodeship, in north-western Poland. It lies approximately 10 km (6 mi) north-west of Czaplinek, 27 km (17 mi) north-east of Drawsko Pomorskie, and 108 km (67 mi) east of the regional capital Szczecin.

The village has a population of 3.
