= Żelisławie =

- Village
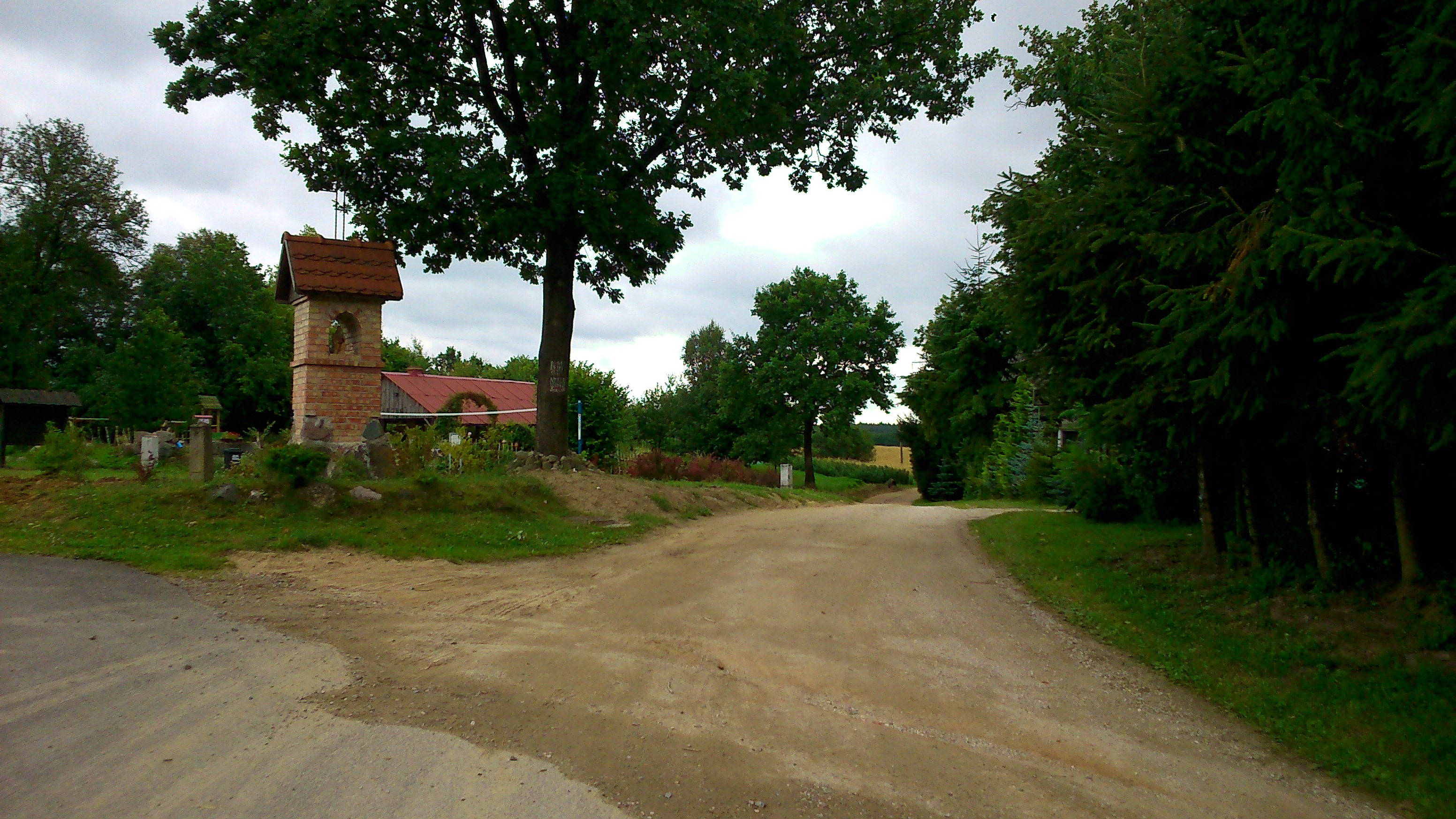

- Location within Poland
- Coordinates: 53°32′N 16°9′E
- Country: Poland
- Voivodeship: West Pomeranian
- County: Drawsko
- Gmina: Czaplinek
- Population: 130
- Time zone: UTC+1 (CET)
  - Summer (DST): UTC+2 (CEST)
- Area code: +48 94
- Car plates: ZDR

Żelisławie [ʐɛliˈswavjɛ] (German: Ravensberg) is a village in the administrative district of Gmina Czaplinek, within Drawsko County, West Pomeranian Voivodeship, in north-western Poland. It lies approximately 6 km (4 mi) west of Czaplinek, 24 km (15 mi) east of Drawsko Pomorskie, and 105 km (65 mi) east of the regional capital Szczecin. The village has a population of 130.
