= Stare Gonne =

- Village
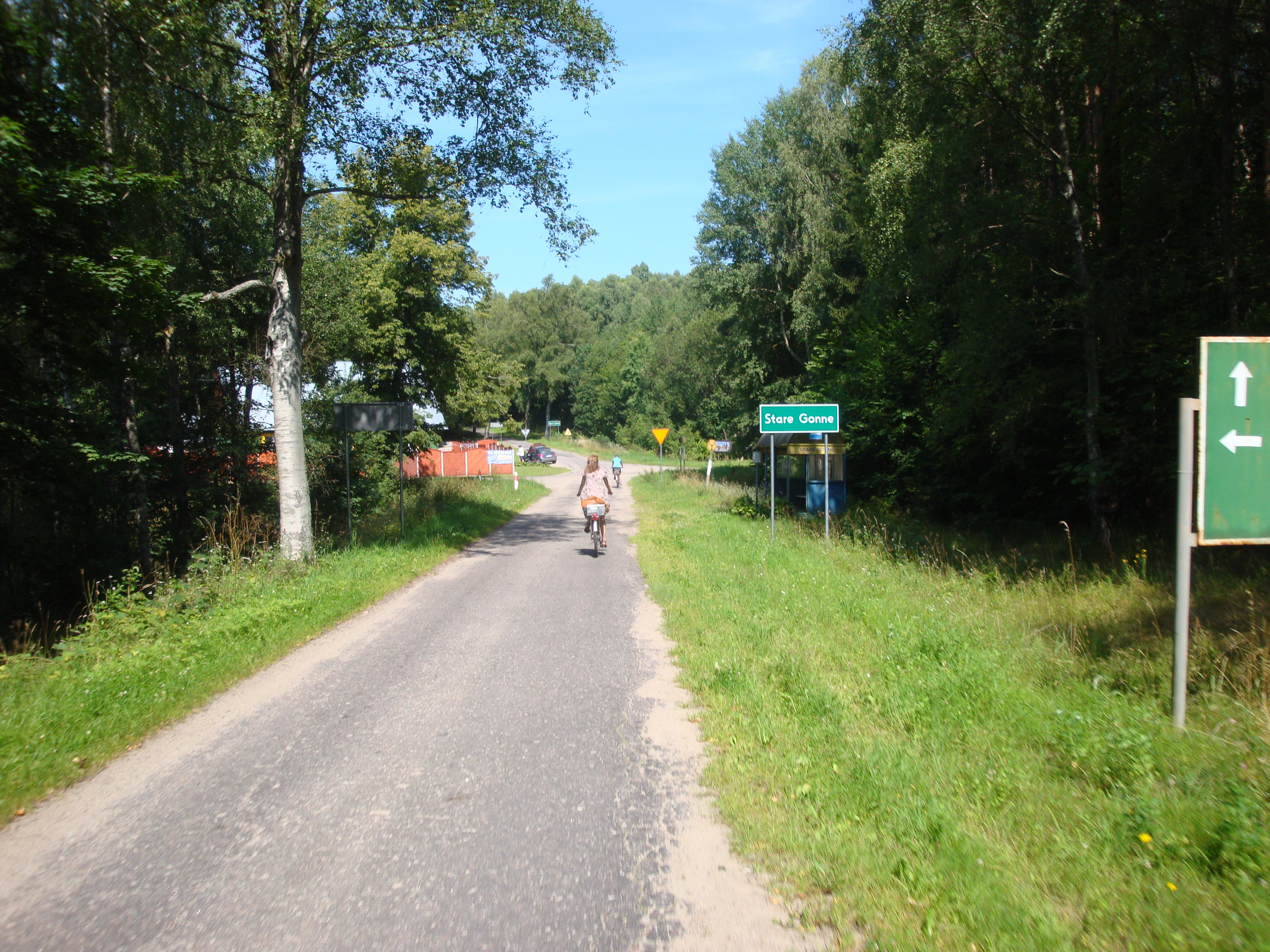

- Location within Poland
- Coordinates: 53°40′23″N 16°14′38″E
- Country: Poland
- Voivodeship: West Pomeranian
- County: Drawsko
- Gmina: Czaplinek
- Time zone: UTC+1 (CET)
  - Summer (DST): UTC+2 (CEST)
- Postal code: 78-552
- Area code: +48 94
- Vehicle registration: ZDR

Stare Gonne [ˈstarɛ ˈɡɔnnɛ] is a village in the administrative district of Gmina Czaplinek, within Drawsko County, West Pomeranian Voivodeship, in north-western Poland. It lies approximately 14 km (9 mi) north of Czaplinek, 34 km (21 mi) north-east of Drawsko Pomorskie, and 114 km (71 mi) east of the regional capital Szczecin.
