= Piaseczno, Drawsko County =

Piaseczno
- Village
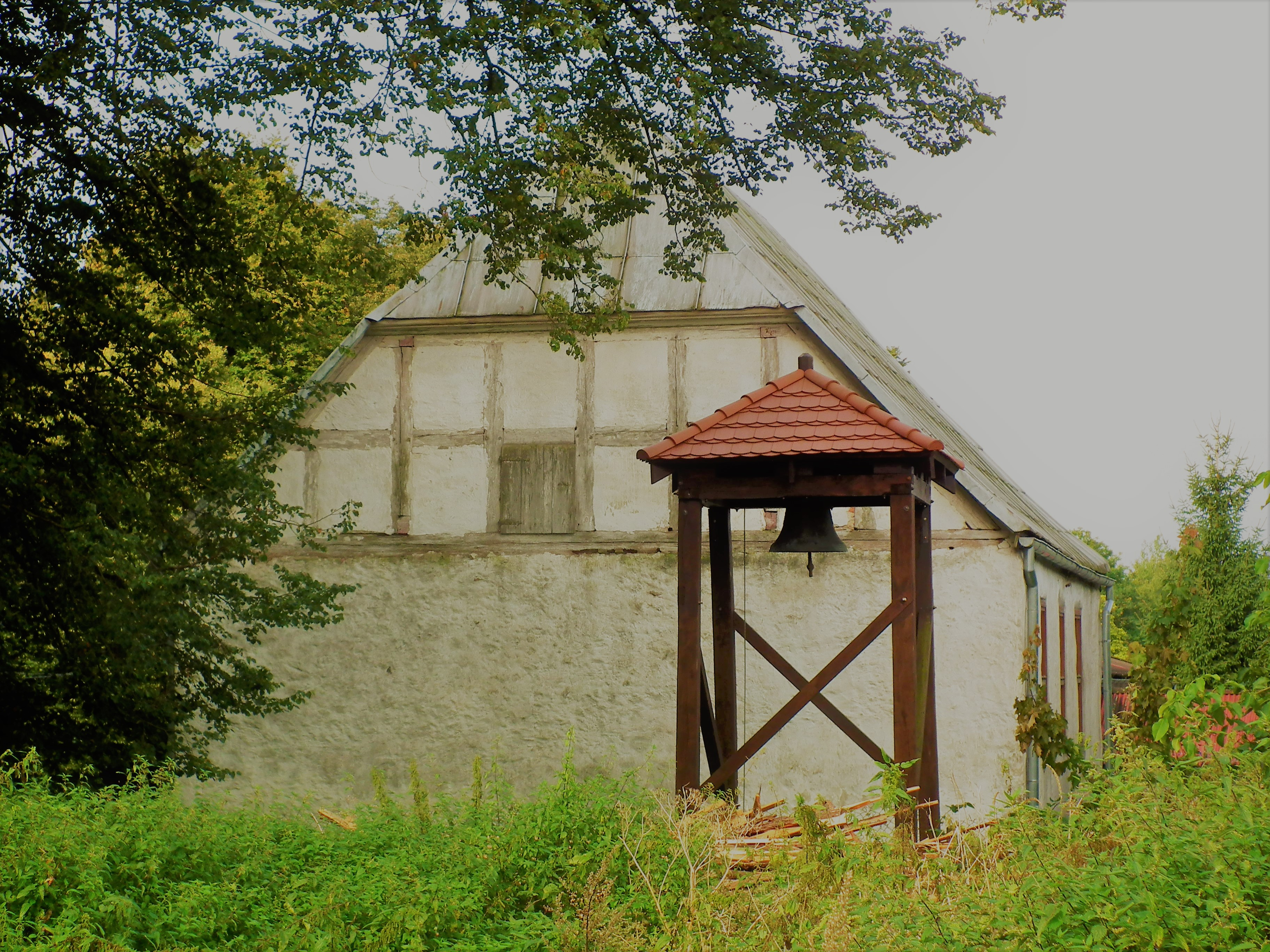
- Church of Our Lady Help of Christians, formerly a Protestant church

- Location within Poland
- Coordinates: 53°35′N 16°8′E
- Country: Poland
- Voivodeship: West Pomeranian
- County: Drawsko
- Gmina: Czaplinek

Piaseczno [pjaˈsɛt͡ʂnɔ] (German: Blumenwerder) is a village in the administrative district of Gmina Czaplinek, within Drawsko County, West Pomeranian Voivodeship, in north-western Poland. It lies approximately 8 km (5 mi) north-west of Czaplinek, 23 km (14 mi) east of Drawsko Pomorskie, and 105 km (65 mi) east of the regional capital Szczecin.

Before 1772 the area was part of Kingdom of Poland, 1772-1945 Prussia and Germany. For more on its history, see Wałcz County and "Warlang-Heinrichsdorf Domain".
