= Wrześnica, Drawsko County =

Wrześnica
- Village
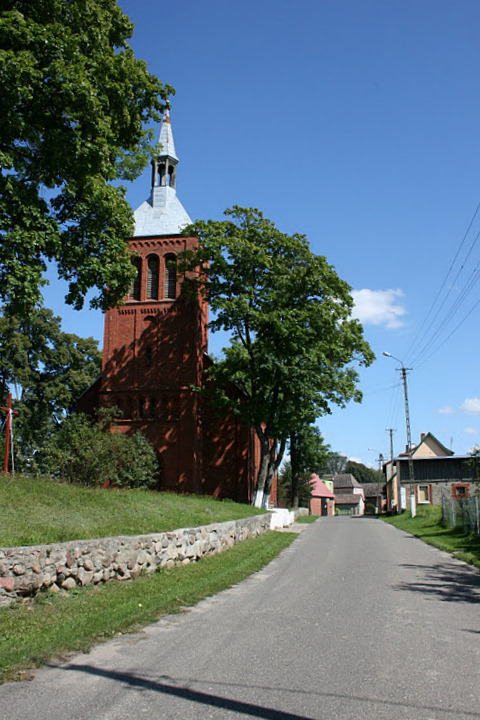
- Church in Wrześnica

- Location within Poland
- Coordinates: 53°33′6″N 16°10′15″E
- Country: Poland
- Voivodeship: West Pomeranian
- County: Drawsko
- Gmina: Czaplinek
- Population: 40
- Time zone: UTC+1 (CET)
  - Summer (DST): UTC+2 (CEST)
- Area code: +48 94
- Car plates: ZDR

Wrześnica [vʐɛɕˈnit͡sa] (German: Alt Wilhelmshof) is a village in the administrative district of Gmina Czaplinek, within Drawsko County, West Pomeranian Voivodeship, in north-western Poland. It lies approximately 5 km (3 mi) west of Czaplinek, 25 km (16 mi) east of Drawsko Pomorskie, and 107 km (66 mi) east of the regional capital Szczecin.

The village has a population of 40.

== Transport ==
The S6 expressway passes to the south of Wrześnica. Exit 33 of the S6 expressway provides quick access to Sławno and Słupsk.

Wrześnica lies on the main railway line between Gdańsk and Szczecin. Regional trains provide services to Sławno and Słupsk.
