= Broczyno =

- Village
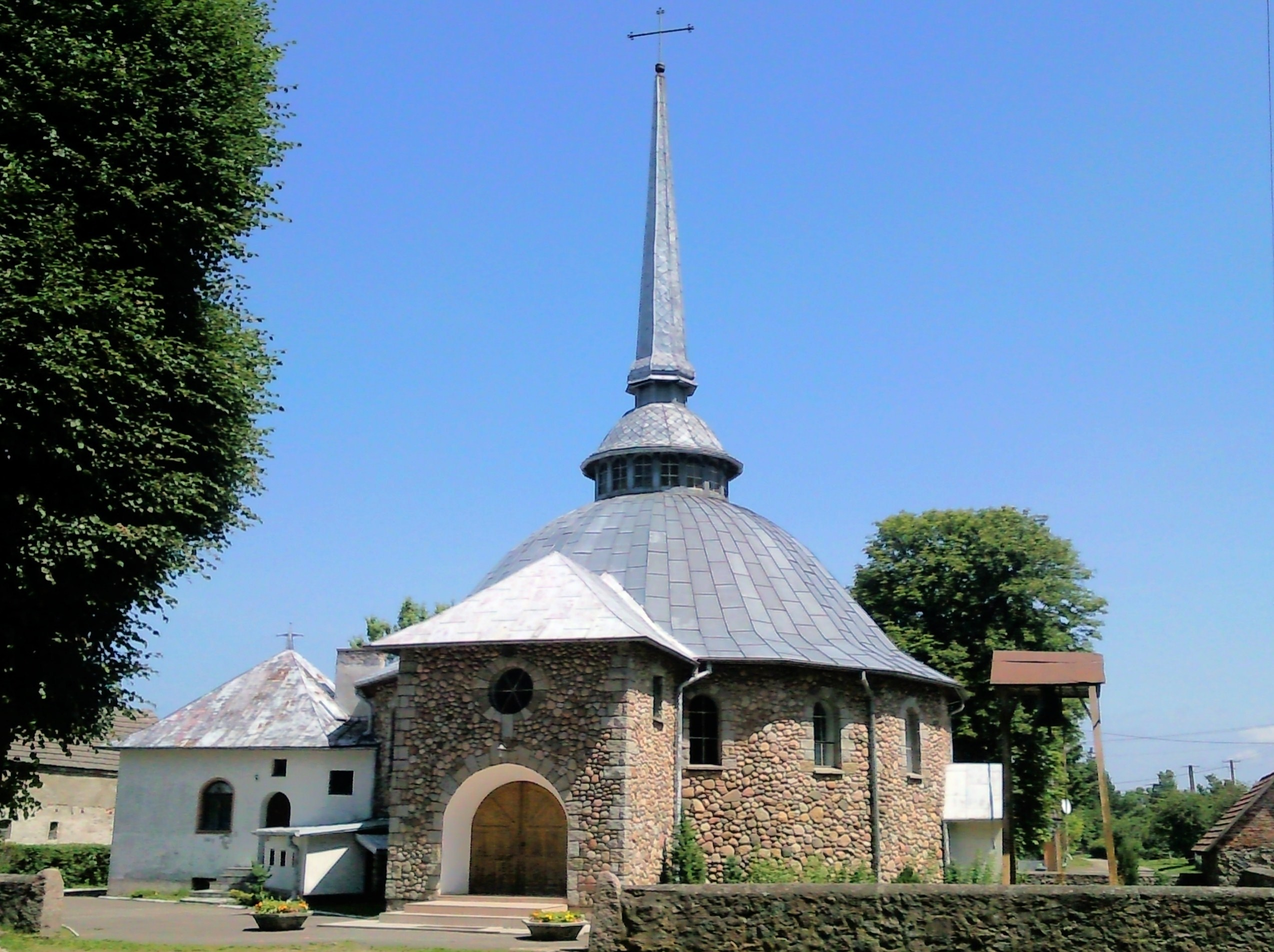
- Church in Broczyno

- Location within Poland
- Coordinates: 53°31′27″N 16°18′36″E
- Country: Poland
- Voivodeship: West Pomeranian
- County: Drawsko
- Gmina: Czaplinek
- Time zone: UTC+1 (CET)
  - Summer (DST): UTC+2 (CEST)
- Area code: +48 94
- Car plates: ZDR

Broczyno [brɔˈt͡ʂɨnɔ] (German: Brotzen) is a village in the administrative district of Gmina Czaplinek, within Drawsko County, West Pomeranian Voivodeship, in north-western Poland. It lies approximately 6 km (4 mi) south-east of Czaplinek, 34 km (21 mi) east of Drawsko Pomorskie, and 116 km (72 mi) east of the regional capital Szczecin.

A historic Gothic Revival palace is located in Broczyno. The village also has an elementary school and a Catholic church.
