= Drahimek =

- Village
- Location within Poland
- Coordinates: 53°36′45″N 16°11′36″E
- Country: Poland
- Voivodeship: West Pomeranian
- County: Drawsko
- Gmina: Czaplinek
- Population (approx.): 30
- Time zone: UTC+1 (CET)
  - Summer (DST): UTC+2 (CEST)
- Area code: +48 94
- Car plates: ZDR

Drahimek [draˈximɛk] (German: Draheim) is a village in the administrative district of Gmina Czaplinek, within Drawsko County, West Pomeranian Voivodeship, in north-western Poland. It lies approximately 8 km (5 mi) north of Czaplinek, 28 km (17 mi) east of Drawsko Pomorskie, and 109 km (68 mi) east of the regional capital Szczecin.

The village has an approximate population of 30.
