= Byszkowo =

- Village
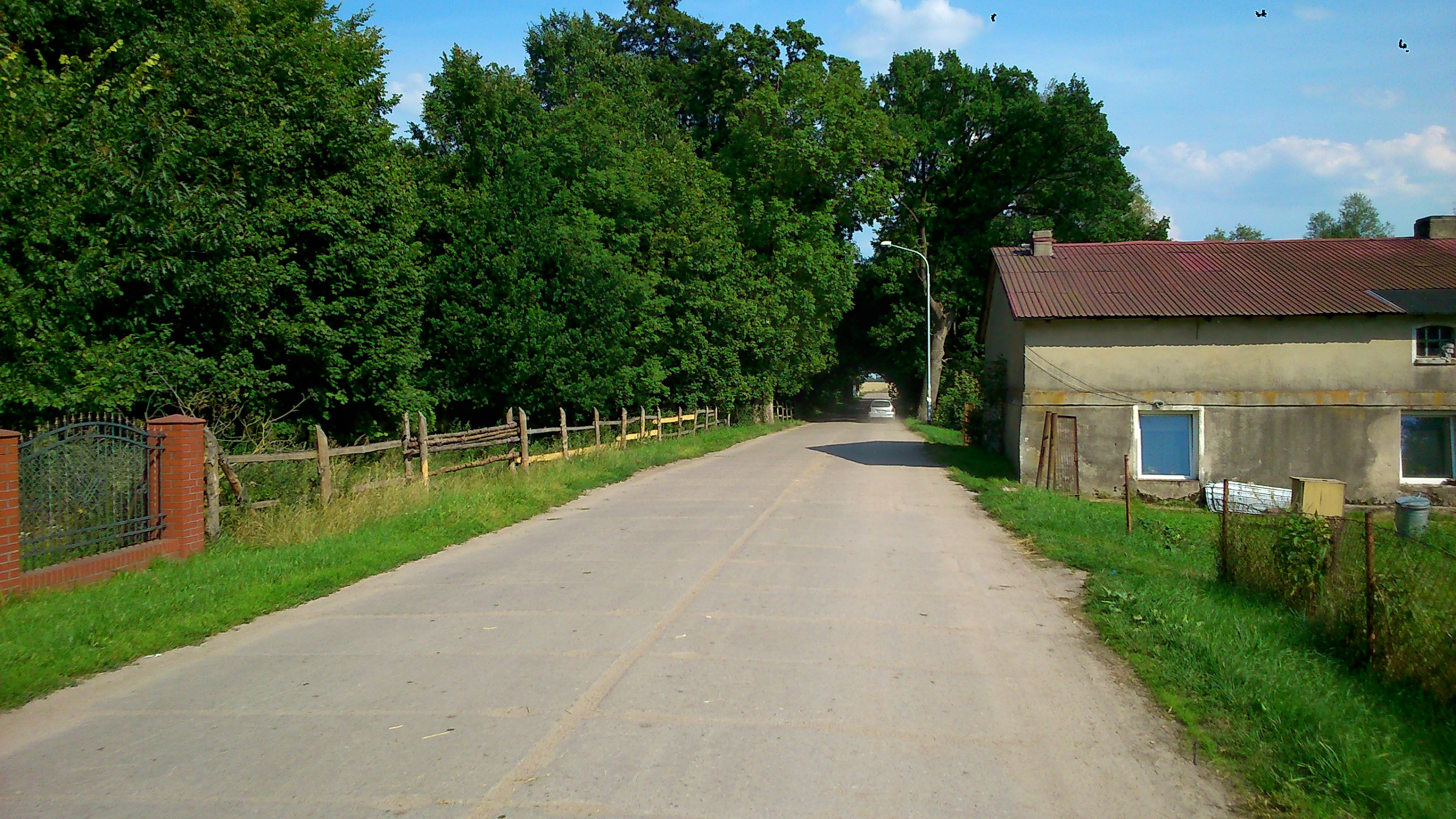

- Location within Poland
- Coordinates: 53°29′42″N 16°17′41″E
- Country: Poland
- Voivodeship: West Pomeranian
- County: Drawsko
- Gmina: Czaplinek
- Time zone: UTC+1 (CET)
  - Summer (DST): UTC+2 (CEST)
- Area code: +48 94
- Car plates: ZDR

Byszkowo ([bɨʂˈkɔvɔ]; German: Böskau) is a village in the administrative district of Gmina Czaplinek, within Drawsko County, West Pomeranian Voivodeship, in north-western Poland. It lies approximately 8 km (5 mi) south-east of Czaplinek, 34 km (21 mi) east of Drawsko Pomorskie, and 114 km (71 mi) east of the regional capital Szczecin.
