= Podstrzesze =

- Settlement
- Location within Poland
- Coordinates: 53°30′19″N 16°23′5″E
- Country: Poland
- Voivodeship: West Pomeranian
- County: Drawsko
- Gmina: Czaplinek
- Time zone: UTC+1 (CET)
  - Summer (DST): UTC+2 (CEST)
- Area code: +48 94
- Car plates: ZDR

Podstrzesze [pɔtsˈtʂɛʂɛ] (German: Niederhof) is a settlement in the administrative district of Gmina Czaplinek, within Drawsko County, West Pomeranian Voivodeship, in north-western Poland. It lies approximately 12 km (7 mi) south-east of Czaplinek, 39 km (24 mi) east of Drawsko Pomorskie, and 120 km (75 mi) east of the regional capital Szczecin.
