= Czarne Wielkie =

- Village
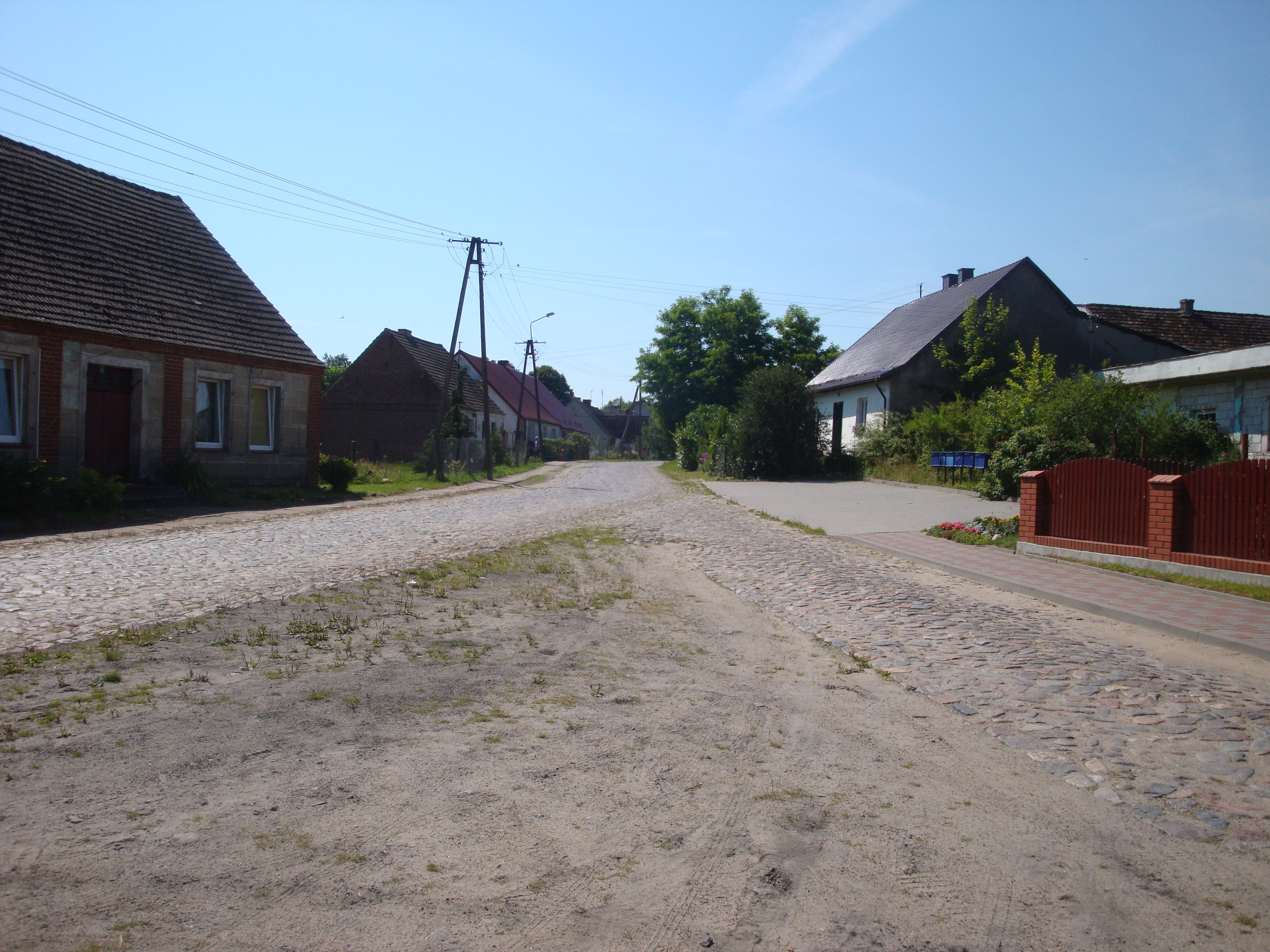

- Location within Poland
- Coordinates: 53°39′N 16°16′E
- Country: Poland
- Voivodeship: West Pomeranian
- County: Drawsko
- Gmina: Czaplinek
- Time zone: UTC+1 (CET)
  - Summer (DST): UTC+2 (CEST)
- Area code: +48 94
- Car plates: ZDR

Czarne Wielkie ([ˈt͡ʂarnɛ ˈvjɛlkʲɛ]; German: Groß Schwarzsee) is a village in the administrative district of Gmina Czaplinek, within Drawsko County, West Pomeranian Voivodeship, in north-western Poland. It lies approximately 12 km (7 mi) north of Czaplinek, 34 km (21 mi) north-east of Drawsko Pomorskie, and 115 km (71 mi) east of the regional capital Szczecin.

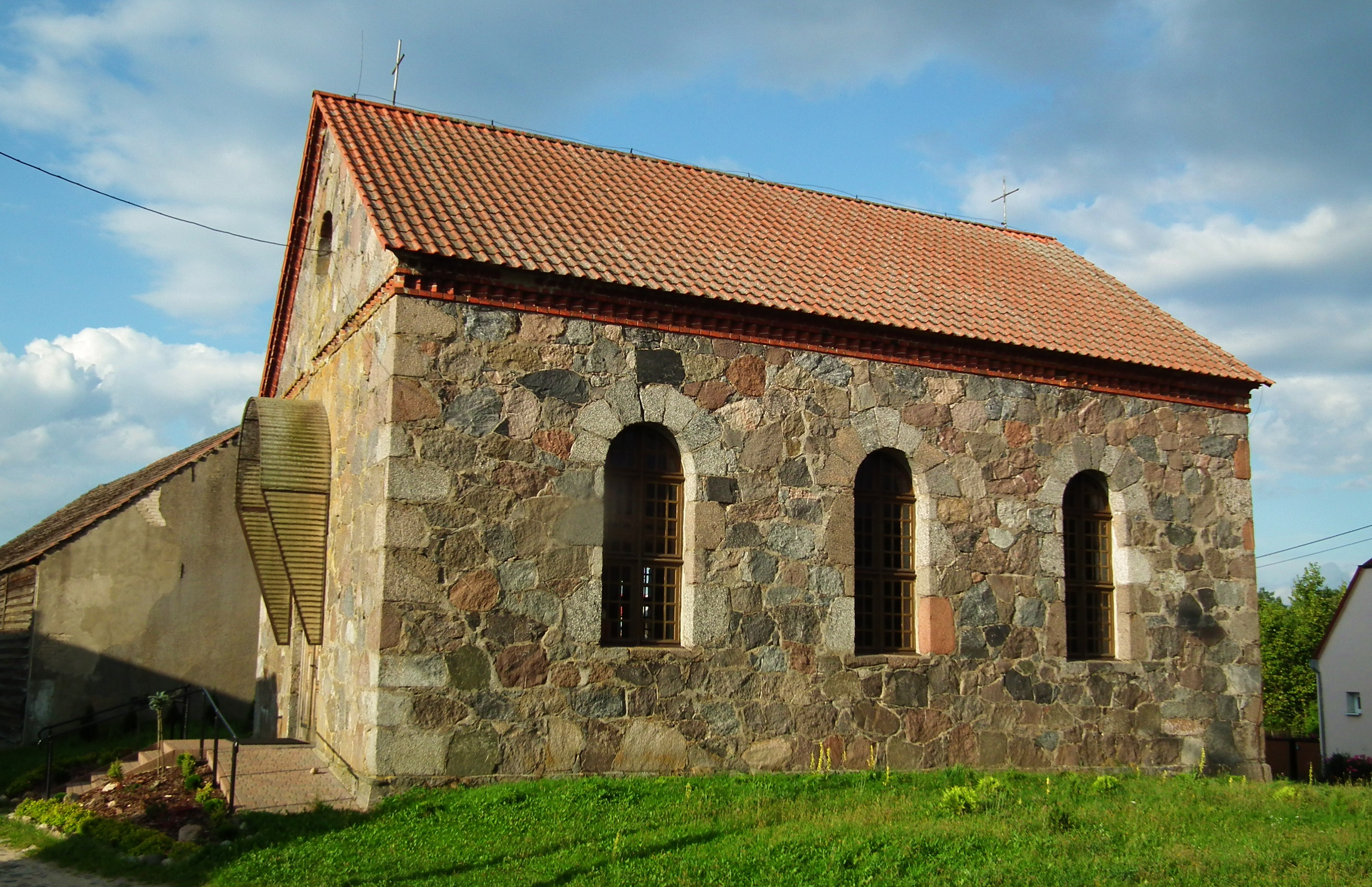
Sacred Heart church in Czarne Wielkie

A historic stone church of the Sacred Heart of Jesus is located in Czarne Wielkie.
