= Cichorzecze =

- Village
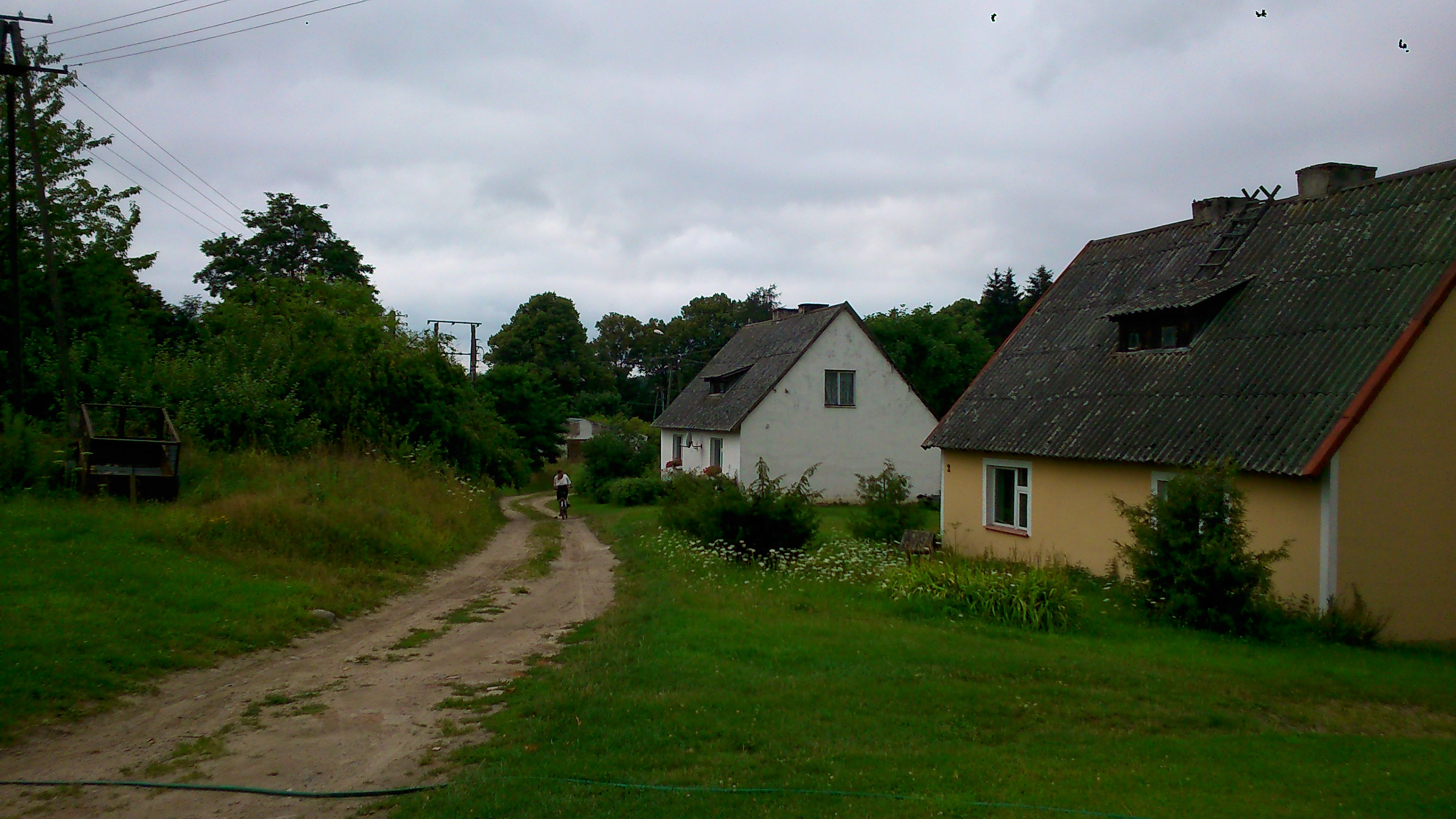

- Location within Poland
- Coordinates: 53°31′42″N 16°11′55″E
- Country: Poland
- Voivodeship: West Pomeranian
- County: Drawsko
- Gmina: Czaplinek
- Population: 10
- Time zone: UTC+1 (CET)
  - Summer (DST): UTC+2 (CEST)
- Area code: +48 94
- Car plates: ZDR

Cichorzecze [t͡ɕixɔˈʐɛt͡ʂɛ] (German: Klöbenstein) is a village in the administrative district of Gmina Czaplinek, within Drawsko County, West Pomeranian Voivodeship, in north-western Poland. It lies approximately 4 km (2 mi) south-west of Czaplinek, 27 km (17 mi) east of Drawsko Pomorskie, and 108 km (67 mi) east of the regional capital Szczecin.
