= Studniczka =

- Settlement
- Location within Poland
- Coordinates: 53°29′6″N 16°13′45″E
- Country: Poland
- Voivodeship: West Pomeranian
- County: Drawsko
- Gmina: Czaplinek
- Time zone: UTC+1 (CET)
  - Summer (DST): UTC+2 (CEST)
- Postal code: 78-550
- Area code: +48 94
- Vehicle registration: ZDR

Studniczka [studˈnit͡ʂka] (German: Klein Stüdnitz) is a settlement in the administrative district of Gmina Czaplinek, within Drawsko County, West Pomeranian Voivodeship, in north-western Poland. It lies approximately 8 km (5 mi) south of Czaplinek, 29 km (18 mi) east of Drawsko Pomorskie, and 110 km (68 mi) east of the regional capital Szczecin.
