= Niwka =

Niwka may refer to the following places:

- Niwka, Tarnów County in Lesser Poland Voivodeship (south Poland)
- Niwka, Drawsko County in West Pomeranian Voivodeship (north-west Poland)
- Niwka, Gryfino County in West Pomeranian Voivodeship (north-west Poland)
- Niwka, Kamień County in West Pomeranian Voivodeship (north-west Poland)
- Niwka, Sosnowiec, a district of Sosnowiec (south Poland)
