= Ostroróg (disambiguation) =

Ostroróg is a town in Poland.

Ostroróg may also refer to:

- Ostroróg, West Pomeranian Voivodeship, a village in north-west Poland
- Ostroróg, part of the district of Grunwald in Poznań, western Poland
- Ostroróg family:
  - Mikołaj Ostroróg (1593–1651), Polish nobleman
  - Stanisław Julian Ostroróg (1830–1890), portrait photographer
  - Leon Walerian Ostroróg (1867 - 1932), Polish jurist, writer, Islamic scholar, and adviser to the Ottoman government
