= Radomyśl, Drawsko County =

Radomyśl
- Village
- Location within Poland
- Coordinates: 53°27′50″N 16°1′31″E
- Country: Poland
- Voivodeship: West Pomeranian
- County: Drawsko
- Gmina: Wierzchowo

Population
  - Total: 130
- Time zone: UTC+1 (CET)
  - Summer (DST): UTC+2 (CEST)

Radomyśl [raˈdɔmɨɕl] (German: Friedrichshof) is a village in the administrative district of Gmina Wierzchowo, within Drawsko County, West Pomeranian Voivodeship, in north-western Poland. It lies approximately 6 km (4 mi) west of Wierzchowo, 17 km (11 mi) south-east of Drawsko Pomorskie, and 96 km (60 mi) east of the regional capital Szczecin.

The village has a population of 130.
