= Miłkowo =

Miłkowo may refer to the following places:

- Miłkowo, Greater Poland Voivodeship (west-central Poland)
- Miłkowo, Lubusz Voivodeship (west Poland)
- Miłkowo, Warmian-Masurian Voivodeship (north Poland)
- Miłkowo, Drawsko County in West Pomeranian Voivodeship (north-west Poland)
- Miłkowo, Szczecinek County in West Pomeranian Voivodeship (north-west Poland)

== See also ==
- Milkowo, West Pomeranian Voivodeship
