= Garbowo, West Pomeranian Voivodeship =

Garbowo
- Village
- Location within Poland
- Coordinates: 53°24′36″N 16°08′27″E
- Country: Poland
- Voivodeship: West Pomeranian
- County: Drawsko
- Gmina: Wierzchowo
- Population: 40
- Time zone: UTC+01:00 (CET)
  - Summer (DST): UTC+02:00 (CEST)

Garbowo [ɡarˈbɔvɔ] (German: Richtershof) is a village in the administrative district of Gmina Wierzchowo, within Drawsko County, West Pomeranian Voivodeship, in north-western Poland.

For the history of the region, see History of Pomerania.

The village has a population of 40.
