= Radomyśl =

Radomyśl may refer to the following places in Poland:

- Radomyśl, Greater Poland Voivodeship (west-central Poland)
- Radomyśl, Masovian Voivodeship (east-central Poland)
- Radomyśl, Drawsko County in West Pomeranian Voivodeship (north-west Poland)
- Radomyśl, Stargard County in West Pomeranian Voivodeship (north-west Poland)
- Radomyśl, Szczecinek County in West Pomeranian Voivodeship (north-west Poland)
- Radomyśl nad Sanem, Stalowa Wola County, Subcarpathian Voivodeship (south-eastern Poland)
- Radomyśl Wielki, Mielec County, Subcarpathian Voivodeship (south-eastern Poland)

Radomyšl may also refer to the following places:

- Radomyšl, a village in Strakonice District in southern Bohemia
- Radomyśl, Polish name of Radomyshl, a town in Ukraine
