= Kamienna Góra, West Pomeranian Voivodeship =

Kamienna Góra
- Village
- Location within Poland
- Coordinates: 53°29′26″N 16°19′8″E
- Country: Poland
- Voivodeship: West Pomeranian
- County: Drawsko
- Gmina: Czaplinek
- Population: 40
- Time zone: UTC+1 (CET)
  - Summer (DST): UTC+2 (CEST)
- Area code: +48 94
- Car plates: ZDR

Kamienna Góra [kaˈmjɛnna ˈɡura] (German: Steinberg) is a village in the administrative district of Gmina Czaplinek, within Drawsko County, West Pomeranian Voivodeship, in north-western Poland. It lies approximately 9 km (6 mi) south-east of Czaplinek, 35 km (22 mi) east of Drawsko Pomorskie, and 116 km (72 mi) east of the regional capital Szczecin.

The village has a population of 40.
