= Chmielewo, West Pomeranian Voivodeship =

Chmielewo
- Settlement
- Location within Poland
- Coordinates: 53°33′N 16°10′E
- Country: Poland
- Voivodeship: West Pomeranian
- County: Drawsko
- Gmina: Czaplinek
- Time zone: UTC+1 (CET)
  - Summer (DST): UTC+2 (CEST)
- Area code: +48 94
- Car plates: ZDR

Chmielewo [xmjɛˈlɛvɔ] (German: Augustenweide) is a settlement in the administrative district of Gmina Czaplinek, within Drawsko County, West Pomeranian Voivodeship, in north-western Poland. It lies approximately 5 km (3 mi) west of Czaplinek, 25 km (16 mi) east of Drawsko Pomorskie, and 106 km (66 mi) east of the regional capital Szczecin.
