= Bielice, Drawsko County =

Bielice
- Settlement
- Location within Poland
- Coordinates: 53°40′04″N 16°13′18″E
- Country: Poland
- Voivodeship: West Pomeranian
- County: Drawsko
- Gmina: Czaplinek
- Time zone: UTC+1 (CET)
  - Summer (DST): UTC+2 (CEST)
- Area code: +48 94
- Car plates: ZDR

Bielice [bjɛˈlit͡sɛ] (German: Neuhagen) is a settlement in the administrative district of Gmina Czaplinek, within Drawsko County, West Pomeranian Voivodeship, in north-western Poland.

Between 1871 and 1945 the area was part of Germany.
