= Motarzewo =

- Village
- Location within Poland
- Coordinates: 53°29′49″N 16°22′18″E
- Country: Poland
- Voivodeship: West Pomeranian
- County: Drawsko
- Gmina: Czaplinek

Population
  - Total: 80
- Time zone: UTC+1 (CET)
  - Summer (DST): UTC+2 (CEST)
- Postal code: 78-553
- Area code: +48 94
- Car plates: ZDR

Motarzewo [mɔtaˈʐɛvɔ] (German: Wallbruch) is a village in the administrative district of Gmina Czaplinek, within Drawsko County, West Pomeranian Voivodeship, in north-western Poland. It lies approximately 11 km (7 mi) south-east of Czaplinek, 39 km (24 mi) east of Drawsko Pomorskie, and 119 km (74 mi) east of the regional capital Szczecin.
