= Głęboczek, West Pomeranian Voivodeship =

Głęboczek
- Village
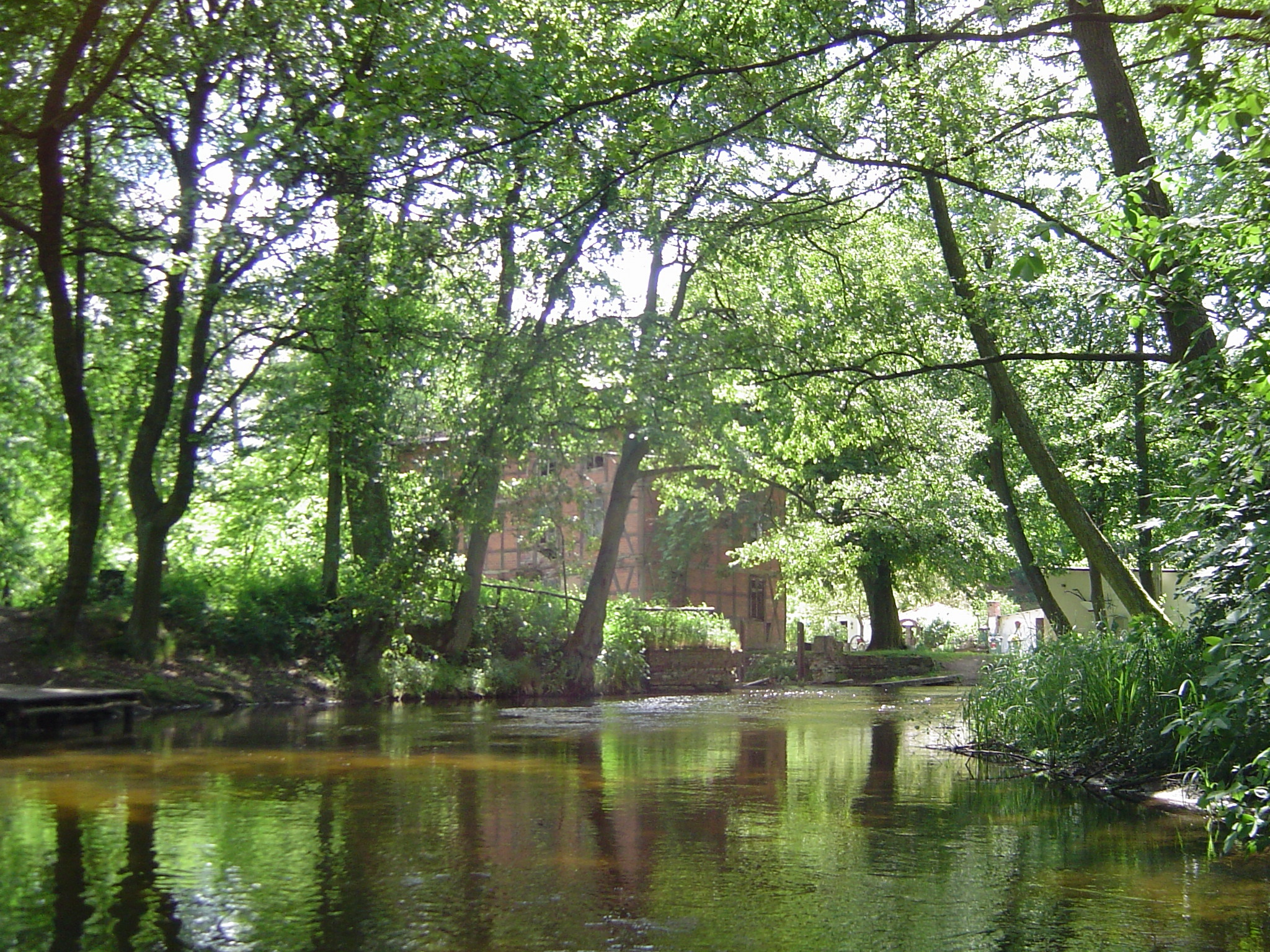
- Watermill in Głęboczek

- Location within Poland
- Coordinates: 53°34′N 16°5′E
- Country: Poland
- Voivodeship: West Pomeranian
- County: Drawsko
- Gmina: Czaplinek
- Time zone: UTC+1 (CET)
  - Summer (DST): UTC+2 (CEST)
- Area code: +48 94
- Car plates: ZDR

Głęboczek [ɡwɛmˈbɔt͡ʂɛk] (German: Winkel) is a village in the administrative district of Gmina Czaplinek, within Drawsko County, West Pomeranian Voivodeship, in north-western Poland. It lies approximately 11 km (7 mi) west of Czaplinek, 20 km (12 mi) east of Drawsko Pomorskie, and 101 km (63 mi) east of the regional capital Szczecin.

A historic timber-framed watermill is located in Głęboczek.
