= Gmina Wierzchowo =

Gmina Wierzchowo Wierzchowo Commune
- Gmina
- Coat of arms

- Location within Poland
- Coordinates (Wierzchowo): 53°27′36″N 16°6′4″E
- Country: Poland
- Voivodeship: West Pomeranian
- County: Drawsko
- Seat: Wierzchowo

Area
  - Total: 229.25 km^{2} (88.51 sq mi)

Population (2006)
  - Total: 4,489
  - Density: 19.58/km^{2} (50.72/sq mi)
- Website: http://www.wierzchowo.pl/

Gmina Wierzchowo is a rural gmina (administrative district) in Drawsko County, West Pomeranian Voivodeship, in north-western Poland. Its seat is the village of Wierzchowo, which lies approximately 22 kilometres (14 mi) east of Drawsko Pomorskie and 101 km (63 mi) east of the regional capital Szczecin.

The gmina covers an area of 229.25 square kilometres (88.5 sq mi), and as of 2006 its total population is 4,489.

== Villages ==
Gmina Wierzchowo contains the villages and settlements of Będlino, Bonin, Danowice, Dębniewice, Garbowo, Knowie, Króle, Nowe Laski, Osiek Drawski, Otrzep, Radomyśl, Sośnica, Świerczyna, Wielboki, Wierzchówko, Wierzchowo, Żabin, Żabinek and Żeńsko.

== Neighbouring gminas ==
Gmina Wierzchowo is bordered by the gminas of Czaplinek, Kalisz Pomorski, Mirosławiec, Wałcz and Złocieniec.

== Sources ==
- Polish official population figures 2006
