= Ostroróg, West Pomeranian Voivodeship =

Ostroróg
- Village
- Location within Poland
- Coordinates: 53°33′N 16°24′E
- Country: Poland
- Voivodeship: West Pomeranian
- County: Drawsko
- Gmina: Czaplinek
- Time zone: UTC+1 (CET)
  - Summer (DST): UTC+2 (CEST)
- Area code: +48 94
- Car plates: ZDR

Ostroróg [ɔsˈtrɔruk] (German: Scharpenort) is a village in the administrative district of Gmina Czaplinek, within Drawsko County, West Pomeranian Voivodeship, in north-western Poland. It lies approximately 12 km (7 mi) east of Czaplinek, 40 km (25 mi) east of Drawsko Pomorskie, and 122 km (76 mi) east of the regional capital Szczecin.

It was a royal village of the Polish Crown.
