= Gmina Czaplinek =

Gmina Czaplinek Czaplinek Commune
- Gmina
- Flag Coat of arms
- Interactive map of Gmina Czaplinek
- Coordinates (Czaplinek): 53°33′N 16°14′E
- Country: Poland
- Voivodeship: West Pomeranian
- County: Drawsko
- Seat: Czaplinek

Area
  - Total: 364.72 km^{2} (140.82 sq mi)

Population (2006)
  - Total: 11,795
  - Density: 32.340/km^{2} (83.760/sq mi)
  - Urban: 6,933
  - Rural: 4,862
- Website: http://www.czaplinek.pl/

Gmina Czaplinek is an urban-rural gmina (administrative district) in Drawsko County, West Pomeranian Voivodeship, in north-western Poland. Its seat is the town of Czaplinek, which lies approximately 29 kilometres (18 mi) east of Drawsko Pomorskie and 111 km (69 mi) east of the regional capital Szczecin.

The gmina covers an area of 364.72 square kilometres (140.8 sq mi), and as of 2006 its total population is 11,795 (out of which the population of Czaplinek amounts to 6,933, and the population of the rural part of the gmina is 4,862).

The gmina contains part of the protected area called Drawsko Landscape Park.

== Villages ==
Apart from the town of Czaplinek, Gmina Czaplinek contains the villages and settlements of Bielice, Broczyno, Brzezinka, Buszcze, Byszkowo, Chmielewo, Cichorzecze, Czarne Małe, Czarne Wielkie, Dobrzyca Mała, Drahimek, Głęboczek, Kamienna Góra, Karsno, Kluczewo, Kluczewo-Kolonia, Kołomąt, Kosin, Kuszewo, Kuźnica Drawska, Łąka, Łazice, Łysinin, Machliny, Miłkowo, Motarzewo, Niwka, Nowa Wieś, Nowe Drawsko, Ostroróg, Piaseczno, Piekary, Podstrzesze, Prosinko, Prosino, Psie Głowy, Rzepowo, Sikory, Stare Drawsko, Stare Gonne, Stare Kaleńsko, Studniczka, Sulibórz, Trzciniec, Turze, Wełnica, Wrześnica, Zdziersko, Żelisławie and Żerdno.

== Neighbouring gminas ==
Gmina Czaplinek is bordered by the gminas of Barwice, Borne Sulinowo, Jastrowie, Ostrowice, Połczyn-Zdrój, Wałcz, Wierzchowo and Złocieniec.
