= Miłkowo, Drawsko County =

Miłkowo
- Village
- Location within Poland
- Coordinates: 53°30′39″N 16°20′24″E
- Country: Poland
- Voivodeship: West Pomeranian
- County: Drawsko
- Gmina: Czaplinek

Population
  - Total: 200
- Time zone: UTC+1 (CET)
  - Summer (DST): UTC+2 (CEST)
- Postal code: 78-553
- Area code: +48 94
- Car plates: ZDR

Miłkowo [miu̯ˈkɔvɔ] (German: Milkow) is a village in the administrative district of Gmina Czaplinek, within Drawsko County, West Pomeranian Voivodeship, in north-western Poland. It lies approximately 9 km (6 mi) south-east of Czaplinek, 36 km (22 mi) east of Drawsko Pomorskie, and 117 km (73 mi) east of the regional capital Szczecin.
