= Stare Drawsko =

- Village
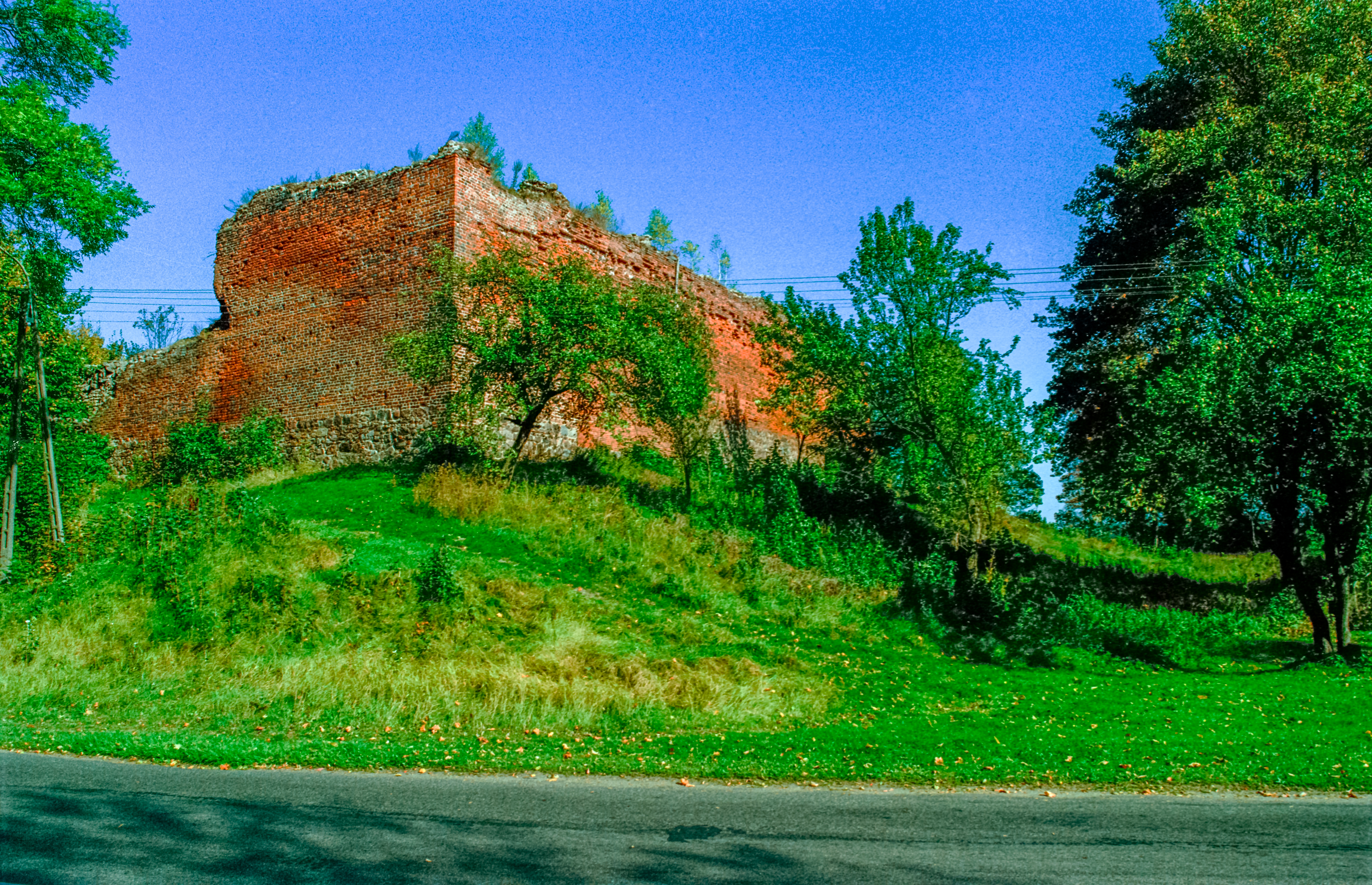
- Ruins of Drahim Castle

- Location within Poland
- Coordinates: 53°36′7″N 16°11′44″E
- Country: Poland
- Voivodeship: West Pomeranian
- County: Drawsko
- Gmina: Czaplinek

Population
  - Total: 140
- Time zone: UTC+1 (CET)
  - Summer (DST): UTC+2 (CEST)
- Area code: +48 94
- Car plates: ZDR

Stare Drawsko [ˈstarɛ ˈdrafskɔ] (until 1945 Polish: Drahim; German: Alt Draheim) is a village in the administrative district of Gmina Czaplinek, within Drawsko County, West Pomeranian Voivodeship, in north-western Poland. The village is prominent as the seat of the historic Starostwo of Draheim.

== Geography ==
The village forms a northwestern outpost of the historic Greater Poland region, where it borders with Pomerania. It lies approximately 7 km (4 mi) north-west of Czaplinek, 28 km (17 mi) east of Drawsko Pomorskie, and 109 km (68 mi) east of the regional capital Szczecin. The village has a population of 140.

== History ==
The 14th century Drahim Castle was a stronghold of the Knights Hospitaller, who controlled the Polish-Pomeranian border region. In 1407 German and Polish robber barons conquered the castle and expelled the knights. The robber barons made the castle the starting point of their brigandage, until the burghers of Drawsko defeated them in 1422. In 1438 the Teutonic Knights arranged it so that Poland could take control of the region, which it reorganised as the Starostwo Drahimskie, with Drahim as its capital, within the Poznań Voivodeship and Greater Poland Province.

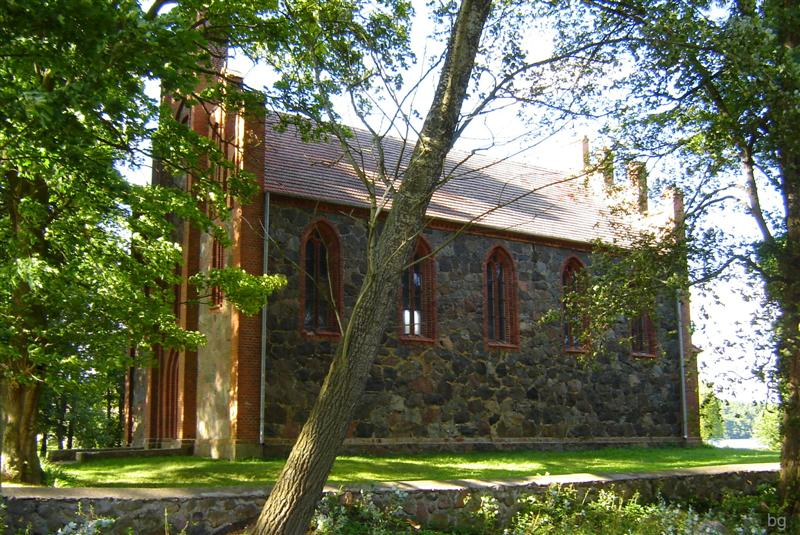
Parish church

In 1657 King John II Casimir of Poland pawned this Poznanian starostwo, including Drahim, to the "Great Elector" Frederick William of Brandenburg in return for a credit by the Treaty of Bromberg. In 1668 Frederick William acquired the starostwo as his personal estate and invested a bailiff with its administration. In the course of the First Partition of Poland in 1773, Draheim was incorporated into the Brandenburgian Neumark region within the Kingdom of Prussia. Following a Prussian administrative reform it became part of the Köslin region in the Province of Pomerania in 1817. After the defeat of Nazi Germany in 1945, it was reincorporated to Poland.
