= Wierzchowo, Drawsko County =

Wierzchowo
- Village
- Location within Poland
- Coordinates: 53°27′36″N 16°6′4″E
- Country: Poland
- Voivodeship: West Pomeranian
- County: Drawsko
- Gmina: Wierzchowo
- Population: 1,500
- Website: http://www.wierzchowo.pl

Wierzchowo [vjɛʂˈxɔvɔ] (formerly German Virchow) is a village in Drawsko County, West Pomeranian Voivodeship, in north-western Poland. It is the seat of the gmina (administrative district) called Gmina Wierzchowo. It lies approximately 22 km (14 mi) east of Drawsko Pomorskie and 101 km (63 mi) east of the regional capital Szczecin.

Before 1945 the area was part of Prussia. For the history of the region, see History of Pomerania.

The village has a population of 1,500.
