= Drawsko County =

Drawsko County Powiat drawski
- County
- Flag Coat of arms

- Location within the voivodeship

- Division into gminas
- Coordinates (Drawsko Pomorskie): 53°32′N 15°48′E
- Country: Poland
- Voivodeship: West Pomeranian
- Seat: Drawsko Pomorskie
- Gminas: Total 6: Gmina Czaplinek; Gmina Drawsko Pomorskie; Gmina Kalisz Pomorski; Gmina Ostrowice; Gmina Wierzchowo; Gmina Złocieniec

Area
  - Total: 1,764.21 km^{2} (681.17 sq mi)

Population (2015)
  - Total: 58,062
  - Density: 32.911/km^{2} (85.239/sq mi)
  - Urban: 35,764
  - Rural: 22,309
- Car plates: ZDR
- Website: www.powiatdrawski.pl

Drawsko County (Polish: powiat drawski) is a unit of territorial administration and local government (powiat) in West Pomeranian Voivodeship, north-western Poland. It came into being on January 1, 1999, as a result of the Polish local government reforms passed in 1998. Its administrative seat is the town of Drawsko Pomorskie, which lies 82 kilometres (51 mi) east of the regional capital Szczecin. The county contains three other towns: Złocieniec, 15 km (9 mi) east of Drawsko Pomorskie, Czaplinek, 29 km (18 mi) east of Drawsko Pomorskie, and Kalisz Pomorski, 29 km (18 mi) south of Drawsko Pomorskie.

The county covers an area of 1,764.21 square kilometres (681.2 sq mi). As of 2015 its total population is 58,062, out of which the population of Złocieniec is 13,377, that of Drawsko Pomorskie is 11,465, that of Czaplinek is 6,933, that of Kalisz Pomorski is 3,989, and the rural population is 22,309.

The eastern part of the county contains part of the protected area known as Drawsko Landscape Park.

== Neighbouring counties ==
Drawsko County is bordered by Świdwin County to the north, Szczecinek County and Złotów County to the east, Wałcz County to the south-east, Choszczno County to the south, Stargard County to the west, and Łobez County to the north-west.

== Administrative divisions ==
The county is subdivided into six gminas (four urban-rural and two rural). These are listed in the following table, in descending order of population.

Gmina	Type	Area (km^{2})	Population (2006)	Seat
Gmina Drawsko Pomorskie	urban-rural	344.8	16,537	Drawsko Pomorskie
Gmina Złocieniec	urban-rural	194.5	15,571	Złocieniec
Gmina Czaplinek	urban-rural	364.7	11,795	Czaplinek
Gmina Kalisz Pomorski	urban-rural	480.5	7,150	Kalisz Pomorski
Gmina Wierzchowo	rural	229.3	4,489	Wierzchowo
Gmina Ostrowice	rural	150.4	2,531	Ostrowice
