= Kokna (river) =

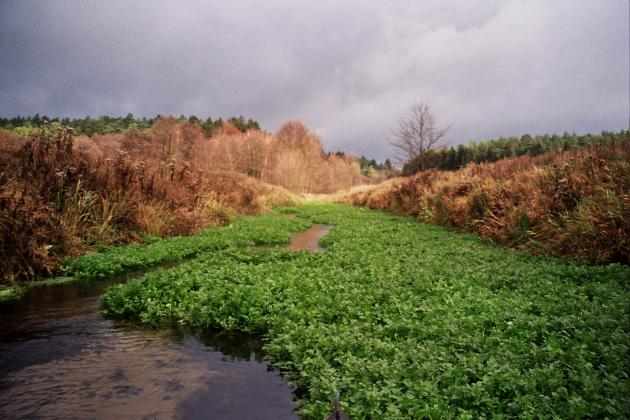

Location
- Country: Poland
- Voivodeships of Poland: West Pomeranian
- County (Powiat): Drawsko

Physical characteristics
- Source: Lake Ostrowiec
  - location: east of Borne, Gmina Ostrowice
  - coordinates: 53°37′35″N 15°56′56″E
- Mouth: Drawa
  - location: northwest of Rzęśnica, Gmina Złocieniec
  - coordinates: 53.5488°N 15.9215°E
- Length: 23.9 km (14.9 mi)

Basin features
- Progression: Drawa→ Noteć→ Warta→ Oder→ Baltic Sea

Kokna is a river of Poland, a tributary of the Drawa near Złocieniec.
