= Drawa =

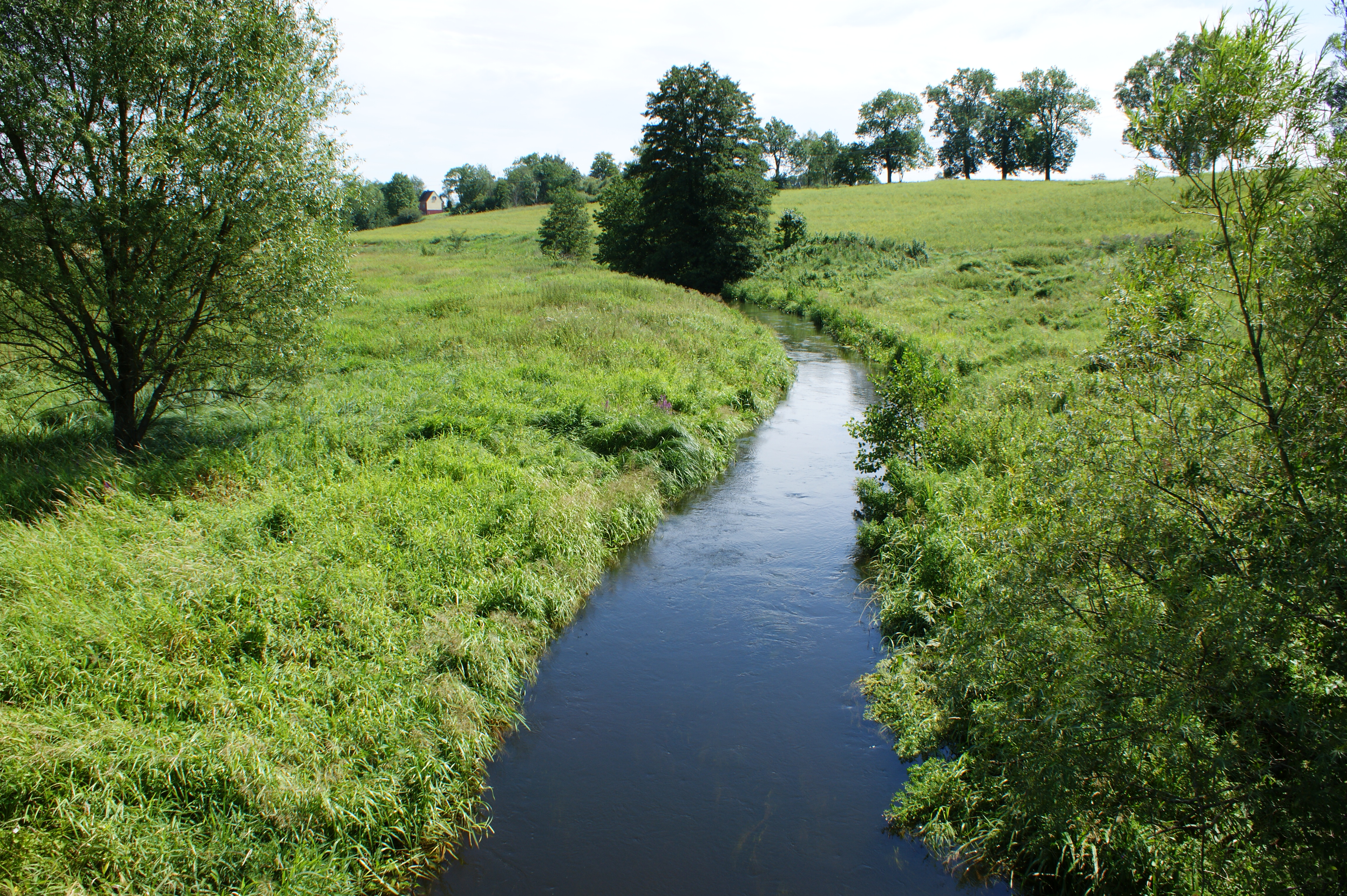
- The Drawa, close to Rzęśnica, Drawsko County

Physical characteristics
- Mouth
  - location: Noteć
  - coordinates: 52°51′28″N 15°59′25″E
- Length: 192 km (119 mi)
- Basin size: 3,291 km^{2} (1,271 sq mi)
- Discharge
  - average: 21.3 m^{3}/s (750 cu ft/s)

Basin features
- Progression: Noteć→ Warta→ Oder→ Baltic Sea

The Drawa (German: Drage) is a river and popular aquatic trail in Poland, 192 km long. The surface of its catchment area amounts to 3291 km^{2}. The Drawa begins its course at Lake Krzywe in Drawsko Landscape Park and ends it in Noteć below Krzyż Wielkopolski. The Drawa is a right-bank tributary of Noteć, the second regarding size. Its average gradient is 0,61% and its flow rate 19 m^{3}/s. It is the longest river in Pojezierze Drawskie.

== Geography ==
The Drawa flows across regions including Pojezierze Drawskie, Równina Drawska and partly near Pojezierze Wałeckie and Kotlina Gorzowska. The source of the Drawa is in nature reserve Dolina Pięciu Jezior. Then, the river flows across Drawski Landscape Park, Drawieński National Park and Drawski forest.

The section from Czaplinek to Noteć is called the Karol Wojtyła Silver Route.

== Tributaries ==
The biggest tributaries of the Drawa are the Kokna, Korytnica, Mierzęcka Struga, Płociczna, Pokrętna, Słopica, Wąsowa. The main streams of the river are the Bagnica, Drawsko, Drawka, Głęboka, Miedzniki, Moczel, Pełknica, Radówka, Sitna, Studzienica, Sucha, Szczuczna, Wilżnica.

One canal, Prostynia, flows into the Drawa.

== Lakes ==
The Drawa flows through many lakes. In the upper region of the river there are Górne, Krąg, Długie, Głębokie, Małe. Further down the river, the lakes Prosino, Żerdno, Drawsko Lake, Rzepowskie, Lubie, Krosino, Wielkie and Małe Dębno can be found.

== Towns ==
- Czaplinek
- Złocieniec
- Drawsko Pomorskie
- Prostynia
- Drawno
- Stare Osieczno
- Przedborowo
- Krzyż Wielkopolski

== Flora and fauna ==
The river contains over thirty species of fish, including the Rutilus, perch, gudgeon, European chub, burbot, trout, grayling, barbel, bream, spirlin and silver bream. The river is also a place of living of the rare specimens – sea trout, common minnow, european bullhead and vimba vimba.

The Drawa also hosts buzzards, red algae, sponges, spargania and potamogeton.

== History ==
From the 14th century, the river has been used as a navigational route. Since 1700, the Drawa has been used for drifting honey from Drawsko to Frankfurt. Navigation of the river continued until World War II.

In 1974, on the river route was founded a nature reserve Drawa and in 1990 Drawieński National Park.

== Attractions ==
The Drawa flows near various historical buildings. One of them is Drahimski Castle, which was turned into the museum. The castle was built in 1360 by the Order of Saint John. There are also interesting bunkers near camping in Kotlina. On Drawa's route Wedel's Castle, from the 14th century, can also be found. On one of the banks, Wydrzy Głaz can be found (Moczele). On the section of the river from Lubie to Prostynia, rafting and canoeing are forbidden because the Drawski Training Ground is located in that area.

== See also ==
- Rivers of Poland
