= Szymalów =

- Settlement
- Location within Poland
- Coordinates: 53°35′56″N 16°7′49″E
- Country: Poland
- Voivodeship: West Pomeranian
- County: Drawsko
- Gmina: Złocieniec

Szymalów (Polish pronunciation: [ʂɨˈmaluf]) is a settlement in the administrative district of Gmina Złocieniec, within Drawsko County, West Pomeranian Voivodeship, in north-western Poland. It lies approximately 12 km (7 mi) north-east of Złocieniec, 24 km (15 mi) east of Drawsko Pomorskie, and 105 km (65 mi) east of the regional capital Szczecin.

Before 1772 the area was part of Kingdom of Poland, 1772-1945 Prussia and Germany. For more on its history, see Wałcz County and "Warlang-Heinrichsdorf Domain".
