= Rzęśnica =

Rzęśnica may refer to:

- Rzęśnica, Drawsko County, West Pomeranian Voivodeship, Poland
- Rzęśnica, Goleniów County, a municipality in the Province of Pomerania, Poland
