= Skąpe, West Pomeranian Voivodeship =

Skąpe
- Settlement
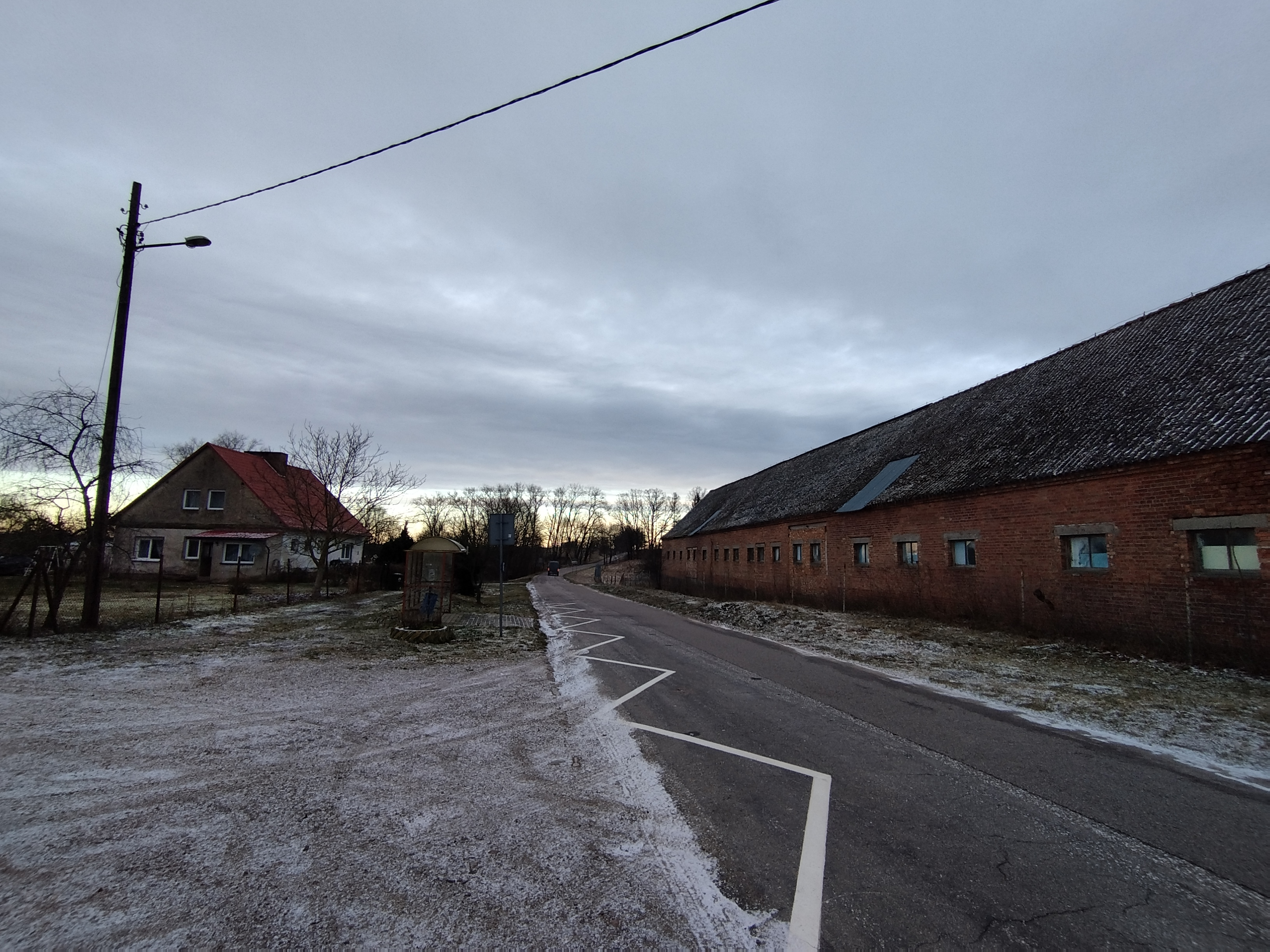

- Location within Poland
- Coordinates: 53°36′24″N 16°3′53″E
- Country: Poland
- Voivodeship: West Pomeranian
- County: Drawsko
- Gmina: Złocieniec

Population
  - Total: 2,007
- Postal code: 78-520

Skąpe [ˈskɔmpɛ] is a settlement in the administrative district of Gmina Złocieniec, within Drawsko County, West Pomeranian Voivodeship, in north-western Poland. It lies approximately 10 km (6 mi) north of Złocieniec, 20 km (12 mi) north-east of Drawsko Pomorskie, and 101 km (63 mi) east of the regional capital Szczecin.

The settlement has a population of 2,007.

== See also ==
- History of Pomerania
