= Sułoszyn, West Pomeranian Voivodeship =

Sułoszyn
- Settlement
- Location within Poland
- Coordinates: 53°30′41″N 16°3′0″E
- Country: Poland
- Voivodeship: West Pomeranian
- County: Drawsko
- Gmina: Złocieniec
- Population: 2,007

Sułoszyn [suˈwɔʂɨn] is a settlement in the administrative district of Gmina Złocieniec, within Drawsko County, West Pomeranian Voivodeship, in north-western Poland. It lies approximately 4 km (2 mi) south-east of Złocieniec, 17 km (11 mi) east of Drawsko Pomorskie, and 98 km (61 mi) east of the regional capital Szczecin.

For the history of the region, see History of Pomerania.

The settlement has a population of 2,007.
