= Wąsosz, West Pomeranian Voivodeship =

Wąsosz
- Village
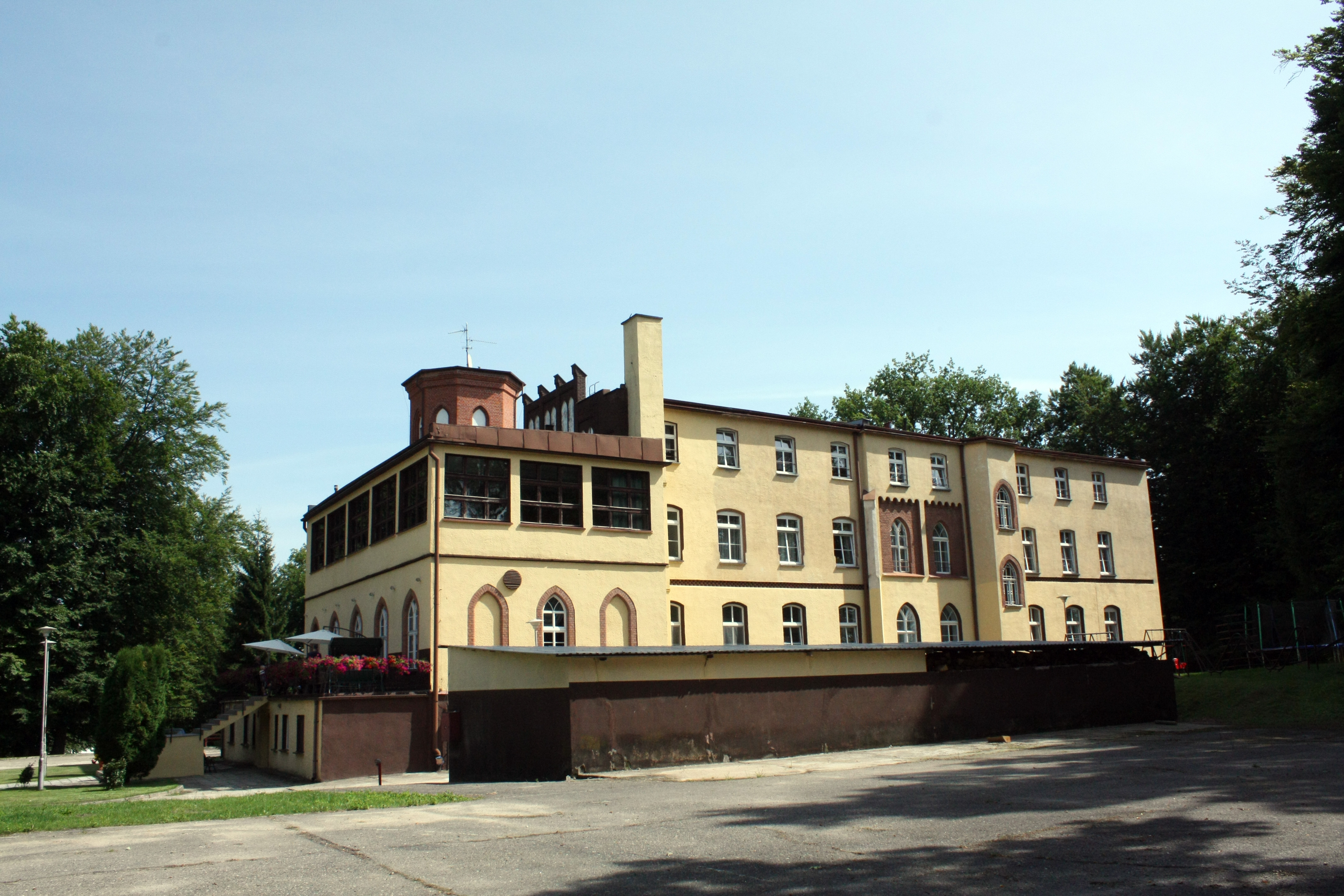

- Location within Poland
- Coordinates: 53°30′4″N 16°5′30″E
- Country: Poland
- Voivodeship: West Pomeranian
- County: Drawsko
- Gmina: Złocieniec

Population
  - Total: 10
- Time zone: UTC+1 (CET)
  - Summer (DST): UTC+2 (CEST)
- Postal code: 78-520

Wąsosz [ˈvɔ̃sɔʂ] (German: Bruchhof) is a village in the administrative district of Gmina Złocieniec, within Drawsko County, West Pomeranian Voivodeship, in north-western Poland. It lies approximately 6 km (4 mi) south-east of Złocieniec, 20 km (12 mi) east of Drawsko Pomorskie, and 101 km (63 mi) east of the regional capital Szczecin.

The village has a population of 10.
