= Otto Fischbeck =

German politician (1865–1939)

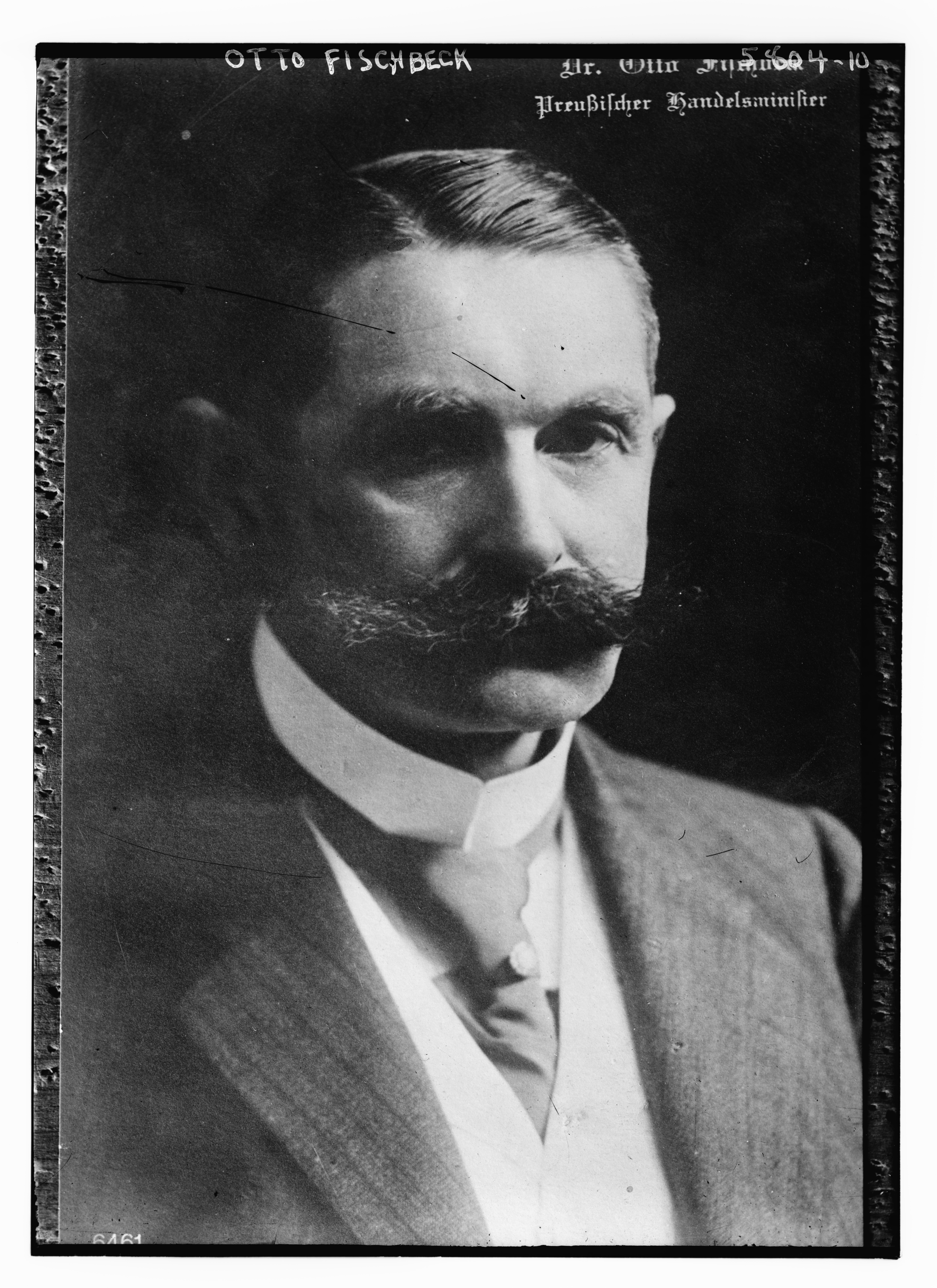
- Otto Fischbeck about 1920

Member of the Reichstag (Weimar Republic)
- In office 7 January 1925 – 18 July 1930
- Constituency: National list

(German Empire)
- In office 3 December 1903 – 9 November 1918
- Constituency: Liegnitz 6

Member of the German National Assembly
- In office 6 February 1919 – 21 May 1920
- Constituency: Liegnitz 11

Prussian Minister of Trade and Commerce
- In office 5 October 1918 – 1 November 1921
- Monarch: Wilhelm II (until 1918)
- Minister-President: Max von Baden; Paul Hirsch; Otto Braun; Adam Stegerwald

Member of the Prussian House of Representatives
- In office 1921–1924
- Constituency: Liegnitz-Goldberg-Haynau (Legnica-Złotoryja-Chojnów)
- In office 1903–1913

Personal details
- Born: 28 August 1865 Güntershagen, Province of Pomerania, Kingdom of Prussia (Lubieszewo, Poland)
- Died: 23 May 1939 (aged 73) Berlin, Nazi Germany
- Party: German Democratic Party
- Other political affiliations: Progressive People's Party (1910–1918)

Otto Fischbeck (28 August 1865 – 23 May 1939) was a German liberal politician, member of the Prussian and German parliament and Prussian Minister of trade and commerce from 1918 to 1921.

== Early life ==
Fischbeck was born in Güntershagen, Province of Pomerania, Kingdom of Prussia (Lubieszewo, Poland), he studied economics and administrative sciences at the Universities of Berlin and Greifswald.

== Career ==
From 1890 to 1895 he worked as a counsel at the chamber of commerce in Bielefeld and from 1895 to 1901 at the Employers Liability Insurance Association for paper processing industries in Berlin. From 1893 to 1895 he served as a town councillor in Bielefeld, and in 1900 Fischbeck became town councillor in Berlin. On 1 April 1918 he became the chairman of the municipal association of Greater Berlin.

From 1895 to 1903 and from 1907 to 1918 Fischbeck was a member of the German parliament and from 1903 to 1913 Member of the Prussian House of Representatives (Landtag). On 5 October 1918 he became the Prussian Minister for Trade and Commerce, a position he held until 1 November 1921.

Following World War I Fischbeck was a founding member of the Deutsche Demokratische Partei and was elected a member of the Weimar National Assembly (1919/20), he was again a member of the Prussian Landtag from 1921 to 1924 and was re-elected to the Reichstag in 1924 and 1928. He left the Reichstag in 1930.

== Personal life ==
Fischbeck died in Berlin in 1939.
