= Cieszyno, Drawsko County =

Cieszyno
- Village
- Location within Poland
- Coordinates: 53°35′25″N 16°2′40″E
- Country: Poland
- Voivodeship: West Pomeranian
- County: Drawsko
- Gmina: Złocieniec
- Time zone: UTC+1 (CET)
  - Summer (DST): UTC+2 (CEST)

Cieszyno [t͡ɕɛˈʂɨnɔ] (German: Teschendorf) is a village in the administrative district of Gmina Złocieniec, within Drawsko County, West Pomeranian Voivodeship, in north-western Poland. It lies approximately 8 km (5 mi) north of Złocieniec, 18 km (11 mi) east of Drawsko Pomorskie, and 99 km (62 mi) east of the regional capital Szczecin.

During World War II the Germans established and operated a forced labour camp for prisoners of war of various nationalities in the village.
