= Kosobudy =

Kosobudy may refer to the following places:

- Kosobudy, Lublin Voivodeship (east Poland)
- Kosobudy, Pomeranian Voivodeship (north Poland)
- Kosobudy, Drawsko County in West Pomeranian Voivodeship (north-west Poland)
- Kosobudy, Szczecinek County in West Pomeranian Voivodeship (north-west Poland)
