= Stare Worowo =

- Village
- Location within Poland
- Coordinates: 53°38′N 16°4′E
- Country: Poland
- Voivodeship: West Pomeranian
- County: Drawsko
- Gmina: Złocieniec

Stare Worowo [ˈstarɛ vɔˈrɔvɔ] (formerly German Alt Wuhrow) is a village in the administrative district of Gmina Złocieniec, within Drawsko County, West Pomeranian Voivodeship, in north-western Poland. It lies approximately 13 km (8 mi) north of Złocieniec, 21 km (13 mi) north-east of Drawsko Pomorskie, and 102 km (63 mi) east of the regional capital Szczecin.

== History ==
The village was founded before 1300. The village was plundered by Polish-Lithuanian troops in 1326. In 1499, the village belonged to the noble family Borcke. In 1657, Polish troops steal corn. The timber-framed church dates from 1689, as written on the weather vane. At this time, the village was property of te von Goltz. Protestants belonged to the parish of Teschendorf, Catholics to Schivelbein For more on the history of the region, see History of Pomerania.
