= Uraz =

Uraz may refer to:

== People ==
- Onursal Uraz (1944–2021), Turkish footballer
- Yağmur Uraz, Turkish female football player

== Places ==
- Uraz, Lower Silesian Voivodeship, south-west Poland
- Uraz, West Pomeranian Voivodeship, north-west Poland
