= Zatonie, West Pomeranian Voivodeship =

Zatonie
- Village
- Location within Poland
- Coordinates: 53°25′56″N 15°58′35″E
- Country: Poland
- Voivodeship: West Pomeranian
- County: Drawsko
- Gmina: Złocieniec
- Population: 10

Zatonie [zaˈtɔɲɛ] (formerly German Grünhof) is a village in the administrative district of Gmina Złocieniec, within Drawsko County, West Pomeranian Voivodeship, in north-western Poland. It lies approximately 11 km (7 mi) south of Złocieniec, 17 km (11 mi) south-east of Drawsko Pomorskie, and 93 km (58 mi) east of the regional capital Szczecin.

For the history of the region, see History of Pomerania.

The village has a population of 10.
