= Wąsowa =

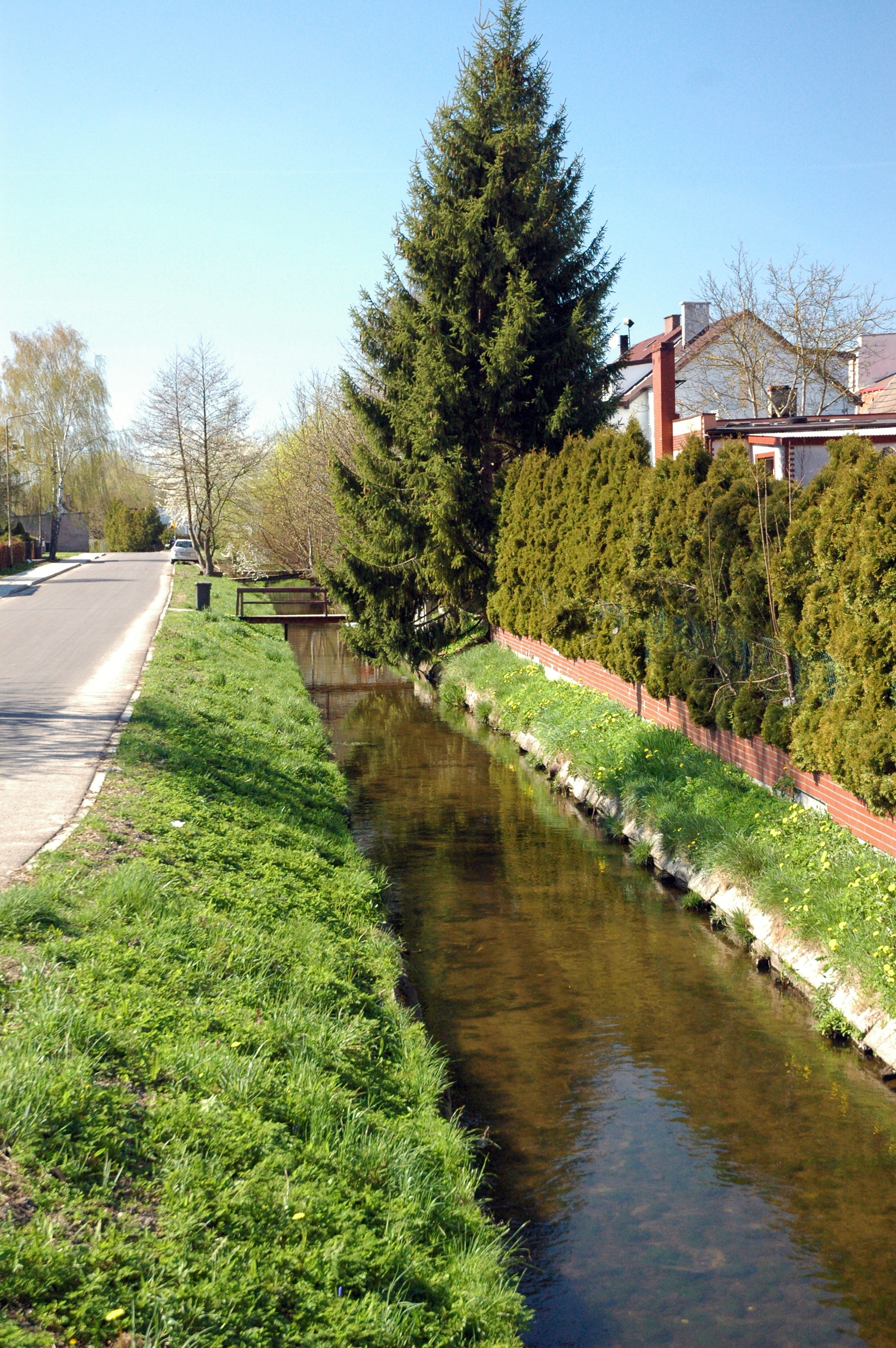

Location
- Country: Poland

Physical characteristics
- Source
  - location: Wąsosze
- Mouth
  - location: Drawa
  - coordinates: 53°32′07″N 16°00′12″E

Basin features
- Progression: Drawa→ Noteć→ Warta→ Oder→ Baltic Sea

Wąsowa is a river of Poland. It flows out of the lake Wąsosze and is a left tributary of the River Drawa in Złocieniec. The name Wąsowa was officially changed, replacing the former German name of "Vansow-Fluss" in 1949.
