= Błędno, West Pomeranian Voivodeship =

Błędno
- Settlement
- Location within Poland
- Coordinates: 53°27′38″N 15°55′0″E
- Country: Poland
- Voivodeship: West Pomeranian
- County: Drawsko
- Gmina: Złocieniec
- Population: 2,007

Błędno [ˈbwɛndnɔ] (German: Johannesthal)) is a settlement in the administrative district of Gmina Złocieniec, within Drawsko County, West Pomeranian Voivodeship, in north-western Poland. It lies approximately 10 km (6 mi) south-west of Złocieniec, 12 km (7 mi) south-east of Drawsko Pomorskie, and 89 km (55 mi) east of the regional capital Szczecin.

The settlement has a population of 2,007.

== See also ==
- History of Pomerania
