= Jadwiżyn =

Jadwiżyn may refer to the following places:

- Jadwiżyn, Kuyavian-Pomeranian Voivodeship (north-central Poland)
- Jadwiżyn, Drawsko County in West Pomeranian Voivodeship (north-west Poland)
- Jadwiżyn, Koszalin County in West Pomeranian Voivodeship (north-west Poland)
- Jadwiżyn, Szczecinek County in West Pomeranian Voivodeship (north-west Poland)
- Jadwiżyn, Wałcz County in West Pomeranian Voivodeship (north-west Poland)
