= Stawno =

Stawno may refer to the following places:

- Stawno, Greater Poland Voivodeship (west-central Poland)
- Stawno, Drawsko County in West Pomeranian Voivodeship (north-west Poland)
- Stawno, Goleniów County in West Pomeranian Voivodeship (north-west Poland)
- Stawno, Gryfice County in West Pomeranian Voivodeship (north-west Poland)
- Stawno, Kamień County in West Pomeranian Voivodeship (north-west Poland)
- Stawno, Myślibórz County in West Pomeranian Voivodeship (north-west Poland)
