= Bobrowo, West Pomeranian Voivodeship =

Bobrowo
- Village
- Location within Poland
- Coordinates: 53°31′N 16°4′E
- Country: Poland
- Voivodeship: West Pomeranian
- County: Drawsko
- Gmina: Złocieniec
- Population: 324

Bobrowo [bɔˈbrɔvɔ] (German: Dietersdorf) is a village in the administrative district of Gmina Złocieniec, within Drawsko County, West Pomeranian Voivodeship, in north-western Poland. It lies approximately 4 km (2 mi) east of Złocieniec, 18 km (11 mi) east of Drawsko Pomorskie, and 99 km (62 mi) east of the regional capital Szczecin.

The village has a population of 324.

== History ==
The village of Bobrowo in the West Pomeranian Voivodeship was likely established during the period of German eastward settlement (Ostsiedlung) in the Middle Ages. Historical records indicate that it was part of the Dramburg district and was mentioned in various regional documents over the centuries.
