= Wąsosze (lake) =

Lake in Poland

- Location within West Pomeranian Voivodeship
- Location: Gmina Złocieniec, West Pomeranian Voivodeship, Poland
- Coordinates: 53°29′44″N 16°04′22″E
- Primary outflows: Wąsowa
- Basin countries: Poland
- Surface area: 326.4 to 361.0 hectares (807 to 892 acres)
- Surface elevation: 121.4 metres (398 ft)

Wąsosze is a lake located in Gmina Złocieniec, West Pomeranian Voivodeship, Poland. The area has been reported as of varying size, being reported as 326.4 hectares (807 acres), 330.0 hectares (815 acres), and 361.0 hectares (892 acres). It is located at an elevation of 121.4 metres (398 ft).
