= Jarosław, West Pomeranian Voivodeship =

Jarosław
- Settlement
- Location within Poland
- Coordinates: 53°29′38″N 15°58′47″E
- Country: Poland
- Voivodeship: West Pomeranian
- County: Drawsko
- Gmina: Złocieniec
- Population: 2,007

Jarosław (Polish: [jaˈrɔswaf]; German: Marienau) is a settlement in the administrative district of Gmina Złocieniec, within Drawsko County, West Pomeranian Voivodeship, in north-western Poland. It lies approximately 5 km (3 mi) south-west of Złocieniec, 13 km (8 mi) east of Drawsko Pomorskie, and 93 km (58 mi) east of the regional capital Szczecin.

For the history of the region, see History of Pomerania.

The settlement has a population of 2,007.
