= Stawno, Drawsko County =

Stawno
- Village
- Location within Poland
- Coordinates: 53°28′N 15°58′E
- Country: Poland
- Voivodeship: West Pomeranian
- County: Drawsko
- Gmina: Złocieniec

Stawno [ˈstavnɔ] (formerly German Stöwen) is a village in the administrative district of Gmina Złocieniec, within Drawsko County, West Pomeranian Voivodeship, in north-western Poland. It lies approximately 8 km (5 mi) south-west of Złocieniec, 14 km (9 mi) south-east of Drawsko Pomorskie, and 92 km (57 mi) east of the regional capital Szczecin.

For the history of the region, see History of Pomerania.
