= Otto Neitzel =

German pianist, composer, teacher, and music director

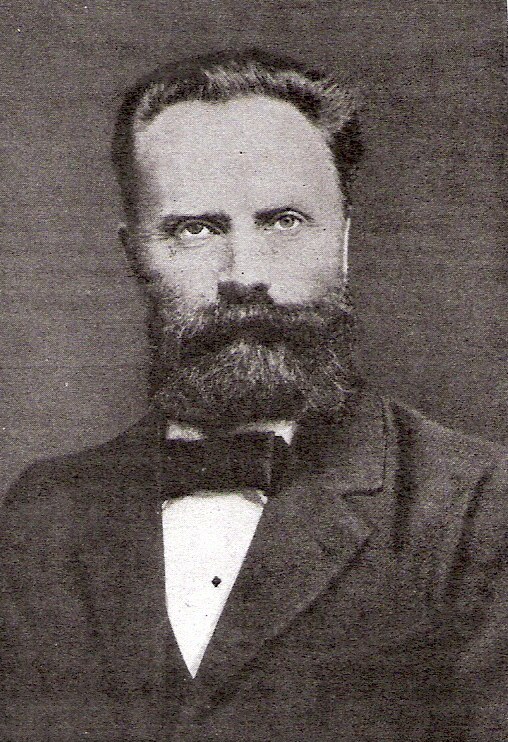
Otto Neitzel

Otto Neitzel (6 July 1852 – 10 March 1920) was a German composer, pianist, writer on music, and lecturer. Neitzel was born in the town of Falkenburg in Farther Pomerania (modern Złocieniec, Poland). His father, Gottfried Neitzel was a teacher and his mother, Louise (née Messerschmidt), was a housewife.

== Biography ==
At the age of 8, Neitzel toured his neighbourhood and cities, giving performances. This "Wonderkid" was praised for his ability to play the piano and move people's ears.

Famous people promoted him for his abilities, mainly:-

- Carl Loewe in Stettin
- Eduard Grell in Berlin
- Violinist Hubert Ries
- Wilhelm Taubert (composer)

His parents could not afford to pay for music lessons, but Bernhard Lösener, astonished by his music talent, sponsored him to finish his musical education.

In 1865, he left home and joined the Joachimsthaler Gymnasium in Berlin. While there, he continued to study music at the Neue Akademia der Tonkust by Theodore Kullak.

From 1873 to 1875, he was a student of Franz Liszt. In 1875, he wrote his dissertation "Die ästhetische Grenze der Programmmusik" (The Aesthetic Limit of Programme Music). Later, he went on a tour with Pauline Lucca (a soprano singer) and Pablo de Sarasate (a violinist).

In 1878, Neitzel was appointed director of the Musikverein in Strasbourg. From 1879 to 1881, he directed at the Strasbourg Stadtheater. Simultaneously, he worked at the Strasbourg Conservatory as a teacher.

The director of the Conservatoire de Strasbourg, Max Erdmannsdorfer, was impressed with his teaching skills. He recommended him to the Moscow Conservatory as a representative for the German Piano School. The Russian Piano School offered him the post of "Imperaorial-Russian" professor.

At this time, he met Sophie Romboi (an alto singer), and taught her music. Later, they married. In 1885, he moved to the Cologne Conservatory.

In 1897, he became the music editor at the Kolnische Zeitung and published articles as a journalist. In the same year, his first opera, Angela, was debuted in Halle.

Using the new technology of the time, the phonograph, on 23 January 1890, Neitzel recorded parts of Piano Concert No. 2 by Frédéric Chopin in Cologne at the European Edison Phonograph Recording Expedition's last session. This is one of the oldest music recordings in existence today.

He was invited to the US in the 1906-1907 winter, to play and hold lectures. There, he played Beethoven's G-major concerto in Philadelphia and Boston, directed by Karl Muck. In 1909, Neitzel directed Beethoven's Symphony No. 9 and Choral Fantasy. Because of its success, Muck encouraged him to direct the orchestra, but Neitzel eventually declined the offer.

In 1910, he recorded some of the Davidsbündlertänze by Robert Schumann on paper-tape-rolls with the Welte-Mignon reproducing piano. He supported and got along with Richard Wagner and Richard Strauss. In 1919, he became a professor at the Prussian Academy of Arts in Berlin.

He composed several operas. Neitzel died in Cologne on 10 March 1920. He had four daughters. One daughter became a pianist while another played harp in the orchestra.

== Works ==
Neitzel wrote and published plays steadily. His work includes six operas and many music pieces for the piano. The Spanish Dances (by Pablo de Sarasate) is among those that have been adapted for the piano, published in 1878. He also wrote several opera guides (for example, about Richard Wagner), books about Beethoven's symphonies and about Camille Saint-Saens. One of his best known works is Aus meiner musikanten-Mappe (Out of my musical potofolio).

=== Compositions ===
- Musiques pour piano et chant: opus 4, 5, 11, 25-27, 33, 36, 43
- Concerto for piano & orchestra, Op. 26 (Published: Bayreuth, Carl Giessel, 1900) [Score & parts in Fleisher Collection, Phil- adelphia]
- Das Leben ein Traum, Fantasie für Violine und Orchester

=== Operas ===
- Angela (Opera), Halle 1887
- Dido (Opera), 1888
- Der alte Dessauer (Opera), 1889, Wiesbaden
- Die Barbarina (Opera), 1904, Wiesbaden
- Walhall in Not, 1905, Bremen
- Der Richter von Kaschau (Opera), 1916, Darmstadt

=== Writings (books) ===
- Deutscher Opernführer. Der Führer durch die deutsche Oper, Magnus-Verlag o. J., ISBN 978-3-88400-121-9
- Richard Wagners Opern. In Text, Musik und Szene, Magnus-Verlag 1983, ISBN 978-3-88400-122-6
- Der Führer durch die Oper des Theaters der Gegenwart, Text, Musik und Scene erläuternd, 3 Bände, Band 2: Richard Wagn- ers Opern, A.G. Liebeskind, Leipzig 1890-1893
- Beethovens Symphonien - nach ihrem Stimmengehalt erläutert (mit zahlreichen Notenbeispielen), Tonger, Köln 1891
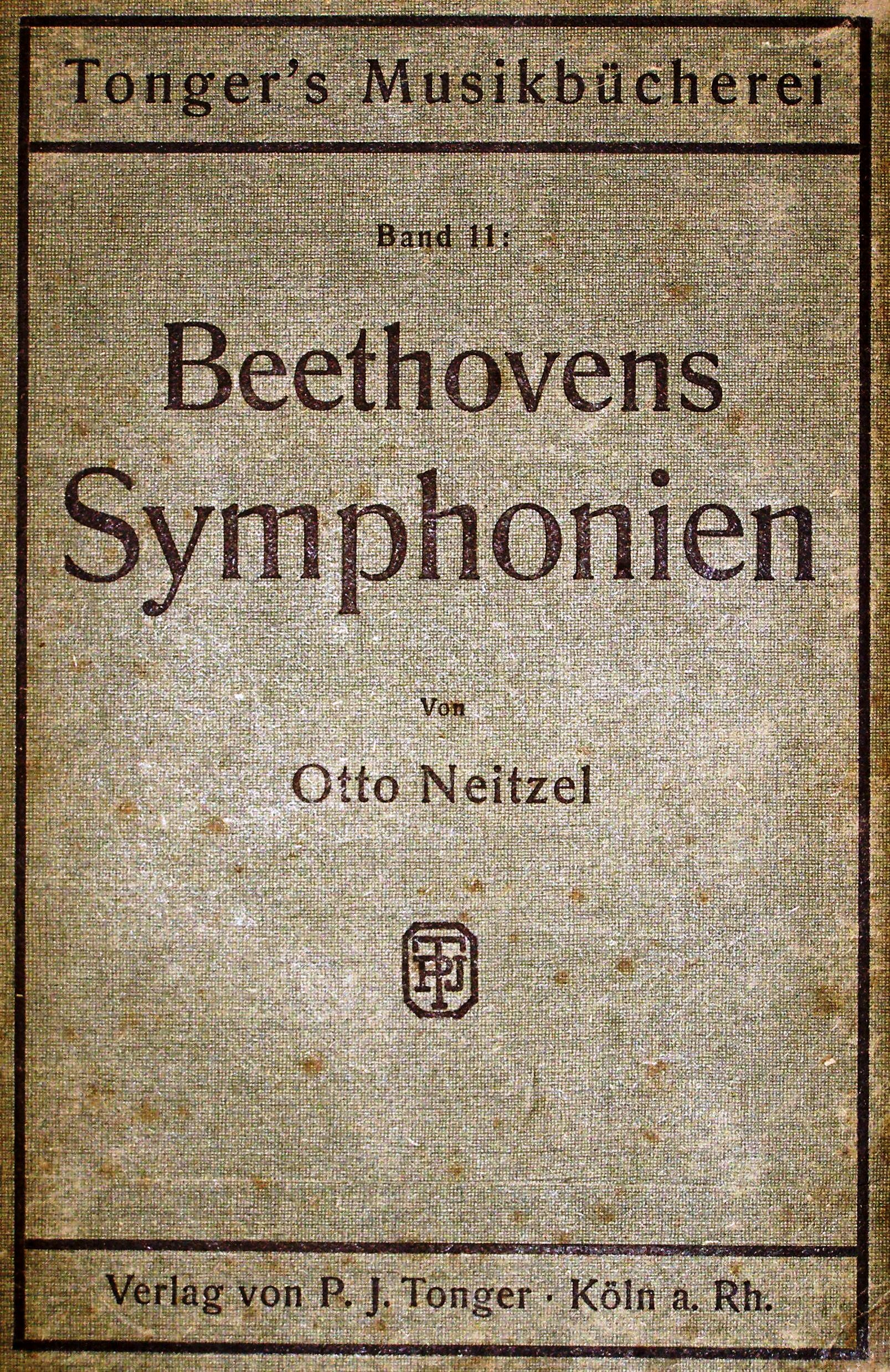
Hard Cover (Outside)

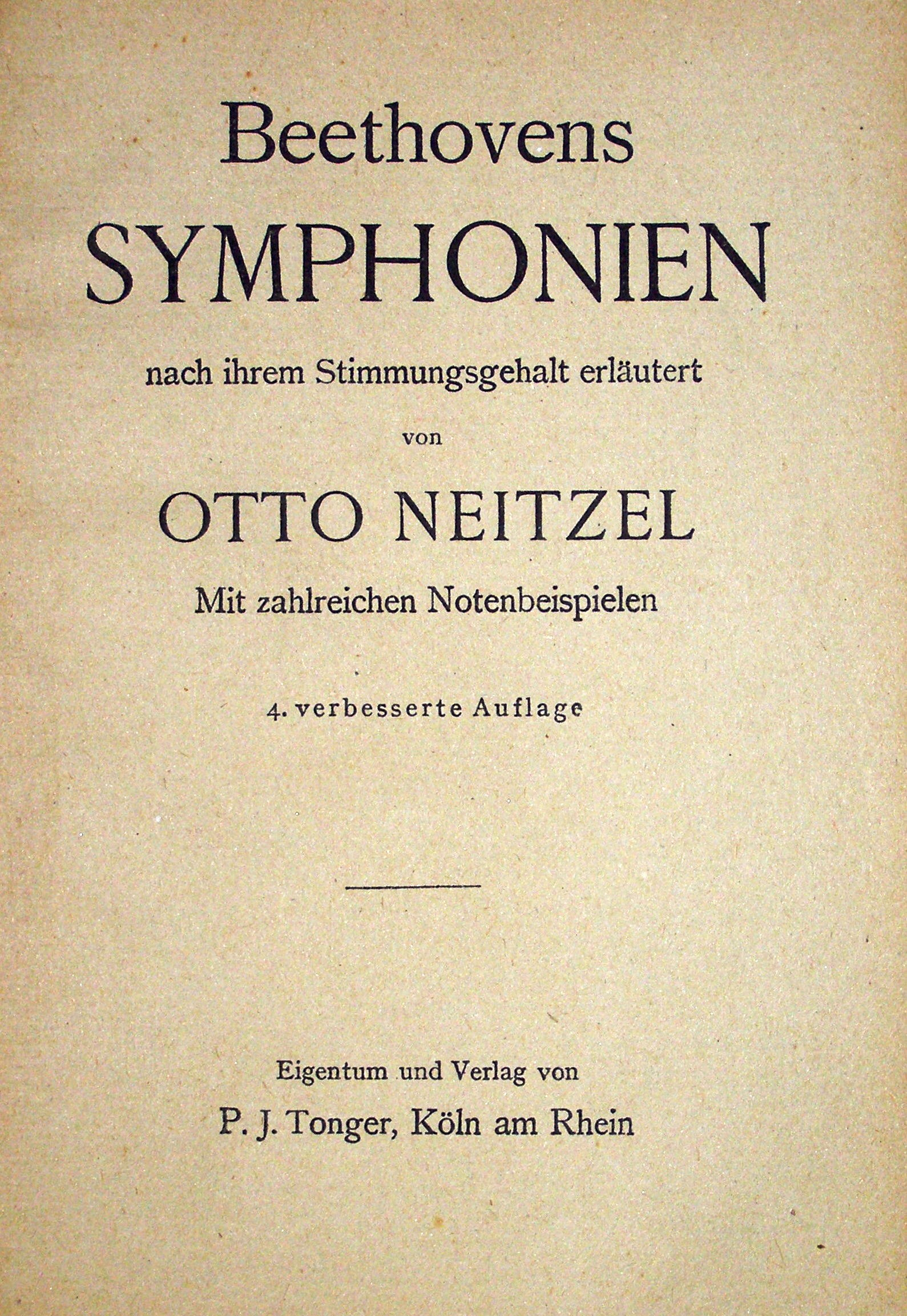
Inside (Cover)
- Thematischer Leitfaden durch das Programm des 69. Niederrheinischen Musikfestes, Köln 1892.
- Camille Saint-Saëns, Harmonie Verlagsgesellschaft, Berlin 1899
- Einführung in Hauseggers Zinnober, Ahn, Köln 1898
- (mit L. Riemann), Musikästhetische Betrachtungen, Breitkopf und Härtel, Leipzig 1907, 3. Auflage: 1909
- Gems of Antiquity, covering a period from 1240 to (1909), compilation of songs.
- Aus meiner Musikantenmappe - Ernstes und Heiteres, Loesdau, Berlin 1914 (Rev.3,4 p. 27,6)
- Der Führer durch die Deutsche Oper, Cotta, Stuttgart 1920.

=== Records (Rev. A, B) ===
- Edison Phonograph: 23 January 1890 at Rudolf Ibach und Sohn am Neumarkt in Köln, 1.24 Min., Aufnahme von Adelbert Theodor Wangemann, Auszüge 3. Satz "Klavierkonzert No2" f-Moll, Frédéric Chopin. Source: Thomas Edison National Histori- cal Park, West Orange, NJ, USA.
- Welter-Flügel: 2 Lochstreifenrollen, ca. 1910, ca. 5 Min., "Davidsbündler Tänze", Robert Schumann, Musik-instrumenten-mu- seum Berlin, Deutschland.

== Literature ==
- Pommersche Lebensbilder, Band 1: Pommern des 19. und 20. Jahrhunderts, edited by Martin Wehrmann et al., Stettin 1934.
- "Eintrag in der Deutschen Biographischen Enzyklopädie" (Rev.1)
- "Hans Engel: Otto Neitzel", in: Pommersche Lebensbilder, Band 1: Pommern des 19. und 20. Jahrhunderts (A. Hofmeister, Erich Randt und M. Wehrmann, Hrsg.), Sauniers, Stettin 1934, S. 391-394.
