= Kosobudy, Drawsko County =

Kosobudy
- Village
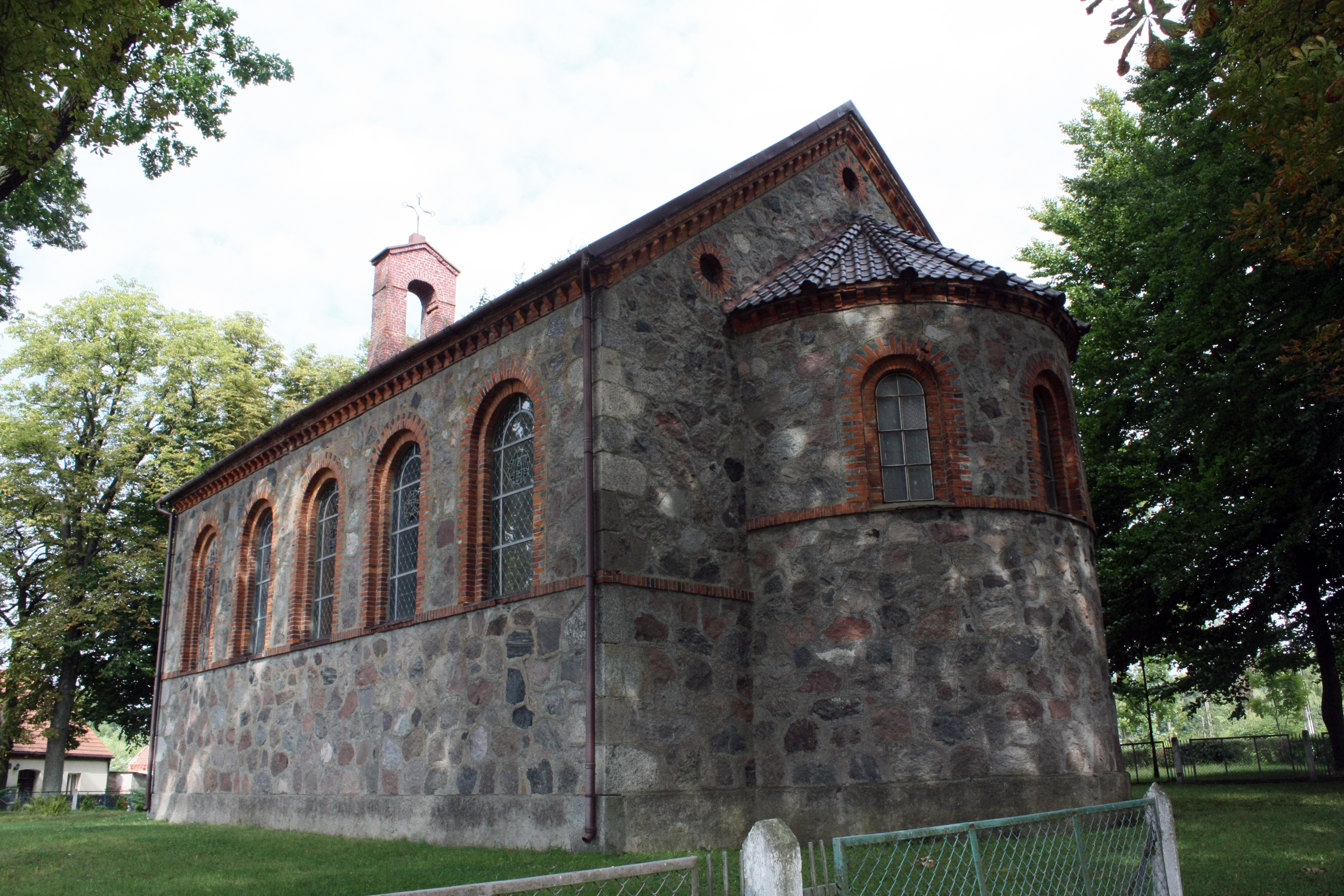
- Saint Joseph church in Kosobudy

- Location within Poland
- Coordinates: 53°35′N 15°56′E
- Country: Poland
- Voivodeship: West Pomeranian
- County: Drawsko
- Gmina: Złocieniec
- Time zone: UTC+1 (CET)
  - Summer (DST): UTC+2 (CEST)

Kosobudy [kɔsɔˈbudɨ] (formerly German Birkholz) is a village in the administrative district of Gmina Złocieniec, within Drawsko County, West Pomeranian Voivodeship, in north-western Poland. It lies approximately 9 km (6 mi) north-west of Złocieniec, 11 km (7 mi) north-east of Drawsko Pomorskie, and 92 km (57 mi) east of the regional capital Szczecin.
