= Kazimierz Jodkowski =

Polish philosopher and professor

- Born: Kazimierz Walenty Jodkowski; February 14, 1950 (age 76); Złocieniec, Polish People's Republic
- Education: John Paul II Catholic University of Lublin
- Scientific career
- Fields: Philosophy
- Workplaces: Maria Curie-Skłodowska University; Zielona Góra Pedagogical University; University of Zielona Góra

Kazimierz Walenty Jodkowski (born 14 February 1950) is a Polish philosopher and professor in the humanities, specializing in the philosophy of science and natural philosophy and natural sciences, including topics such as intertheoretical incommensurability and the demarcation problem. He is the creator of the book series Realizm. Racjonalność. Relatywizm (Realism. Rationality. Relativism) and the online journal Filozoficzne Aspekty Genezy.

== Biography ==
Kazimierz Jodkowski was born on 14 February 1950 to Tadeusz and Stefania Jodkowski. He completed primary school in Złocieniec and general secondary school in Drawsko Pomorskie.

He studied philosophy at the John Paul II Catholic University of Lublin, earning his master's degree with distinction in 1974. His master's thesis focused on the cosmology of Edward Arthur Milne, supervised by Stanisław Mazierski. In 1983, he defended his doctorate in philosophy at the Faculty of Philosophy and Sociology of the Maria Curie-Skłodowska University in Lublin, exploring the anti-cumulative theories of Thomas Kuhn and Paul Feyerabend. From January to May 1990, he held a fellowship at the Commonwealth University-Lock Haven. In 1992, he obtained his habilitation in philosophy from the Adam Mickiewicz University in Poznań with the dissertation Communities of Scholars, Paradigms, and Scientific Revolutions. On 28 April 2000, he was awarded the title of professor in the humanities.

Jodkowski began his academic career on 1 April 1975 at the Institute of Philosophy within the Faculty of Philosophy and Sociology at the Maria Curie-Skłodowska University in Lublin. From 1985 to 1994, he served as head of the methodology of sciences section in the Department of Logic and Methodology of Sciences at the Maria Curie-Skłodowska University. In October 1995, he joined the Department of Logic and Methodology of Sciences at the Zielona Góra Pedagogical University. During the 1980s, he distributed uncensored literature among the Maria Curie-Skłodowska University staff, leading to surveillance by the security service. From 1999 to 2002, he was director of the Institute of Philosophy at the Zielona Góra Pedagogical University.

In 1984, alongside Zbysław Muszyński, Jacek Paśniczek, and Jan Pomorski, he founded the philosophical book series Realizm. Racjonalność. Relatywizm (Realism. Rationality. Relativism), which has published over 40 volumes.

In 2004, he initiated the establishment of the "Science and Religion" local group in Zielona Góra, serving as its academic supervisor. Within this group, he launched the online journal Filozoficzne Aspekty Genezy in 2004, acting as editor-in-chief until 2010.

In 2015, the University of Zielona Góra published a jubilee volume in recognition of his scholarly contributions.

He married Gerarda Martyniuk (born 1951), with whom he has two daughters, Justyna (born 1980) and Marta (born 1988).

Jodkowski was an activist in the Real Politics Union and ran for the Polish Sejm in the 2001 Polish parliamentary election on the Civic Platform list.

== Scholarly views ==
Jodkowski's research investigates what distinguishes science from non-science and what criteria should be used for this demarcation. He argues that no effective criterion for the demarcation problem exists, asserting that there is no direct sensory contact with reality and that the human nervous system can only produce three-dimensional simulations of the surrounding world.

He emphasizes the critical role of philosophy in scientific development, noting that science often relies on philosophical support. Severing science from philosophy would disconnect it from sources of heuristic ideas, reducing alternative explanations of reality and ultimately "drying up" science itself.

A third area of interest is the interaction between science and religion. He contends that modern science cannot exist without the assumption of naturalism, which prohibits invoking supernatural causes to explain the world, whereas theism affirms their reality. Evolutionism is closely tied to naturalism, excluding theistic worldviews (though not deistic ones). He argues that the view of science and religion as non-overlapping domains is untenable.

He views science as a societal construct, secondary to society's existence. Politicians, representing society, have the right to determine science funding, as society's survival outweighs science's. Consequently, in conflicts, non-scientific values often dominate scientific ones.

Jodkowski has set a high bar for creationists, arguing they must demonstrate not only that science cannot explain something naturalistically but also that such an explanation is impossible. He developed the concept of epistemic frames of reference, later elaborated by Krzysztof Kilian.

== Reception ==
Wojciech Sady contested Jodkowski's claim that scientific creationism leads to theism, suggesting it might only temporarily undermine belief in Darwinism and at most support belief in non-material causes of life. Sady criticized Jodkowski for imposing unfeasible demands on creationists and questioned the clarity of terms like "naturalistic" and "laws of physics". He argued that faith in a literal Bible remains faith, regardless of scientific creationism's achievements.

Dariusz Sagan noted that Jodkowski's discussion of epistemic frames of reference remains broad and abstract, using the term ambiguously.

== Publications ==
- Teza o niewspółmierności w ujęciu Thomasa S. Kuhna i Paula K. Feyerabenda (The Thesis of Incommensurability in the Views of Thomas S. Kuhn and Paul K. Feyerabend), Lublin, 1984. ISBN 83-00-00888-8.
- Wspólnoty uczonych, paradygmaty i rewolucje naukowe (Communities of Scholars, Paradigms, and Scientific Revolutions), Lublin, 1990. ISBN 83-227-0322-8.
- Metodologiczne aspekty kontrowersji ewolucjonizm-kreacjonizm, Realizm. Racjonalność. Relatywizm (Methodological Aspects of the Evolutionism-Creationism Controversy, Realism. Rationality. Relativism), vol. 35, UMCS Publishing, Lublin, 1998. ISBN 83-227-1321-5.
- Spór ewolucjonizmu z kreacjonizmem. Podstawowe pojęcia i poglądy (The Evolutionism vs. Creationism Dispute: Basic Concepts and Views), Library of Philosophical Aspects of Genesis, vol. 1, Megas Publishing, Warsaw, 2007. ISBN 83-901-413-7-X.

== Awards ==
In 1999, he received the First Degree Award from the Minister of National Education for his monograph Metodologiczne aspekty kontrowersji ewolucjonizm-kreacjonizm (Methodological Aspects of the Evolutionism-Creationism Controversy).

== Sources ==
- Bylica, Piotr; Kilian, Krzysztof J.; Sagan, Dariusz (2015). "Wstęp" [Introduction]. Kazimierza Jodkowskiego koncepcja epistemicznych układów odniesienia a teizm naturalistyczny Johna Polkinghorne'a [Kazimierz Jodkowski’s Concept of Epistemic Frames of Reference and John Polkinghorne's Naturalistic Theism] (in Polish). Zielona Góra: University of Zielona Góra. ISBN 978-83-7842-178-8.
- Sagan, Dariusz (2018). "Jaki "artyficjalizm" stanowi epistemiczny układ odniesienia nauki" [What "Artificialism" Constitutes the Epistemic Frame of Reference of Science]. Filozoficzne Aspekty Genezy (in Polish). 15. ISSN 2299-0356.
