= Drawsko Landscape Park =

Nature reserve in north-western Poland

- Drawski Park Krajobrazowy
- IUCN category V (protected landscape/seascape)
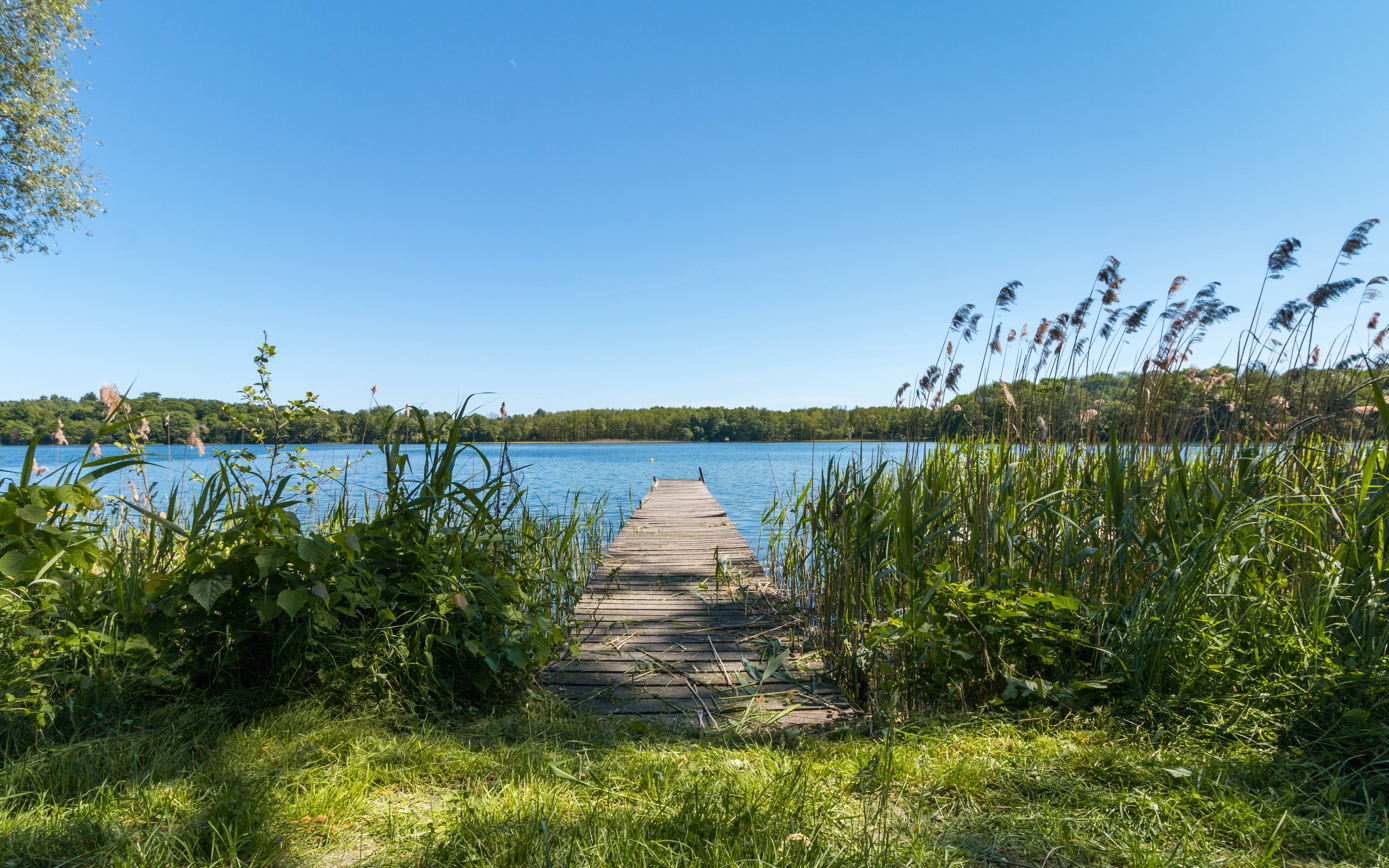
- Jetty on Drawsko Lake at Uraz
- Interactive map of Drawsko Landscape Park
- Location: West Pomeranian Voivodeship
- Coordinates: 53°40′N 16°10′E
- Area: 414.3 km^{2} (160.0 sq mi)
- Established: 1979

Drawsko Landscape Park (Drawski Park Krajobrazowy) is a protected area (Landscape Park) in north-western Poland, established in 1979, covering an area of 414.3 square kilometres (160.0 sq mi).

The Park lies within West Pomeranian Voivodeship: in Drawsko County (Gmina Czaplinek, Gmina Ostrowice, Gmina Złocieniec), Szczecinek County (Gmina Barwice, Gmina Borne Sulinowo) and Świdwin County (Gmina Połczyn-Zdrój).

There are valuable landscape objects, lakes (the largest Drawsko), moraine embankments and erratic boulders. There are over 40 species of legally protected plants in the park, and the avifauna consists of 148 species of breeding birds (including eagles, herons, cranes, black storks, cormorants). Among the fish there are, among others pike perch, perch, eel and whitefish.

Within the Landscape Park are eight nature reserves. Since 2012, the park has been part of the Complex of Landscape Parks of the West Pomeranian Voivodeship in Szczecin.

In 2020, the Landscape Parks Complex of the West Pomeranian Voivodeship signed a contract for the preparation of a protection plan for the park.
