= Jadwiżyn, Drawsko County =

Jadwiżyn
- Settlement
- Location within Poland
- Coordinates: 53°37′10″N 16°7′16″E
- Country: Poland
- Voivodeship: West Pomeranian
- County: Drawsko
- Gmina: Złocieniec

Jadwiżyn [jadˈviʐɨn] (German: Charlottenhof) is a settlement in the administrative district of Gmina Złocieniec, within Drawsko County, West Pomeranian Voivodeship, in north-western Poland. It lies approximately 13 km (8 mi) north-east of Złocieniec, 24 km (15 mi) north-east of Drawsko Pomorskie, and 105 km (65 mi) east of the regional capital Szczecin.

For the history of the region, see History of Pomerania.
