= Drawa National Park =

National park in Poland

- Drawieński Park Narodowy
- IUCN category II (national park)
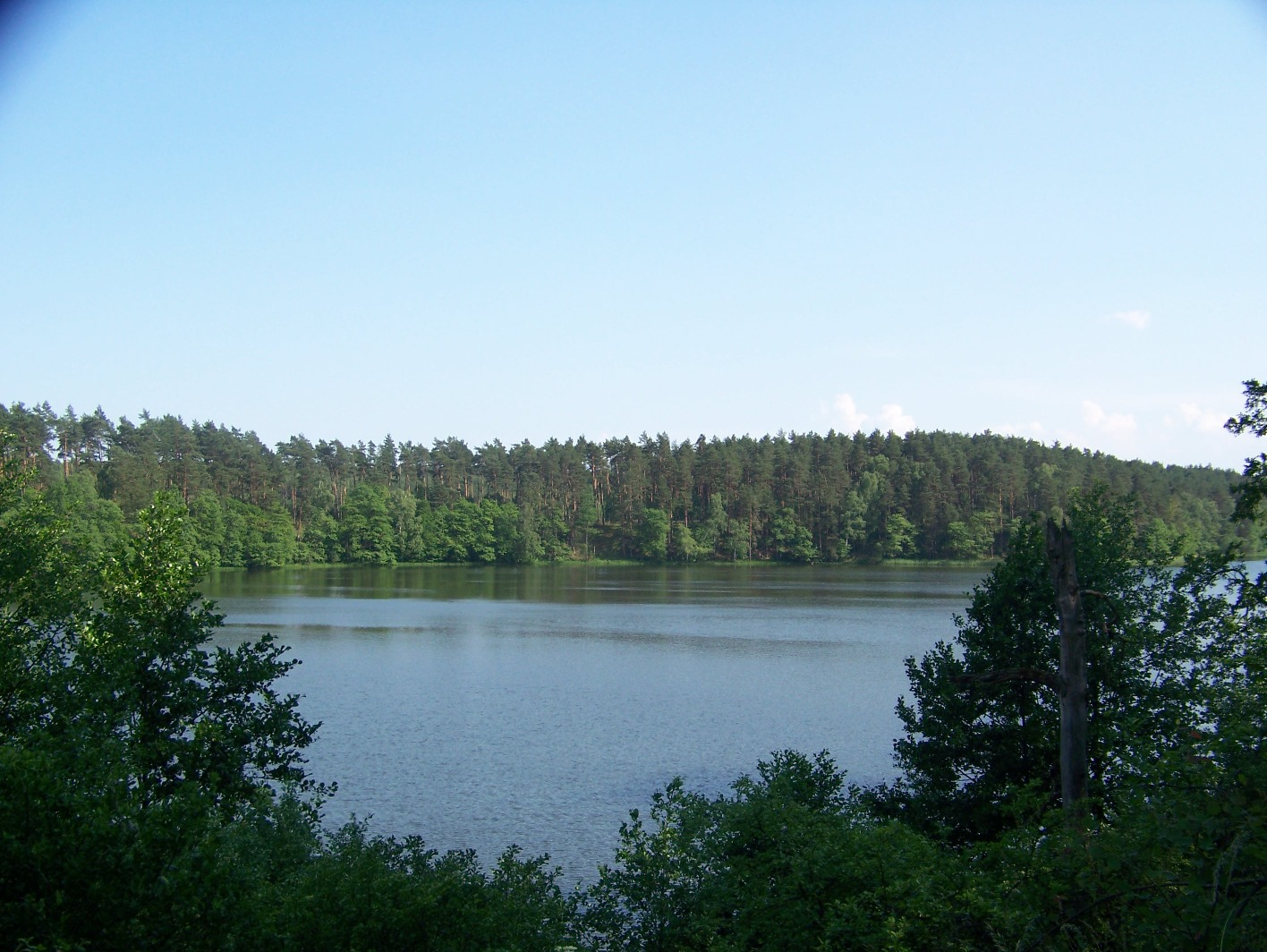
- Ostrowieckie Lake Park logo with European otter
- Interactive map of Drawa National Park
- Location: North-west Poland
- Coordinates: 53°08′N 15°27′E
- Area: 113.42 km^{2} (43.79 sq mi)
- Established: 1990
- Governing body: Ministry of the Environment
- Website: Official website

Drawa National Park (Polish: Drawieński Park Narodowy) is located in north-western Poland, on the border of Greater Poland, Lubusz and West Pomeranian Voivodeships. The park is a part of the huge Drawsko Forest (Puszcza Drawska), which lies on the vast Drawsko Plain. It takes its name from the River Drawa. The national park was created in 1990 and initially covered 86.91 km^{2}. Later, it was enlarged to 113.42 square kilometres (43.79 sq mi) of which forests account for 96.14 km^{2} (3.68 km^{2} is designated as a strictly protected area), and water bodies cover 9.37 km^{2}. The park is planned to get expanded onto the lower Oder area.

== Geography ==
Over 80 percent of its area is covered with forests – the monumental Drawa Forest stretching from the Drawa Lake District to the Noteć River. It is mostly made up of beech and pine trees.

There are picturesque and deep valleys of the Drawa and Plociczna rivers as well as numerous water channels, lakes and peat-bogs. In some places the height can vary by 30 meters within 500 meters. The highest hill (106 m) is located near the Martew lake, in northern part of the park. The soil in the park is of poor quality and it mainly consists of sand.

== Protection needs ==
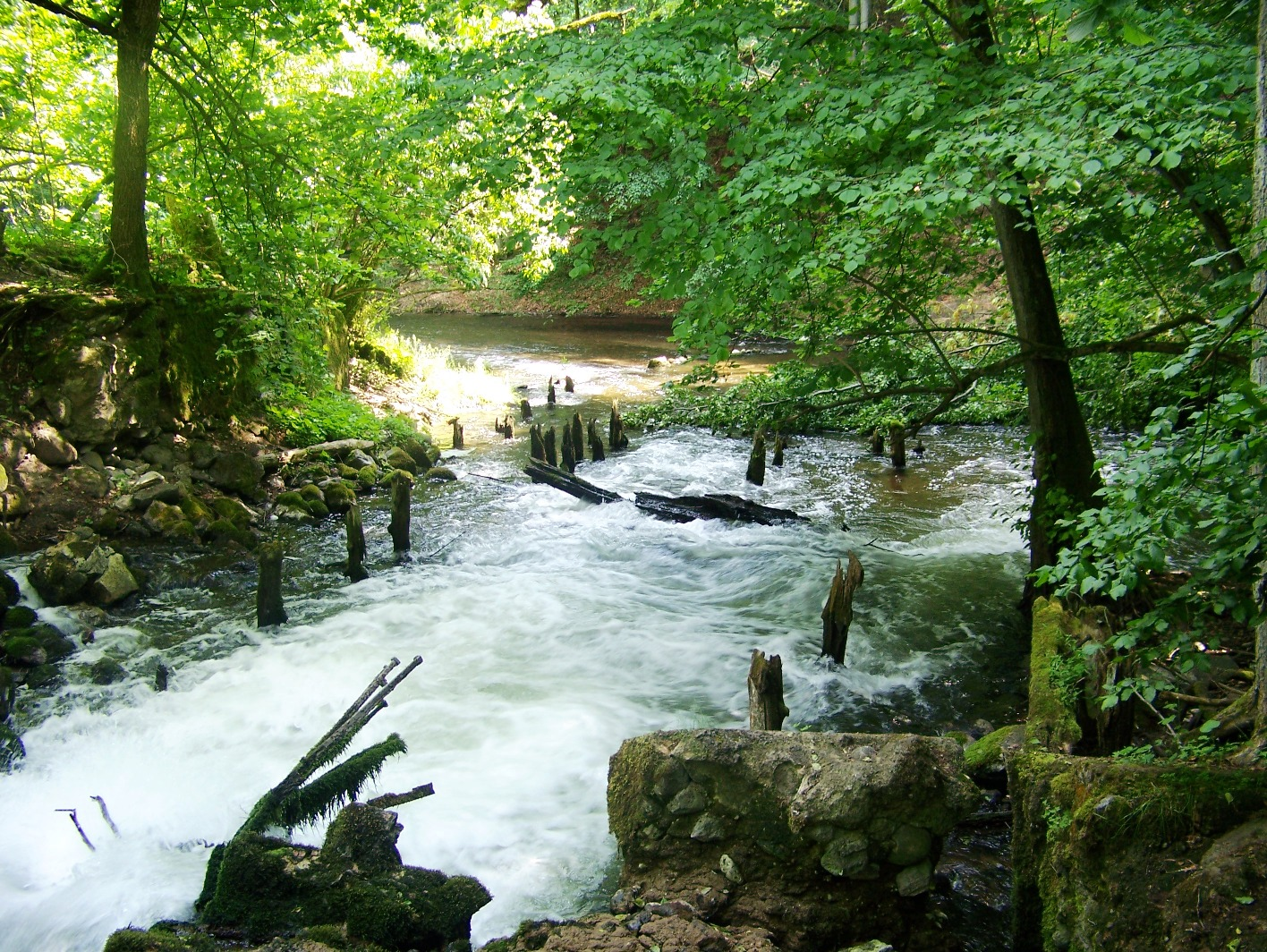
Plocziczna River, ruins of old eel trap

One of main reasons for the creation of the park was the need for to protect valuable areas along the Drawa and Plocziczna rivers. The Drawa creates interesting valleys and hollows and 40 km of the river is within the borders of the park. The river flows at a quite fast pace, which makes it similar to rivers located in mountains. The Drawa kayaking trail is one of the most picturesque in Poland. Lakes include the meromictic lake Czarne (3.7 km^{2}).

=== Flora and Funga ===
There are several interesting species of flora in Drawski National Park, among them 210 species of mushrooms, and oak trees up to 400 years old. The oldest trees are strictly protected in the Radecin Preserve. Trees older than 81 years old cover 40% of the forested area of the park.

=== Fauna ===
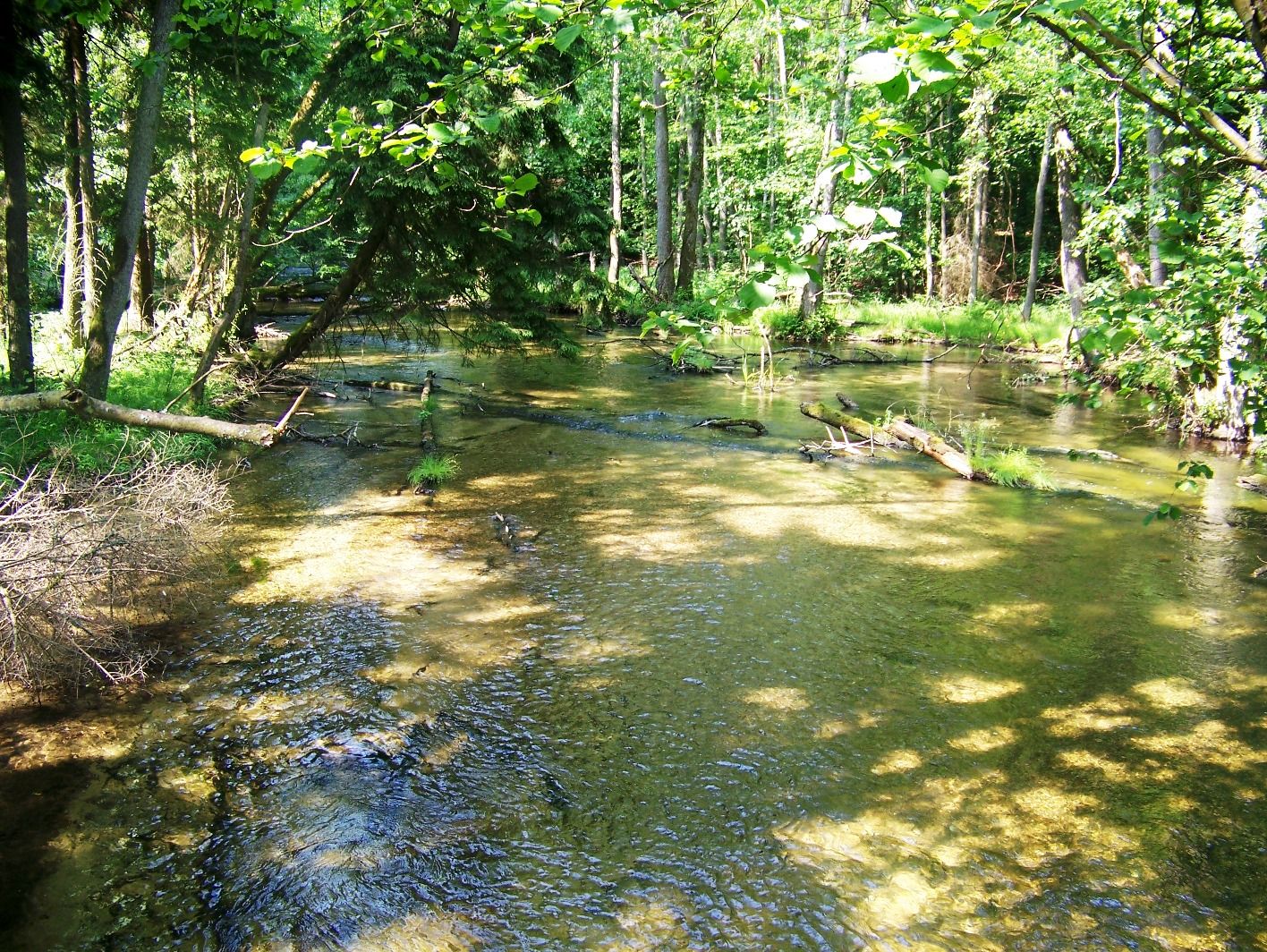
Drawa National Park near Węgornia

There are 129 species of birds, 40 species of mammals, 7 species of reptiles and 13 species of amphibians. The good quality of water in the lakes and rivers enables various species of fish to flourish.

Roe deer, red deer and wild boar are very common in the national park. The park also hosts high populations of eurasian otter and eurasian beaver. Occasionally moose and gray wolf can be found in the park.

The area in the past, when it was located on the border between Poland and Western Pomerania (later Prussia), was regarded as unsuitable for human settlement and only since the 17th century have its forests been cleared for settlement.

The park is crossed by four attractive tourist trails, for both walking and kayaking. There are camping sites and within some distance hotels. The number of visiting tourists has been increasing year on year.

The park has its headquarters in the town of Drawno, in Choszczno County.
