= John Paul II Catholic University of Lublin =

Catholic university in Lublin, Poland

Coordinates: 51°14′52″N 22°32′41″E

- Katolicki Uniwersytet Lubelski Jana Pawła II
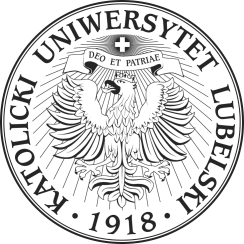
- Latin: Catholica Universitas Lublinensis Ioannis Pauli II
- Type: Private Catholic university
- Established: 27 July 1918
- Affiliations: EUA; Socrates-Erasmus
- Religious affiliation: Catholic Church
- Rector: Miroslaw Kalinowski
- Students: 8,306 (2024)
- Location: Al. Racławickie 14, 20–950, Lublin, Poland
- Website: kul.lublin.pl

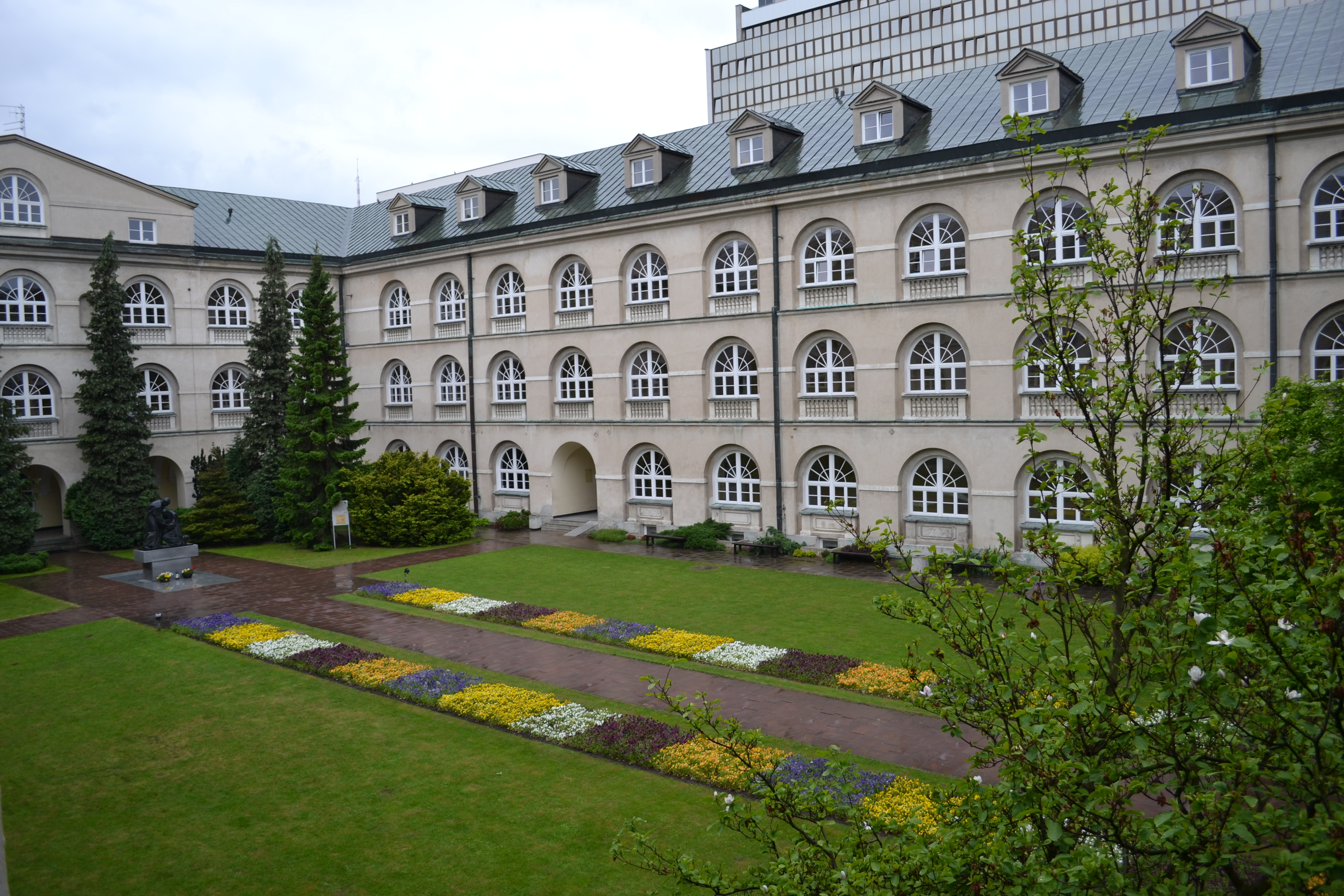
Courtyard

John Paul II Catholic University of Lublin (Polish: Katolicki Uniwersytet Lubelski Jana Pawła II, Latin: Universitas Catholica Lublinensis Ioannis Pauli II, abbreviation KUL) is a university in Lublin, Poland, established in 1918.

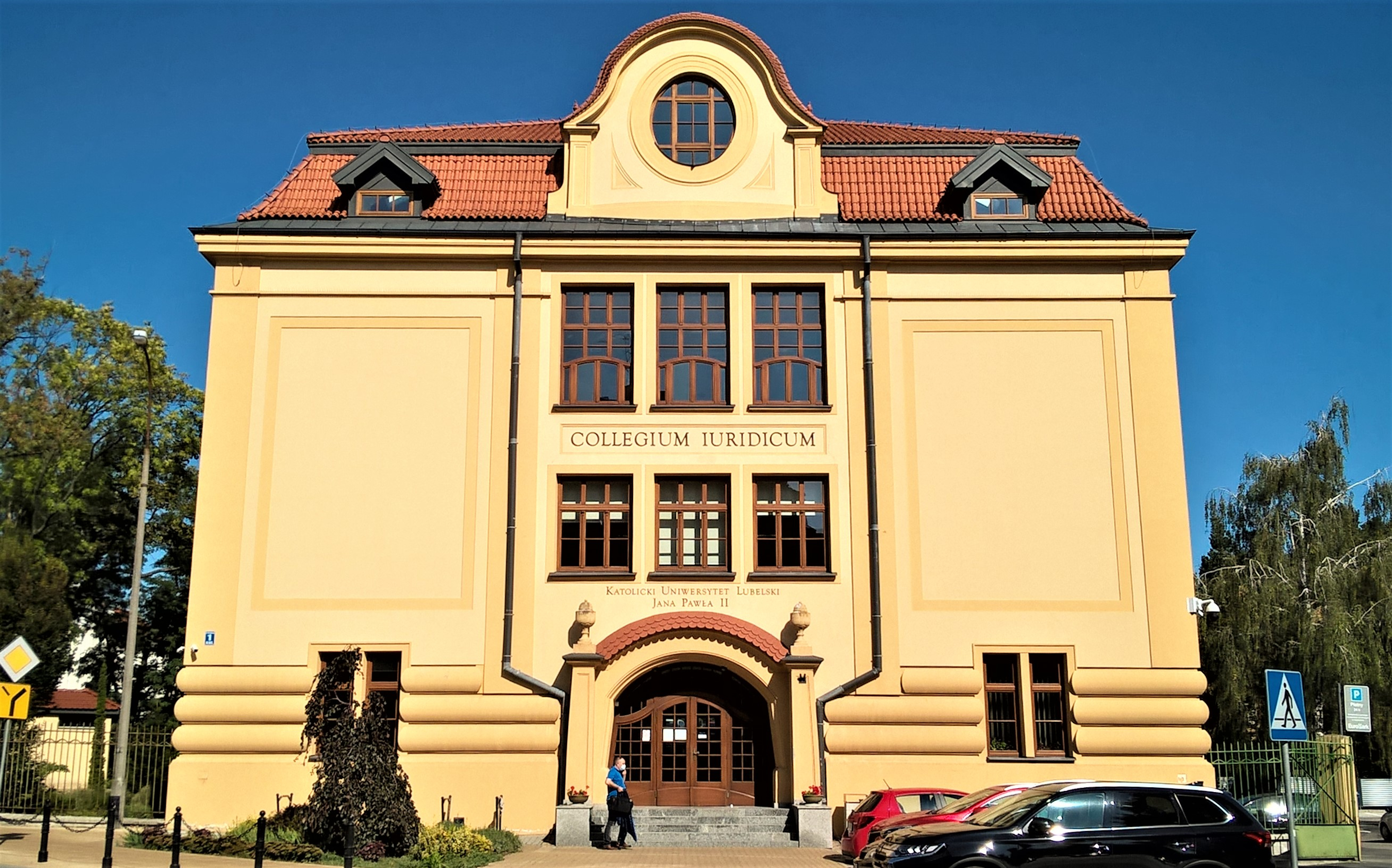
Collegium Iuridicum

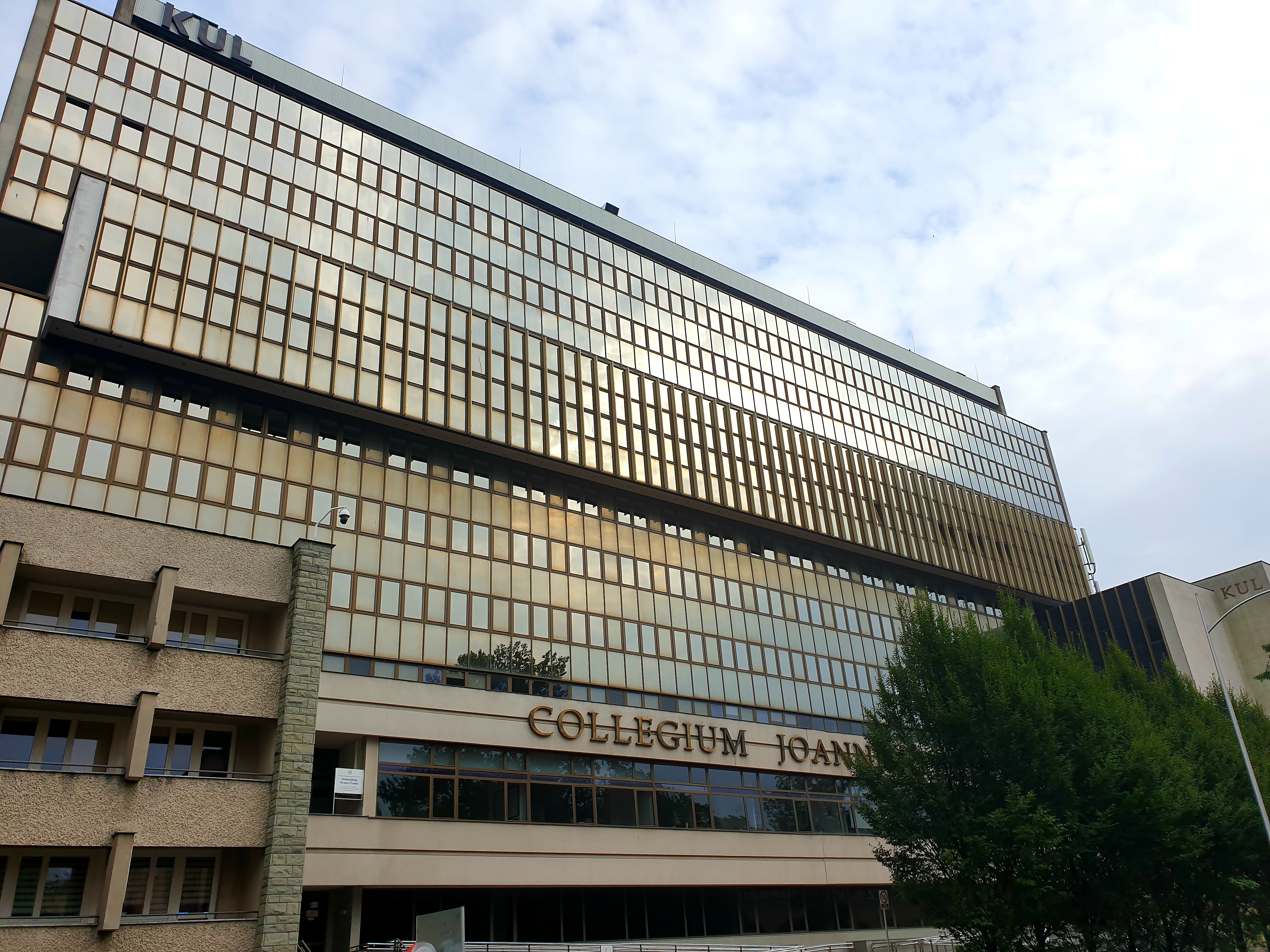
Collegium Joannis Pauli II

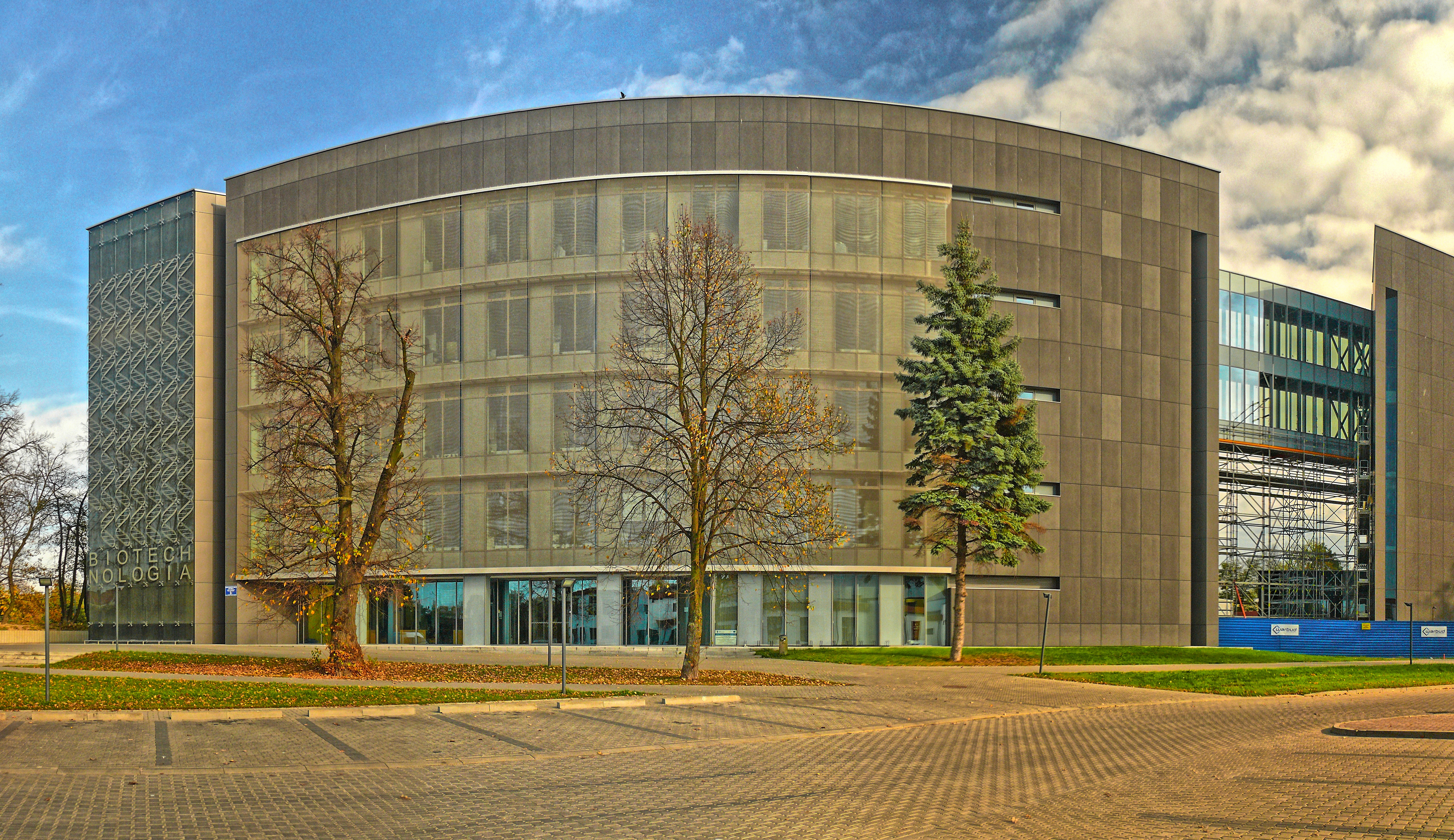
Faculty of Biotechnology

== History ==
Father Idzi Benedykt Radziszewski founded the university in 1918. Vladimir Lenin allowed the priest to take the library and equipment of the Saint Petersburg Roman Catholic Theological Academy to Poland to launch the university just as Poland regained its independence.

The aim of the university was to be a modern place of higher education that would conduct research in the spirit of harmony between science and faith. The university sought to produce a new Catholic intelligentsia that would play a leading role in Poland. The number of students increased from 399 in 1918–19 to 1440 in 1937–38. This growth was interrupted by the outbreak of the Second World War and Nazi Germany's occupation of Poland. Of all the universities located in the German-occupied territory, the University of Lublin was the only one to resume work in October 1939. On 23 November 1939, the Nazis executed a number of academic workers, including, among others, professors Michał Niechaj and Czesław Martyniak.

The university was ordered to shut down, and its buildings were converted into a military hospital. Nevertheless, the university carried on its teaching activities in secret. After the invasion of Lublin in July 1944 by the Red Army, the university reopened on 21 August 1944. Since then, the university has functioned without interruption. The university stayed open during the years Poland was under Communist control between 1944 and 1989, though some of its faculties did not. The faculties of law, social science and education were shut down between 1953 and 1956. It was the only independent, Catholic university in existence in the entire Soviet bloc. Given that the Communist governments all insisted on having a total monopoly of control over educational institutions, the preservation of its independence was a great achievement.

The university was often harassed in various ways by the Communist authorities, especially in the 1950s and the 1960s. The university faculty were under frequent surveillance by the secret police. Some faculties were periodically denied by the state the right to grant graduate degrees. The employment prospects of its graduates were limited.

Despite the difficulties, the university's independence was maintained, and it never adopted Marxist dogmas taught at all the other state universities. It served as a haven for students who were expelled from state universities for political reasons.

After the fall of Communism in Poland in 1989, the university has flourished, quadrupling its student population and greatly expanding its campus. In 2010, the university was involved in a scandal concerning the granting of PhDs by departments that were not allowed to grant them, due to not having a sufficient number of academic staff.

== Rankings ==
The university has had a steady advance in university rankings. In 2011, it was placed 8th among all Polish universities. Also in 2011, Wprost magazine ranked it 15th among humanity universities. Before that, in 2006, Newsweek Polska ranked the university 54th among all Polish universities.

In 2011–12, the university's philosophy program was ranked first in Poland by the Polish Accreditation Agency, distinguished twice, receiving 9 million PLN total in grants that year as a result.

== Notable alumni and professors ==
- Pope John Paul II (Karol Wojtyła), the most famous person associated with the university. Wojtyła earned a licentiate in theology in July 1947, and successfully defended his doctoral thesis entitled Doctrina de fide apud S. Ioannem a Cruce (Doctrine of Faith in St. John of the Cross) in philosophy on 19 June 1948 at the Pontifical University of Saint Thomas Aquinas, Angelicum in Rome. Although his doctoral work was unanimously approved in June 1948, he was denied the degree because he could not afford to print the text of his dissertation (an Angelicum rule). In December of that year, a revised text of his dissertation was approved by the theological faculty of Jagiellonian University in Kraków, and Wojtyła was awarded the degree. He became a part-time teacher of philosophy at KUL starting in 1954, sharing his time between teaching in Lublin and doing his pastoral work in Kraków. After he became archbishop of Kraków in 1963 and a cardinal in 1967, his duties limited the time he was able to spend teaching in Lublin, and his students often commuted to his lectures in Kraków. His involvement with the university continued until he was elected pope in 1978. All of his philosophical works were published in Lublin.
- Andrzej Szostek, a Marian order priest who was a student of the future Pope. Stayed on as a professor until 2020 and served as the university's rector between 1998 and 2004.
- Stefan Wyszyński, Cardinal Primate of Poland
- Servant of God Jacek Woroniecki (1878–1949), theologian, philosopher, Dominican lecturer at the University of Lublin in moral theology, rector of the university (1922–1924)
- Michał Heller, priest, academic and philosopher, awarded with Templeton Prize in 2008
- Józef Życiński, priest, Roman Catholic Metropolitan Archbishop, academic
- Edward Stachura, poet and writer
- Janusz Krupski, historian
- Janusz Palikot, politician, activist and businessman
- Wojciech Siemion, stage and film actor
- Beata Mazurek, politician, Deputy Marshal of the Sejm
- Józef Milik, priest, Bible scholar
- Jerzy Popiełuszko, a Polish Roman Catholic priest who became associated with the opposition Solidarity trade union in communist Poland. He has been recognized as a martyr by the Roman Catholic Church, and was beatified on 6 June 2010.
- Paweł Brodzisz, a Polish painter, photographer, graphic artist, he is also a regionalist, focusing on the Lublin and Silesia regions.
- Jerzy Kłoczowski, one of the greatest Polish historians of the 20th century
- Bogdan Borusewicz, politician, senator, communist dissident, Marshal of the Senate
- Kazimierz Nycz, Catholic priest, Cardinal, Archbishop of Warsaw
- Agnieszka Dudzińska, sociologist
- Ivan Bazarko, lawyer and political activist
- Kazimierz Jodkowski, philosopher and professor

== See also ==
- List of modern universities in Europe (1801–1945)
- Lublin Thomism
