= Agnieszka Dudzińska =

Polish sociologist

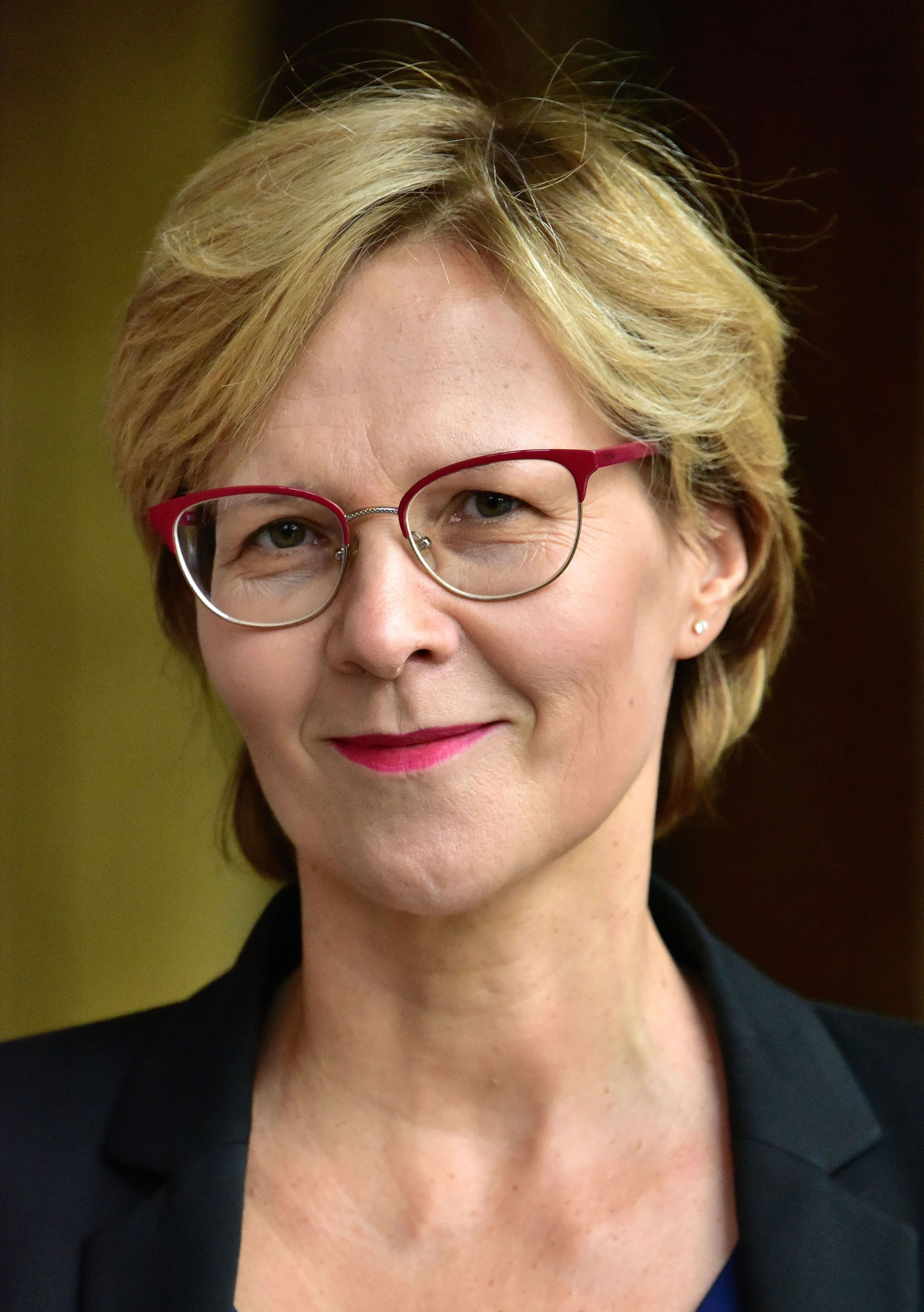
- Born: Poland
- Education: John Paul II Catholic University of Lublin; Polish Academy of Sciences
- Scientific career
- Fields: Sociology
- Workplaces: University of Warsaw

Agnieszka Dudzińska is a Polish sociologist. She is a professor of sociology at the University of Warsaw. She is also an advocate for housing and the welfare of disabled people in Poland, and has been nominated twice for the position of Ombudsman for Children in the government of Poland.

== Academic positions and research ==
Dudzińska attended the John Paul II Catholic University of Lublin, where she obtained a degree in sociology in 1992. In 2005 she began working at the Institute of Political Studies at the Polish Academy of Sciences, focusing on political sociology and sociological methodology. In 2009, Dudzińska defended her doctorate in sociology at the Polish Academy of Sciences. Her doctoral thesis was entitled Reprezentacja polityczna w Polsce na różnych szczeblach systemu władzy (Political representation in Poland at various levels of government). In 2019, Dudzińska became a professor in the Faculty of Applied Social Sciences and Prevention and the Institute of Social Prevention and Resocialization at the University of Warsaw.

In 2015, Dudzińska published the book System zamknięty. Socjologiczna analiza procesu legislacyjnego (Closed system: A sociological analysis of the legislative system).

== Politics and activism ==
Dudzińska has worked in a number of public service roles in Poland, both with non-governmental organizations and governmental programs. In 2013–2014, she was the deputy president for the Państwowym Funduszu Rehabilitacji Osób Niepełnosprawnych (pl), a state fund that promotes employment for disabled people in Poland. She chaired the protected housing commission Komisja Dialogu Społecznego do spraw Mieszkań Chronionych, as well as the Komisji Dialogu Społecznego ds. Niepełnosprawności, the Social Dialogue Commission for Disability in Warsaw. She was also involved in the child welfare organization Nie-Grzeczne Dzieci. Dudzińska has also been a subject matter expert consultant to the Polish Ombudsman and the Polish Ministry of National Education, and has been a researcher with the Disability Research Center.

Dudzińska was twice nominated for the position of Ombudsman for Children, which requires a majority vote in the Sejm and approval by the Senate of Poland. On September 20, 2018, she was nominated by the Law and Justice party for the position of the Ombudsman for Children. However, during the vote in the Sejm on October 4, 2018, she did not obtain the required majority of votes. On October 11, 2018, her candidacy was again put forward by Law and Justice. On October 23, 2018, she was elected by the Sejm for the position of the Ombudsman for Children's Rights. However, on October 26, 2018, the Senate did not approve the appointment.

In 2011 she was a nominee for the Stołek award of the Gazeta Wyborcza newspaper for her work on housing availability for disabled people, and she won a reader's award for her work on behalf of disabled students.

== Selected works ==
- System zamknięty. Socjologiczna analiza procesu legislacyjnego (2015)
