= Uraz, West Pomeranian Voivodeship =

Uraz
- Village
- Location within Poland
- Coordinates: 53°38′9″N 16°9′6″E
- Country: Poland
- Voivodeship: West Pomeranian
- County: Drawsko
- Gmina: Złocieniec

Population
  - Total: 10

Uraz [ˈuras] (German: Kalenberg) is a village in the administrative district of Gmina Złocieniec, within Drawsko County, West Pomeranian Voivodeship, in north-western Poland. It lies approximately 16 km (10 mi) north-east of Złocieniec, 26 km (16 mi) north-east of Drawsko Pomorskie, and 107 km (66 mi) east of the regional capital Szczecin.

Before 1772 the area was part of Kingdom of Poland, 1772-1945 Prussia and Germany. For more on its history, see Wałcz County and "Warlang-Heinrichsdorf Domain".

The village has a population of 10.
