= Lubieszewo, Drawsko County =

Lubieszewo
- Village
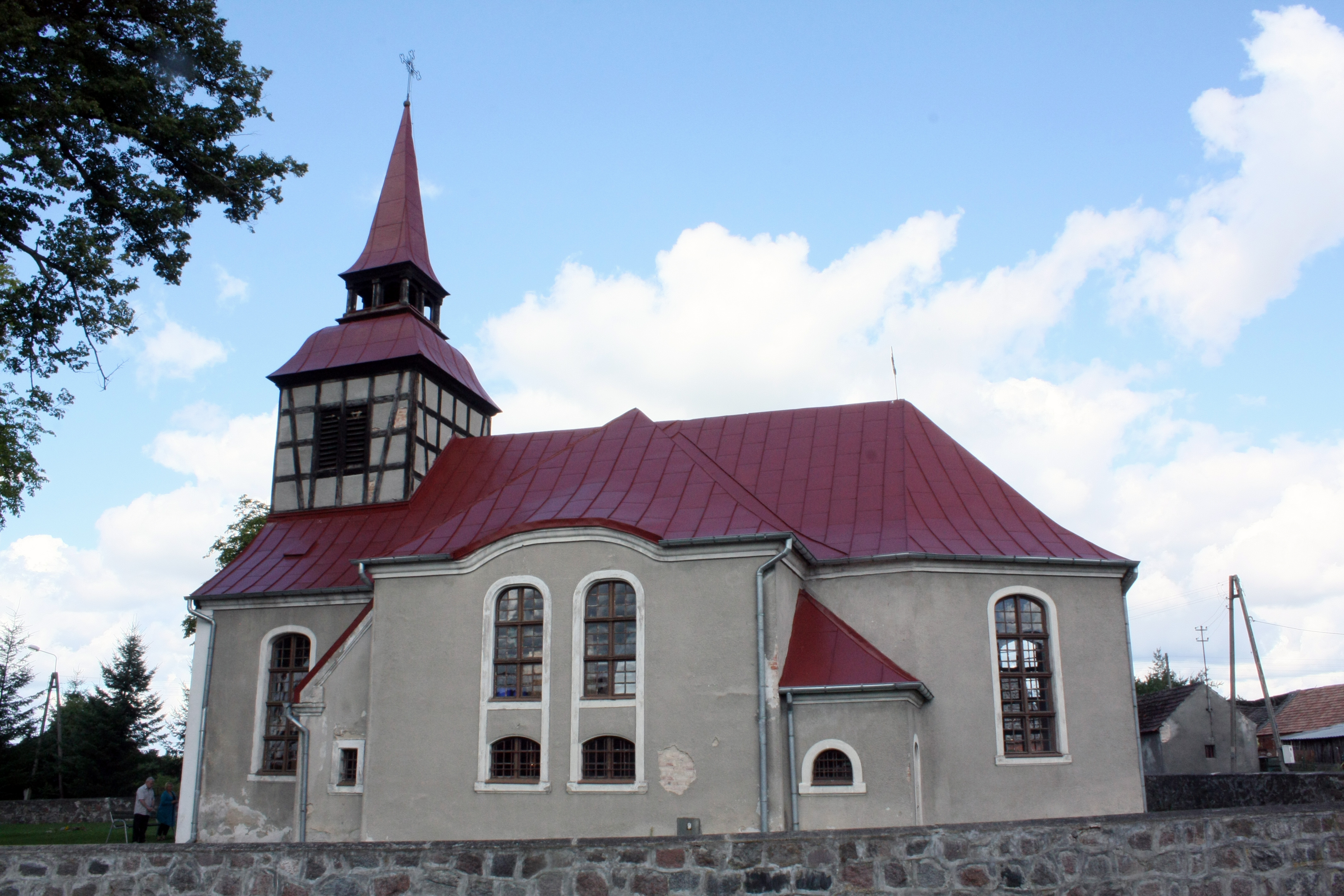
- Church of Saint Casimir

- Location within Poland
- Coordinates: 53°27′29″N 15°56′46″E
- Country: Poland
- Voivodeship: West Pomeranian
- County: Drawsko
- Gmina: Złocieniec

Population
  - Total: 340

Lubieszewo [lubjɛˈʂɛvɔ] (German: Güntershagen) is a village in the administrative district of Gmina Złocieniec, within Drawsko County, West Pomeranian Voivodeship, in north-western Poland.

For the history of the region, see History of Pomerania.
