= Rzęśnica, Drawsko County =

Rzęśnica
- Village
- Location within Poland
- Coordinates: 53°31′52″N 15°56′35″E
- Country: Poland
- Voivodeship: West Pomeranian
- County: Drawsko
- Gmina: Złocieniec

Rzęśnica [ʐɛ̃ɕˈnit͡sa] (formerly German Grünberg) is a village in the administrative district of Gmina Złocieniec, within Drawsko County, West Pomeranian Voivodeship, in north-western Poland. It lies approximately 5 km (3 mi) west of Złocieniec, 10 km (6 mi) east of Drawsko Pomorskie, and 91 km (57 mi) east of the regional capital Szczecin.

For the history of the region, see History of Pomerania.
