= Gmina Złocieniec =

Gmina Złocieniec Złocieniec Commune
- Gmina
- Flag Coat of arms
- Interactive map of Gmina Złocieniec
- Coordinates (Złocieniec): 53°31′37″N 16°0′44″E
- Country: Poland
- Voivodeship: West Pomeranian
- County: Drawsko
- Seat: Złocieniec

Area
  - Total: 194.53 km^{2} (75.11 sq mi)

Population (2006)
  - Total: 15,571
  - Density: 80.044/km^{2} (207.31/sq mi)
  - Urban: 13,377
  - Rural: 2,194
- Website: http://www.zlocieniec.pl/

Gmina Złocieniec is an urban-rural gmina (administrative district) in Drawsko County, West Pomeranian Voivodeship, in north-western Poland. Its seat is the town of Złocieniec, which lies approximately 15 kilometres (9 mi) east of Drawsko Pomorskie and 96 km (60 mi) east of the regional capital Szczecin.

The gmina covers an area of 194.53 square kilometres (75.1 sq mi), and as of 2006 its total population is 15,571 (out of which the population of Złocieniec amounts to 13,377, and the population of the rural part of the gmina is 2,194).

The gmina contains part of the protected area called Drawsko Landscape Park.

== Villages ==
Apart from the town of Złocieniec, Gmina Złocieniec contains the villages and settlements of Błędno, Bobrowo, Cieszyno, Darskowo, Jadwiżyn, Jarosław, Kosobudki, Kosobudy, Lubieszewo, Małobór, Męcidół, Rzęśnica, Skąpe, Stare Worowo, Stawno, Sułoszyn, Szymalów, Uraz, Warniłęg, Wąsosz and Zatonie.

== Neighbouring gminas ==
Gmina Złocieniec is bordered by the gminas of Czaplinek, Drawsko Pomorskie, Kalisz Pomorski, Ostrowice, Połczyn-Zdrój and Wierzchowo.
