= Warniłęg =

- Village
- Location within Poland
- Coordinates: 53°37′18″N 16°7′7″E
- Country: Poland
- Voivodeship: West Pomeranian
- County: Drawsko
- Gmina: Złocieniec
- Population: 240
- Time zone: UTC+1 (CET)
  - Summer (DST): UTC+2 (CEST)

Warniłęg [varˈniwɛnk] is a village in the administrative district of Gmina Złocieniec, within Drawsko County, West Pomeranian Voivodeship, in north-western Poland. It lies approximately 13 km (8 mi) north-east of Złocieniec, 24 km (15 mi) north-east of Drawsko Pomorskie, and 105 km (65 mi) east of the regional capital Szczecin.

Until the First Partition of Poland in 1772 the area was part of the Kingdom of Poland, in 1772–1871 it was in Prussia, and in 1871–1945 belonged to Germany. After World War II it was reintegrated with Poland. During the war the Germans established and operated a forced labour camp for prisoners of war of various nationalities in the village.
