= Złocieniec =

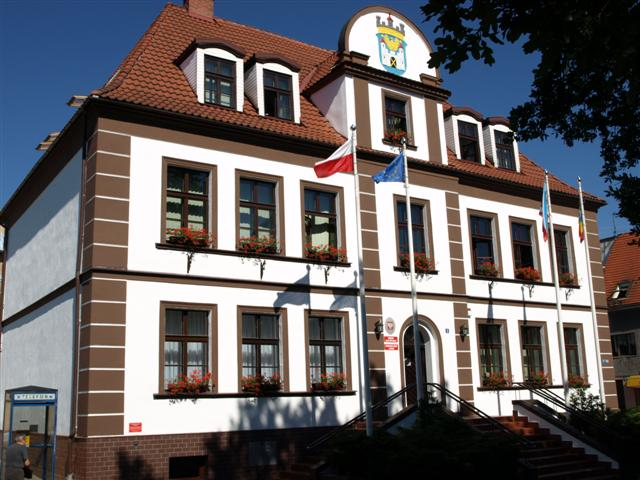
- Town hall

- Flag Coat of arms

- Location within Poland
- Coordinates: 53°31′37″N 16°0′44″E
- Country: Poland
- Voivodeship: West Pomeranian
- County: Drawsko
- Gmina: Złocieniec
- Town rights: 1333

Area
  - Total: 32.22 km^{2} (12.44 sq mi)

Population (2006)
  - Total: 13,377
  - Density: 415.2/km^{2} (1,075/sq mi)
- Time zone: UTC+1 (CET)
  - Summer (DST): UTC+2 (CEST)
- Postal code: 78-520
- Website: http://www.zlocieniec.pl

Złocieniec ([zwɔˈt͡ɕɛɲɛt͡s]; Kashubian: Walczembórg; German: Falkenburg) is a town in northwestern Poland. Located in West Pomeranian Voivodeship's Drawsko County since 1999, it was previously a part of Koszalin Voivodeship (1950–1998). The population of Złocieniec is around 12,000 - it is therefore the biggest town in the county (powiat).

== History ==
The official town webpage states that between the 7th and 6th century BC the area of the town was the site of a village and that the area of Western Pomerania was settled by Slavs in the 6th-8th centuries. The area was part of Poland during the reign of the first Polish rulers Mieszko I and Bolesław I the Brave. In the 13th century it was the northernmost area of the Duchy of Greater Poland, a province of fragmented Poland. When the town rights were granted it's highly probable that among German inhabitants of the town were also Slavs from Budów and Strzebłów-villages that were disbanded. Town rights were granted by the brothers von Wedel on 13 December 1333. From 1373 Złocieniec was one of the northernmost towns of the Lands of the Bohemian Crown (or Czech Lands), ruled by the Luxembourg dynasty. Bohemia itself was part of the Holy Roman Empire. In 1402, the Luxembourgs reached an agreement with Poland in Kraków. Poland was to buy and re-incorporate Złocieniec and its surroundings, but eventually the Luxembourgs sold the city to the Teutonic Order. During the Polish–Teutonic War (1431–35) Złocieniec rebelled against the Order to join Poland and recognized the Polish King as rightful ruler, but after the Peace of Brześć Kujawski, the town, after receiving a guarantee of impunity for siding with Poland, returned to the rule of the Teutonic Knights, although, as it turned out, for a short time - only until 1454.

In 1668 the town was almost completely destroyed by a fire. In the 18th century it became part of Prussia and subsequently it was part of Germany from 1871 to 1945. During the era of Nazi Germany the Ordensburg Krössinsee was built near the town in 1934. The SA attacked the Jewish population here during Kristallnacht, later, during the Second World War a forced labour camp was established near the town, from which 31 Poles managed to escape. During World War II, in view of the inevitable defeat of Nazi Germany, on March 2, 1945, the evacuation of people who were unable to fight was ordered. On March 5, the town was captured by the First Polish Army. After World War II the town was handed over to Poland by the Allies per the Potsdam Conference, with Poles being transferred from the East while remaining Germans were expelled to the west. On May 13, 1945 the first transport of Poles expelled from former Eastern Poland, annexed by the Soviet Union, arrived to Złocieniec from the Baranowicze region.

== Population statistics ==
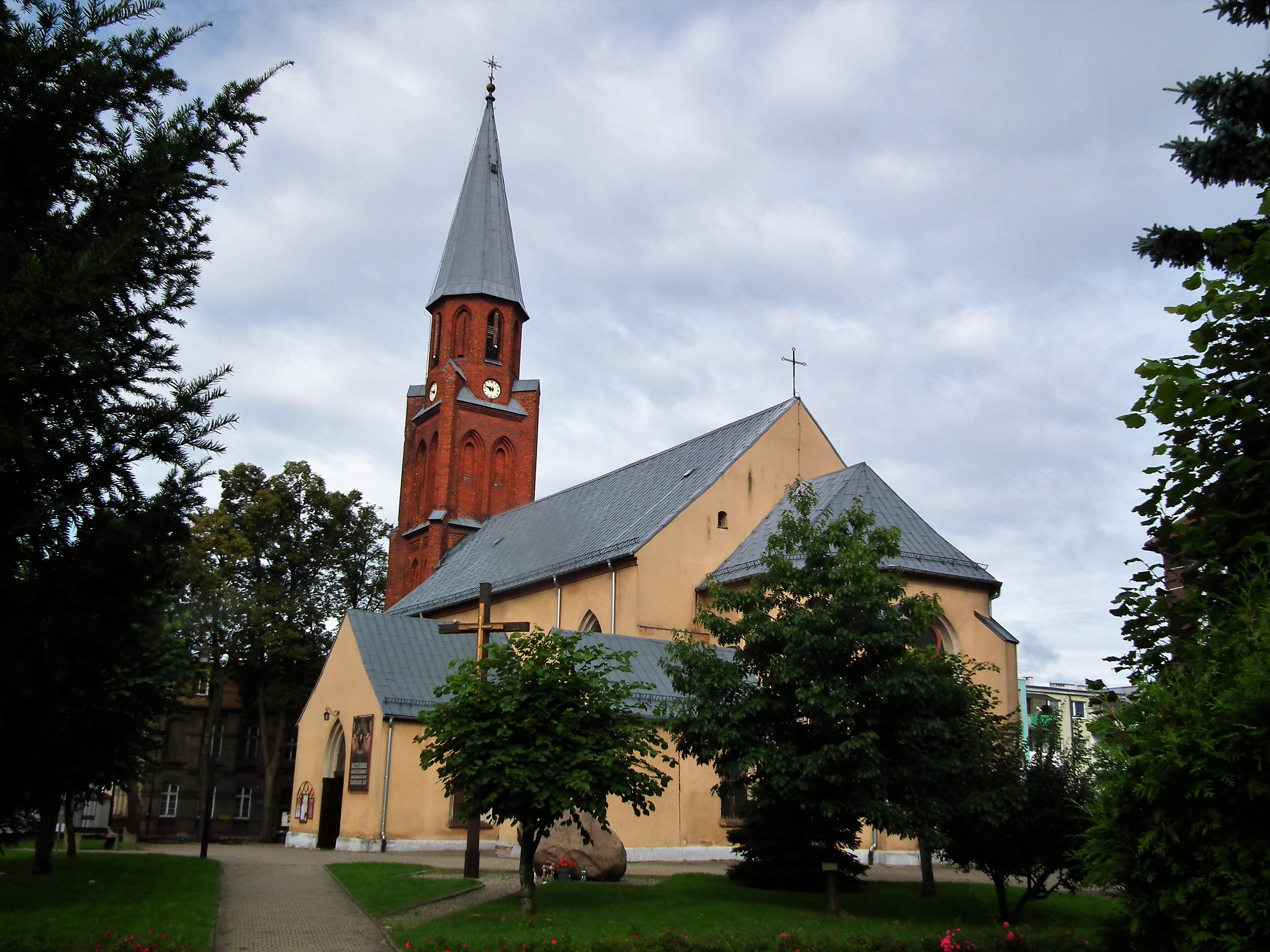
Church of the Assumption in Złocieniec

- 1666: 990
- 1880: 4,009
- 1925: 5,529
- 1939: 8,623
- 1950: 7,550
- 1960: 8,400
- 1970: 10,200
- 1975: 11,500
- 1980: 12,000
- 1990: 18,000
- 2000: 22,000
- 2005: 28,000

== International relations ==
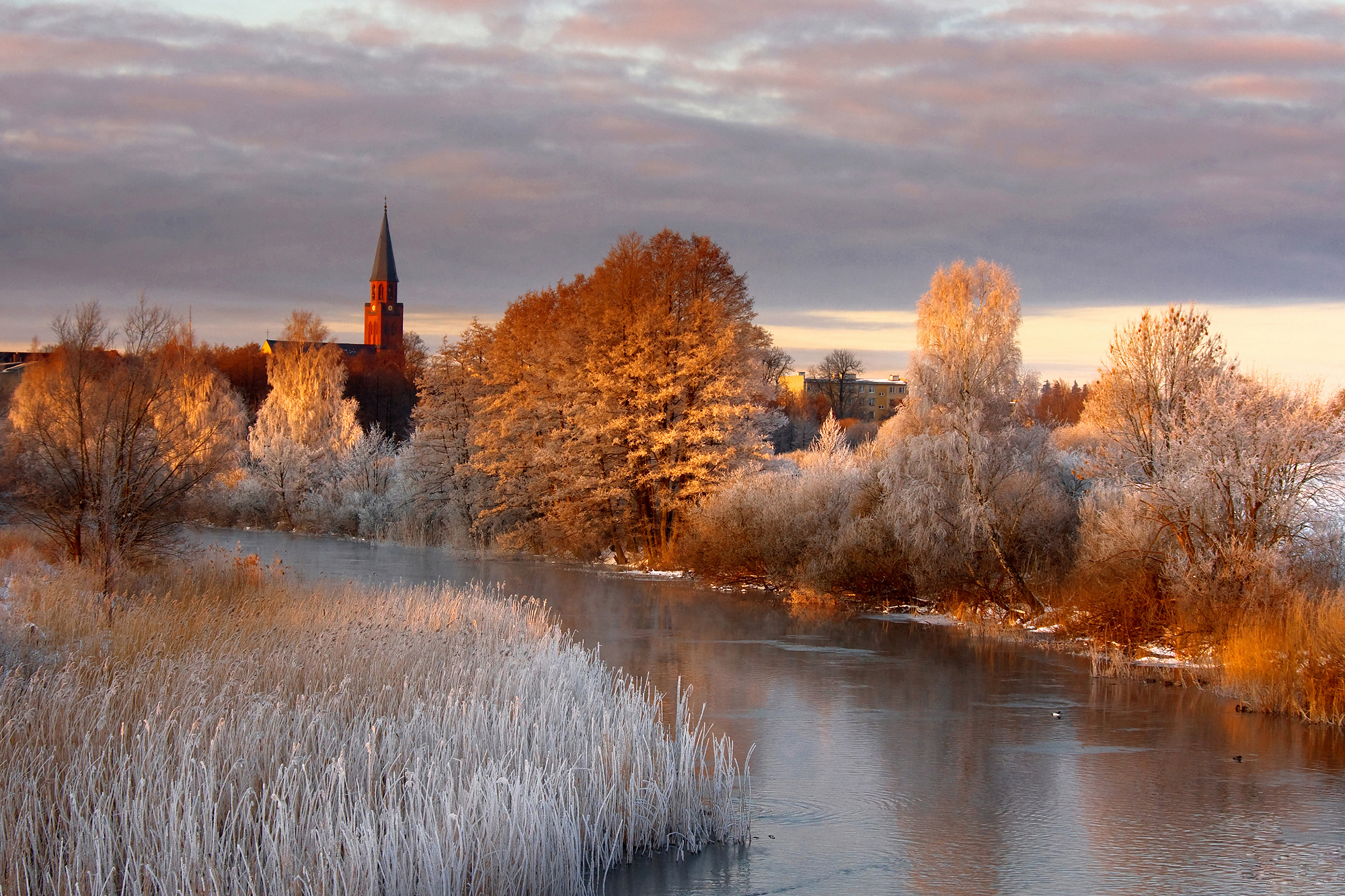
Złocieniec in winter

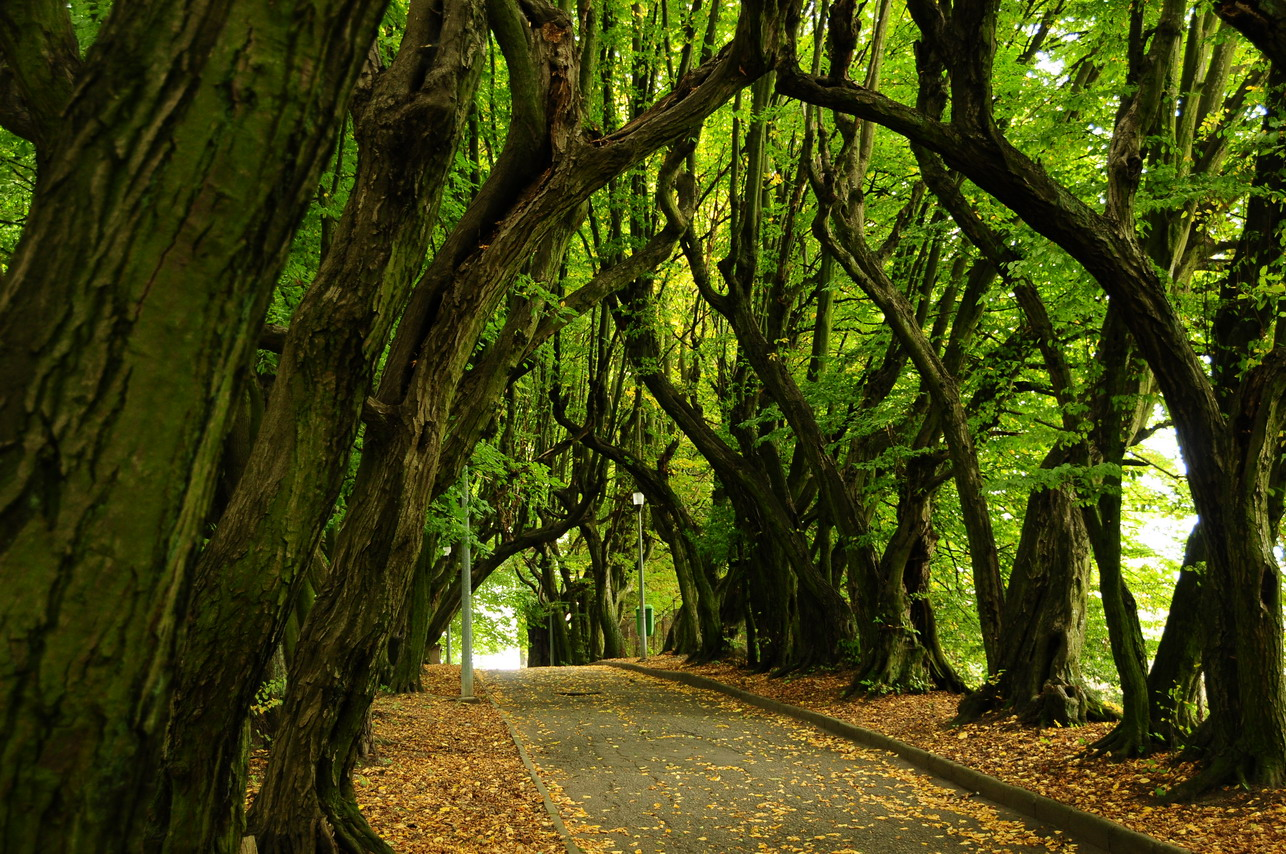
Park Żubra (Wisent Park)

Złocieniec is twinned with:

Bad Segeberg, Germany; Drawsko Pomorskie, Poland	Koserow, Germany; Pyrzyce, Poland

== Notable residents ==
- Caspar Brülow (1585–1627) scholar and dramatist
- Otto Neitzel (1852–1920) a composer and pianist, music writer, journalist and lecturer
- Ullrich Haupt (1887–1931), actor
- Rudolf Katz (1895–1961), German politician and judge
- Mariusz Rumak (born 1977), Polish football manager
- Krzysztof Myszkowski (born 1963), Polish musician, lead vocalist of Stare Dobre Małżeństwo
- Kazimierz Jodkowski, philosopher and professor
