= Pniewy (disambiguation) =

Pniewy is a town in Szamotuły County, Greater Poland Voivodeship (west-central Poland). It was formerly known as Pinne in German, when it was part of Prussia.

Pniewy may also refer to:

- Pniewy, Kuyavian-Pomeranian Voivodeship (north-central Poland)
- Pniewy, Masovian Voivodeship (east-central Poland)
- Pniewy, West Pomeranian Voivodeship (north-west Poland)
