= Karwiagać =

- Village
- Location within Poland
- Coordinates: 53°16′49″N 16°1′47″E
- Country: Poland
- Voivodeship: West Pomeranian
- County: Drawsko
- Gmina: Kalisz Pomorski

Karwiagać [karˈvjaɡat͡ɕ] (German: Kranzwerder) is a village in the administrative district of Gmina Kalisz Pomorski, within Drawsko County, West Pomeranian Voivodeship, in north-western Poland. It lies approximately 9 km (6 mi) east of Kalisz Pomorski, 32 km (20 mi) south-east of Drawsko Pomorskie, and 98 km (61 mi) east of the regional capital Szczecin.

For the history of the region, see History of Pomerania.
