= Suchowo, West Pomeranian Voivodeship =

Suchowo
- Village
- Location within Poland
- Coordinates: 53°19′N 15°49′E
- Country: Poland
- Voivodeship: West Pomeranian
- County: Drawsko
- Gmina: Kalisz Pomorski

Suchowo [suˈxɔvɔ] (German: Zuchow) is a village in the administrative district of Gmina Kalisz Pomorski, within Drawsko County, West Pomeranian Voivodeship, in north-western Poland. It lies approximately 7 km (4 mi) north-west of Kalisz Pomorski, 25 km (16 mi) south of Drawsko Pomorskie, and 83 km (52 mi) east of the regional capital Szczecin.

For the history of the region, see History of Pomerania.
