= Wet Lake =

Wet Lake may refer to two lakes in Poland:

- Wet Lake (Warmia-Masuria Voivodeship)
- Wet Lake (Kuyavia-Pomerania Voivodeship)
