= Dębsko, West Pomeranian Voivodeship =

Dębsko
- Village
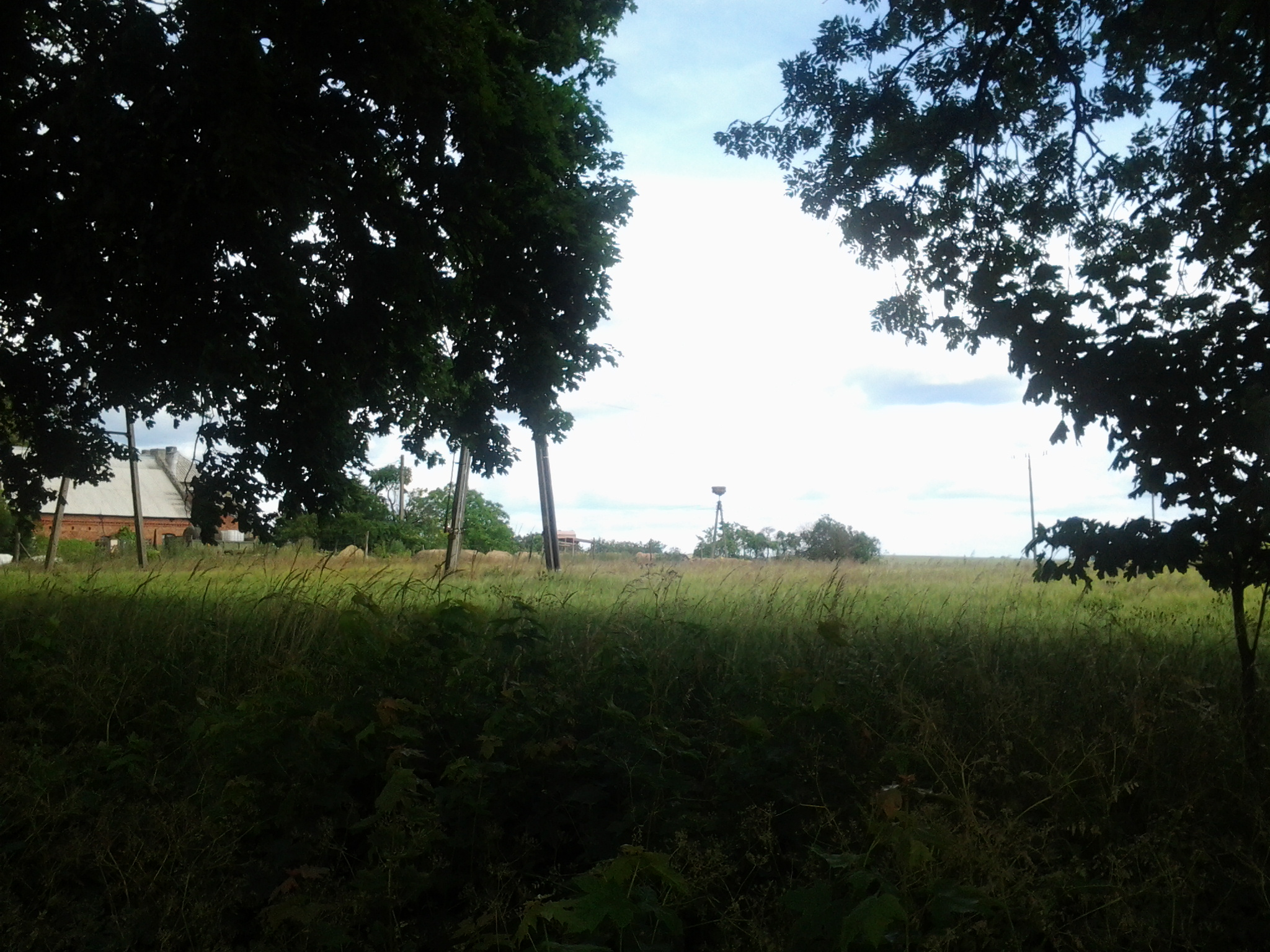

- Location within Poland
- Coordinates: 53°15′31″N 15°51′14″E
- Country: Poland
- Voivodeship: West Pomeranian
- County: Drawsko
- Gmina: Kalisz Pomorski
- Time zone: UTC+1 (CET)
  - Summer (DST): UTC+2 (CEST)

Dębsko [ˈdɛmpskɔ] (German: Denzig) is a village in the administrative district of Gmina Kalisz Pomorski, within Drawsko County, West Pomeranian Voivodeship, in north-western Poland. It lies approximately 5 km (3 mi) south-west of Kalisz Pomorski, 31 km (19 mi) south of Drawsko Pomorskie, and 87 km (54 mi) east of the regional capital Szczecin.

== History ==
The territory became part of the emerging Polish state under its first ruler Mieszko I around 967. In different periods in the Middle Ages it was a part of Pomerania or Greater Poland.

In 1326, the village was destroyed by Polish-Lithuanian troops. In 1337, according to the land register it was in the possession of the Bruthow family. From 1373 Drawno was part of the Lands of the Bohemian Crown (or Czech Lands), ruled by the Luxembourg dynasty. In 1402, the Luxembourgs reached an agreement with Poland in Kraków. Poland was to buy and re-incorporate the territory, but eventually the Luxembourgs sold the city to the Teutonic Order. According to damage records, it suffered greatly again in 1443 at the hands of Polish troops, and in 1467 it was plundered by passing mercenaries. In 1507, John, Margrave of Brandenburg-Küstrin confirmed ownership by the Wedel. The half-timbered church was built in 1577. In 1658, Denzig belonged to Colonel Georn von Beneckendorf as a fief. In 1778, Johann Ernst Gottlieb von Wedell acquired the village, and later the Romberg were owners. In 1896 a train station Denzig was built train station on the Arnswalde-Kallies line (today: Grzmiąca–Kostrzyn-line).
