= Pepłówek, West Pomeranian Voivodeship =

Pepłówek
- Village
- Location within Poland
- Coordinates: 53°23′N 15°55′E
- Country: Poland
- Voivodeship: West Pomeranian
- County: Drawsko
- Gmina: Kalisz Pomorski

Pepłówek [pɛˈpwuvɛk] (German: Neufeld) is a village in the administrative district of Gmina Kalisz Pomorski, within Drawsko County, West Pomeranian Voivodeship, in north-western Poland. It lies approximately 12 km (7 mi) north of Kalisz Pomorski, 19 km (12 mi) south-east of Drawsko Pomorskie, and 89 km (55 mi) east of the regional capital Szczecin.

For the history of the region, see History of Pomerania.
