= Poźrzadło Wielkie =

- Village
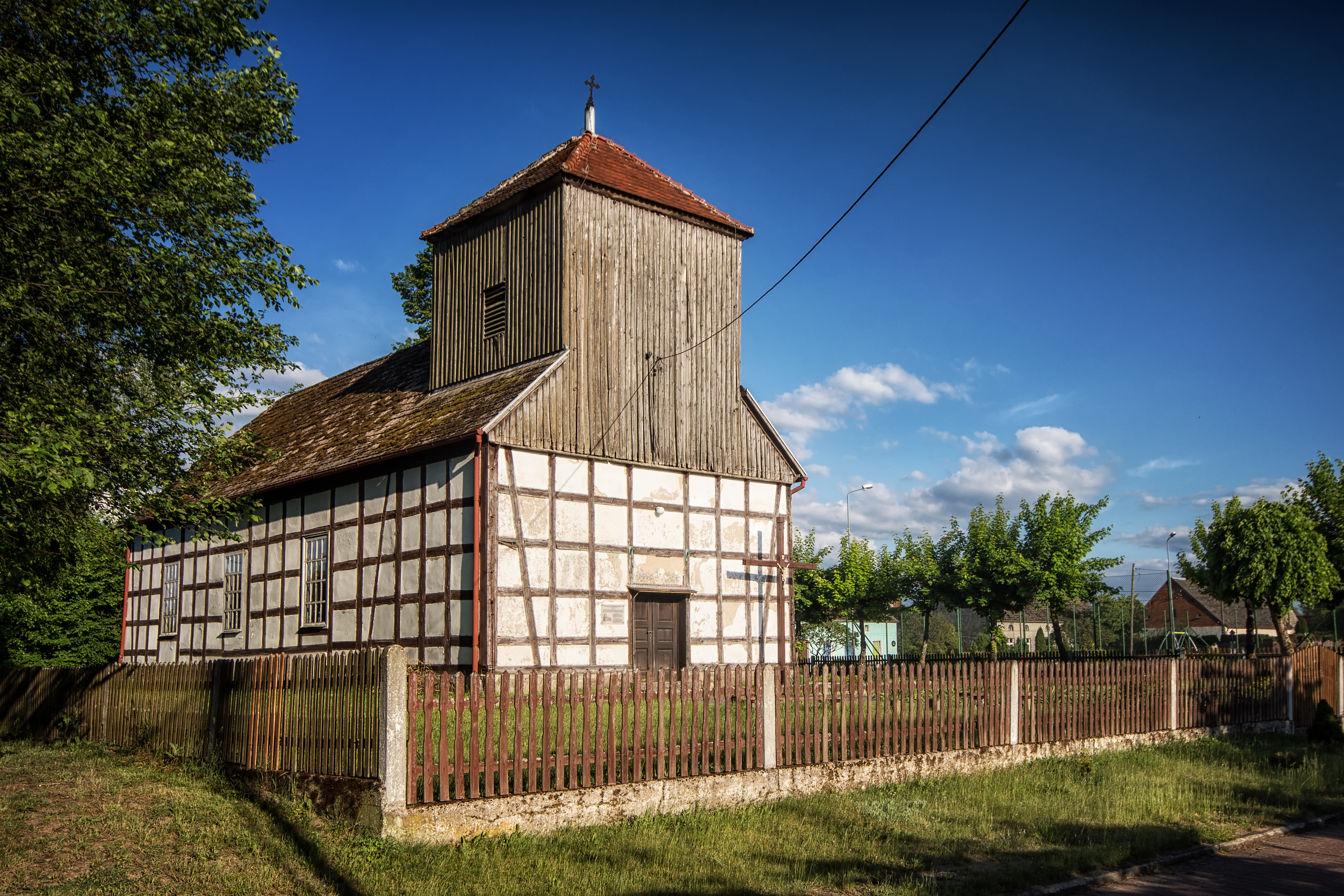
- Church of St. Stanisław

- Location within Poland
- Coordinates: 53°22′N 15°53′E
- Country: Poland
- Voivodeship: West Pomeranian
- County: Drawsko
- Gmina: Kalisz Pomorski

Poźrzadło Wielkie [pɔˈʑʐadwɔ ˈvjɛlkʲɛ] (German: Groß Spiegel) is a village in the administrative district of Gmina Kalisz Pomorski, within Drawsko County, West Pomeranian Voivodeship, in north-western Poland. It lies approximately 10 km (6 mi) north of Kalisz Pomorski, 20 km (12 mi) south of Drawsko Pomorskie, and 87 km (54 mi) east of the regional capital Szczecin.

For the history of the region, see History of Pomerania.
