= Stara Korytnica =

- Village
- Location within Poland
- Coordinates: 53°18′N 16°2′E
- Country: Poland
- Voivodeship: West Pomeranian
- County: Drawsko
- Gmina: Kalisz Pomorski

Stara Korytnica [ˈstara kɔrɨtˈnit͡sa] (German: Alt Körtnitz) is a village in the administrative district of Gmina Kalisz Pomorski, within Drawsko County, West Pomeranian Voivodeship, in north-western Poland. It lies approximately 10 km (6 mi) east of Kalisz Pomorski, 31 km (19 mi) south-east of Drawsko Pomorskie, and 98 km (61 mi) east of the regional capital Szczecin.

== History ==
The village was founded before 1300 and was endowed with German law around 1300. The village was plundered by Polish-Lithuanian troops in 1326, destroyed by Poles in 1434. The railway line Kallies-Falkenburg waa built through the village. The village had it own Lutheran parish, while Catholics belonged to the parish of Arnswalde. A new school building was erected in 1936/37. For more on the history of the region, see History of Pomerania.
