= Poźrzadło Małe =

- Village
- Location within Poland
- Coordinates: 53°20′3″N 15°37′30″E
- Country: Poland
- Voivodeship: West Pomeranian
- County: Drawsko
- Gmina: Kalisz Pomorski
- Population: 0

Poźrzadło Małe [pɔˈʑʐadwɔ ˈmawɛ] (German: Klein Spiegel) is a former village in the administrative district of Gmina Kalisz Pomorski, within Drawsko County, West Pomeranian Voivodeship, in north-western Poland. It lies approximately 20 km (12 mi) west of Kalisz Pomorski, 25 km (16 mi) south-west of Drawsko Pomorskie, and 70 km (43 mi) east of the regional capital Szczecin.

For the history of the region, see History of Pomerania.
