= Jaworze, West Pomeranian Voivodeship =

Jaworze
- Village
- Location within Poland
- Coordinates: 53°18′59″N 15°41′31″E
- Country: Poland
- Voivodeship: West Pomeranian
- County: Drawsko
- Gmina: Kalisz Pomorski
- Population: 10

Jaworze [jaˈvɔʐɛ] (German: Gabbert) is a village in the administrative district of Gmina Kalisz Pomorski, within Drawsko County, West Pomeranian Voivodeship, in north-western Poland. It lies approximately 15 km (9 mi) west of Kalisz Pomorski, 26 km (16 mi) south of Drawsko Pomorskie, and 75 km (47 mi) east of the regional capital Szczecin.

For the history of the region, see History of Pomerania.

The village has a population of 10.
