= Giżyno, West Pomeranian Voivodeship =

Giżyno
- Village
- Location within Poland
- Coordinates: 53°20′N 15°56′E
- Country: Poland
- Voivodeship: West Pomeranian
- County: Drawsko
- Gmina: Kalisz Pomorski

Giżyno [ɡiˈʐɨnɔ] (German: Glesen) is a village in the administrative district of Gmina Kalisz Pomorski, within Drawsko County, West Pomeranian Voivodeship, in north-western Poland. It lies approximately 6 km (4 mi) north of Kalisz Pomorski, 24 km (15 mi) south of Drawsko Pomorskie, and 91 km (57 mi) east of the regional capital Szczecin.

For the history of the region, see History of Pomerania.
