= Sienica, West Pomeranian Voivodeship =

Sienica
- Village
- Location within Poland
- Coordinates: 53°24′N 15°58′E
- Country: Poland
- Voivodeship: West Pomeranian
- County: Drawsko
- Gmina: Kalisz Pomorski

Sienica [ɕɛˈnit͡sa] (German: Jakobsdorf) is a village in the administrative district of Gmina Kalisz Pomorski, within Drawsko County, West Pomeranian Voivodeship, in north-western Poland. It lies approximately 14 km (9 mi) north of Kalisz Pomorski, 19 km (12 mi) south-east of Drawsko Pomorskie, and 92 km (57 mi) east of the regional capital Szczecin.

For the history of the region, see History of Pomerania.
