= Stara Studnica =

- Village
- Location within Poland
- Coordinates: 53°23′N 15°57′E
- Country: Poland
- Voivodeship: West Pomeranian
- County: Drawsko
- Gmina: Kalisz Pomorski

Stara Studnica [ˈstara studˈnit͡sa] (German: Alt Stüdnitz) is a village in the administrative district of Gmina Kalisz Pomorski, within Drawsko County, West Pomeranian Voivodeship, in north-western Poland. It lies approximately 12 km (7 mi) north of Kalisz Pomorski, 20 km (12 mi) south-east of Drawsko Pomorskie, and 91 km (57 mi) east of the regional capital Szczecin.

== History ==
The village was founded before 1300. The village was plundered by Polish-Lithuanian troops in 1326, In 1337 the village belong to the von Bruthow, 1499 it is mentioned as property of the von Brocken. In 1657, Polish troops steal corn. The timber-framed church probably dates from 1656. At parcelling of the land estate, the nearby settlement Neufels was founded. For more on the history of the region, see History of Pomerania.
