= Biały Zdrój, Drawsko County =

Biały Zdrój
- Village
- Location within Poland
- Coordinates: 53°15′52″N 15°57′31″E
- Country: Poland
- Voivodeship: West Pomeranian
- County: Drawsko
- Gmina: Kalisz Pomorski

Biały Zdrój [ˈbjawɨ ˈzdrui̯] (German: Balster) is a village in the administrative district of Gmina Kalisz Pomorski, within Drawsko County, West Pomeranian Voivodeship, in north-western Poland. It lies approximately 5 km (3 mi) south-east of Kalisz Pomorski, 32 km (20 mi) south of Drawsko Pomorskie, and 93 km (58 mi) east of the regional capital Szczecin.

== History ==
As the result of Polish invasions in the Neumark 1326 and 1434, the village was destroyed. Enemy troops also passed during the Thirty Year War and during the Northern War of 1655–1660. The church was built 1825/26 according to plans by Karl Friedrich Schinkel. In 1900, the train station Balster-Süd was built.

For the history of the region, see History of Pomerania.
