= Smugi, Drawsko County =

Smugi
- Settlement
- Location within Poland
- Coordinates: 53°19′0″N 15°55′29″E
- Country: Poland
- Voivodeship: West Pomeranian
- County: Drawsko
- Gmina: Kalisz Pomorski

Smugi [ˈsmuɡi] (German: Thalhof) is a settlement in the administrative district of Gmina Kalisz Pomorski, within Drawsko County, West Pomeranian Voivodeship, in north-western Poland. It lies approximately 5 km (3 mi) north-east of Kalisz Pomorski, 26 km (16 mi) south of Drawsko Pomorskie, and 90 km (56 mi) east of the regional capital Szczecin.

For the history of the region, see History of Pomerania.
