= Siekiercze =

- Settlement
- Location within Poland
- Coordinates: 53°19′19″N 15°55′53″E
- Country: Poland
- Voivodeship: West Pomeranian
- County: Drawsko
- Gmina: Kalisz Pomorski

Siekiercze [ɕɛˈkʲɛrt͡ʂɛ] (German: Kattenwerder) is a settlement in the administrative district of Gmina Kalisz Pomorski, within Drawsko County, West Pomeranian Voivodeship, in north-western Poland. It lies approximately 5 km (3 mi) north-east of Kalisz Pomorski, 26 km (16 mi) south of Drawsko Pomorskie, and 91 km (57 mi) east of the regional capital Szczecin. The Siekierczyn municipality has 4,470 residents, of which 49.8% are women and 50.2% are men. Between 2002 and 2021, the number of residents decreased by 1.1%. The average age of residents is 41.3, which is slightly lower than the average age of residents of the Lower Silesia province and comparable to the average age of residents of Poland as a whole.

For the history of the region, see History of Pomerania.
