= Pruszcz =

Pruszcz may refer to the following places:

- Pruszcz, Świecie County in Kuyavian-Pomeranian Voivodeship (north-central Poland)
- Pruszcz, Tuchola County in Kuyavian-Pomeranian Voivodeship (north-central Poland)
- Pruszcz Gdański in Pomeranian Voivodeship (north Poland)
- Pruszcz, Drawsko County in West Pomeranian Voivodeship (north-west Poland)
- Pruszcz, Gryfice County in West Pomeranian Voivodeship (north-west Poland)
