= Bralin, West Pomeranian Voivodeship =

Bralin
- Village
- Location within Poland
- Coordinates: 53°16′N 16°0′E
- Country: Poland
- Voivodeship: West Pomeranian
- County: Drawsko
- Gmina: Kalisz Pomorski
- Population: 180

Bralin [ˈbralin] (German: Adolfsruh) is a village in the administrative district of Gmina Kalisz Pomorski, within Drawsko County, West Pomeranian Voivodeship, in north-western Poland. It lies approximately 7 km (4 mi) east of Kalisz Pomorski, 33 km (21 mi) south-east of Drawsko Pomorskie, and 96 km (60 mi) east of the regional capital Szczecin.

For the history of the region, see History of Pomerania.

The village has a population of 180.
