= Oćwieka =

Oćwieka may refer to:

- Oćwieka, Kuyavian-Pomeranian Voivodeship, a village in the Gmina Gąsawa, Żnin County, Kuyavian-Pomeranian Voivodeship, Poland
- Oćwieka, West Pomeranian Voivodeship, a settlement in the Gmina Przelewice, Pyrzyce County, West Pomeranian Voivodeship, Poland
