= Ślizno =

- Village
- Location within Poland
- Coordinates: 53°20′11″N 15°51′57″E
- Country: Poland
- Voivodeship: West Pomeranian
- County: Drawsko
- Gmina: Kalisz Pomorski
- Population: 80

Ślizno [ˈɕliznɔ] (German: Julienhof) is a village in the administrative district of Gmina Kalisz Pomorski, within Drawsko County, West Pomeranian Voivodeship, in north-western Poland. It lies approximately 7 km (4 mi) north of Kalisz Pomorski, 23 km (14 mi) south of Drawsko Pomorskie, and 86 km (53 mi) east of the regional capital Szczecin.

For the history of the region, see History of Pomerania.

The village has a population of 80.
