= Głębokie, Drawsko County =

Głębokie
- Village
- Location within Poland
- Coordinates: 53°18′33″N 15°38′9″E
- Country: Poland
- Voivodeship: West Pomeranian
- County: Drawsko
- Gmina: Kalisz Pomorski
- Population: 40

Głębokie [ɡwɛmˈbɔkʲɛ] (German: Glambeck) is a village in the administrative district of Gmina Kalisz Pomorski, within Drawsko County, West Pomeranian Voivodeship, in north-western Poland. It lies approximately 18 km (11 mi) west of Kalisz Pomorski, 28 km (17 mi) south-west of Drawsko Pomorskie, and 71 km (44 mi) east of the regional capital Szczecin.

For the history of the region, see History of Pomerania.

The village has a population of 40.
