= Borowo, West Pomeranian Voivodeship =

Borowo
- Village
- Location within Poland
- Coordinates: 53°20′43″N 15°46′53″E
- Country: Poland
- Voivodeship: West Pomeranian
- County: Drawsko
- Gmina: Kalisz Pomorski
- Population: 50

Borowo [bɔˈrɔvɔ] (German: Alt Springe) is a village in the administrative district of Gmina Kalisz Pomorski, within Drawsko County, West Pomeranian Voivodeship, in north-western Poland. It lies approximately 11 km (7 mi) north-west of Kalisz Pomorski, 21 km (13 mi) south of Drawsko Pomorskie, and 80 km (50 mi) east of the regional capital Szczecin.

For the history of the region, see History of Pomerania.

The village has a population of 50.
