= Wierzchucin, West Pomeranian Voivodeship =

Wierzchucin
- Settlement
- Location within Poland
- Coordinates: 53°21′15″N 15°55′59″E
- Country: Poland
- Voivodeship: West Pomeranian
- County: Drawsko
- Gmina: Kalisz Pomorski

Wierzchucin [vjɛʂˈxut͡ɕin] (German: Christiansberg) is a settlement in the administrative district of Gmina Kalisz Pomorski, within Drawsko County, West Pomeranian Voivodeship, in north-western Poland. It lies approximately 9 km (6 mi) north of Kalisz Pomorski, 22 km (14 mi) south-east of Drawsko Pomorskie, and 90 km (56 mi) east of the regional capital Szczecin.

For the history of the region, see History of Pomerania.
