= Gąsawa =

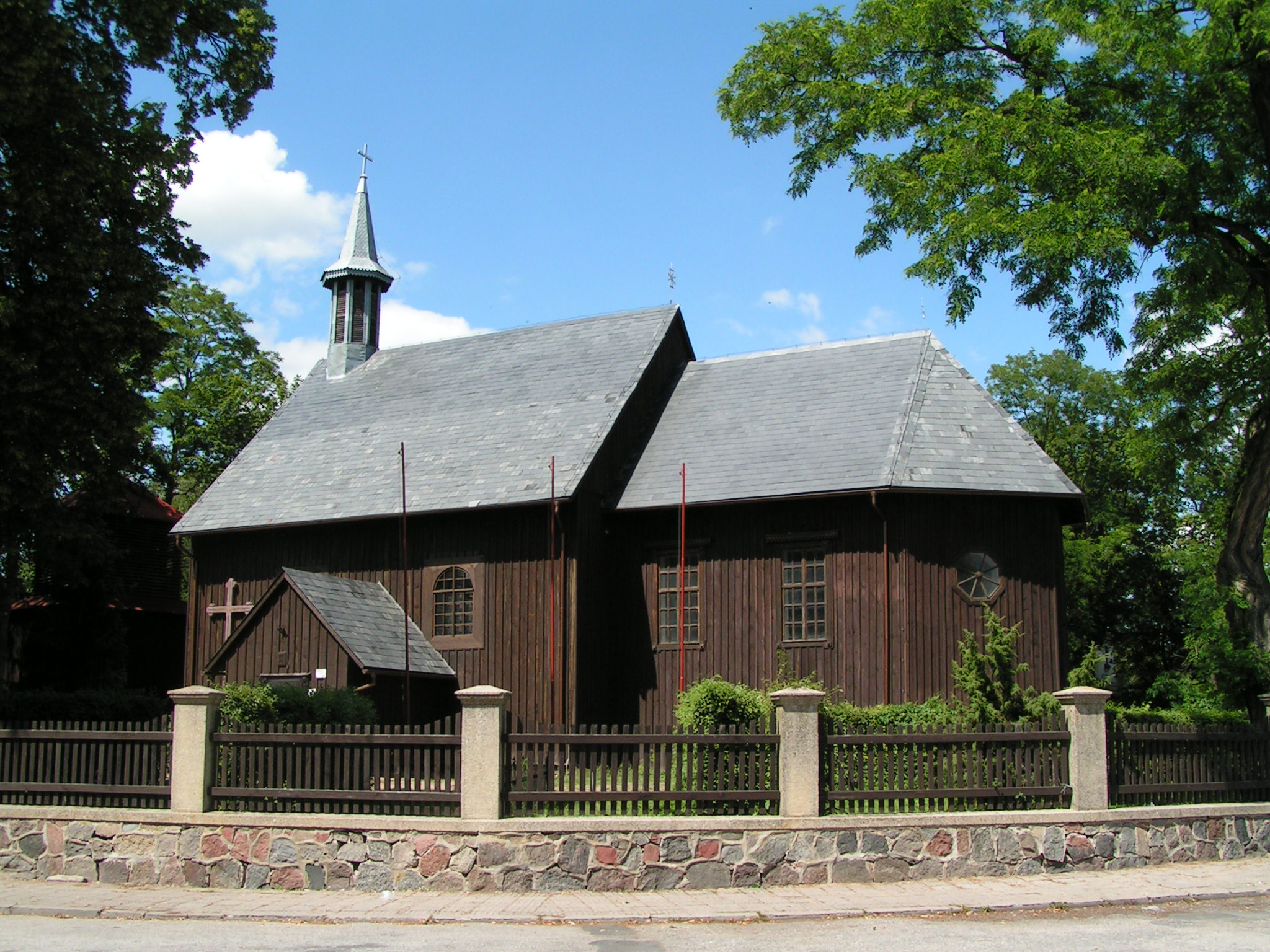
- Saint Nicholas Church

- Flag Coat of arms

- Location within Poland
- Coordinates: 52°46′N 17°45′E
- Country: Poland
- Voivodeship: Kuyavian-Pomeranian
- County: Żnin
- Gmina: Gąsawa
- First mentioned: 1136
- Town rights: 1338
- Town rights revoked: 13 June 1934
- Town rights restored: 1 January 2024

Population
  - Total: 1,400
- Time zone: UTC+1 (CET)
  - Summer (DST): UTC+2 (CEST)
- Vehicle registration: CZN
- Website: http://www.gasawa.pl/

Gąsawa [ɡɔ̃ˈsava] is a town in Żnin County, Kuyavian-Pomeranian Voivodeship, in north-central Poland. It is the seat of the gmina (administrative district) called Gmina Gąsawa. It is situated on the western shore of the Gąsawskie Lake in the region of Pałuki.

== History ==
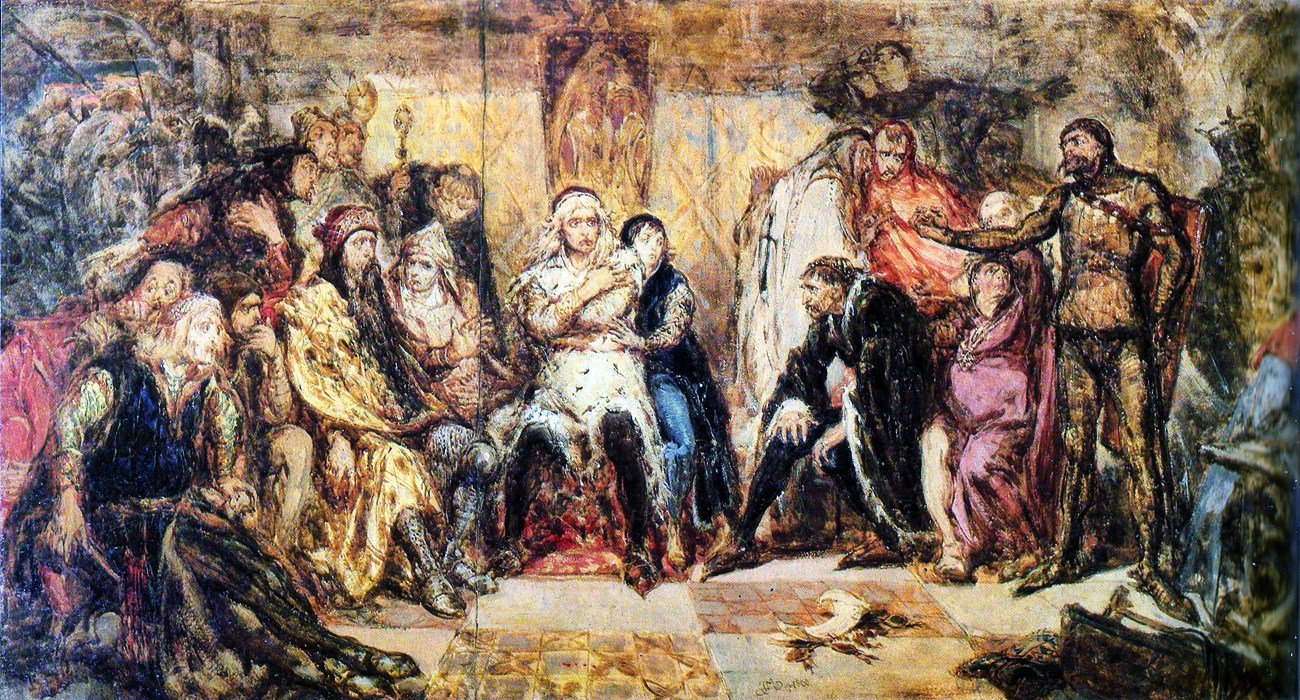
The Gąsawa Congress, 19th-century painting by Jan Matejko

The oldest known mention of the village comes from the Bull of Gniezno from 1136, when it was part of Piast-ruled Poland. It is famous as the place of the assassination of Leszek I the White, High Duke of Poland (November 23, 1227). Gąsawa received town rights in 1388 from King Władysław II Jagiełło and lost them in 1934. The town name appears as "Gonzawa", "Gonsawa", or "Gassawa" in certain older documents. It was a private church town, administratively located in the Gniezno County in the Kalisz Voivodeship in the Greater Poland Province of the Kingdom of Poland. In 1600 Gąsawa hosted the Lubrański Academy (Polish: Kolegium Lubrańskiego) which temporarily moved out of plague-stricken Poznań.

In the late 18th-century Partitions of Poland it was annexed by Prussia. After the successful Greater Poland uprising of 1806, it was regained by Poles and included within the short-lived Duchy of Warsaw. Following the duchy's dissolution in 1815, it was reannexed by Prussia, and from 1871 it also formed part of Germany. Following World War I, in 1918, Poland regained independence and the Greater Poland uprising against Germany broke out, during which the Poles regained control of Gąsawa.

Following the joint German-Soviet invasion of Poland, which started World War II in September 1939, it was occupied by Germany until 1945. The Germans renamed it to Gerlingen to erase traces of Polish origin. In 1940, the occupiers carried out expulsions of Poles, particularly owners of larger farms, which were then handed over to German colonists as part of the Lebensraum policy, while the Poles were deported to the General Government in the more eastern part of German-occupied Poland.

== Sights ==
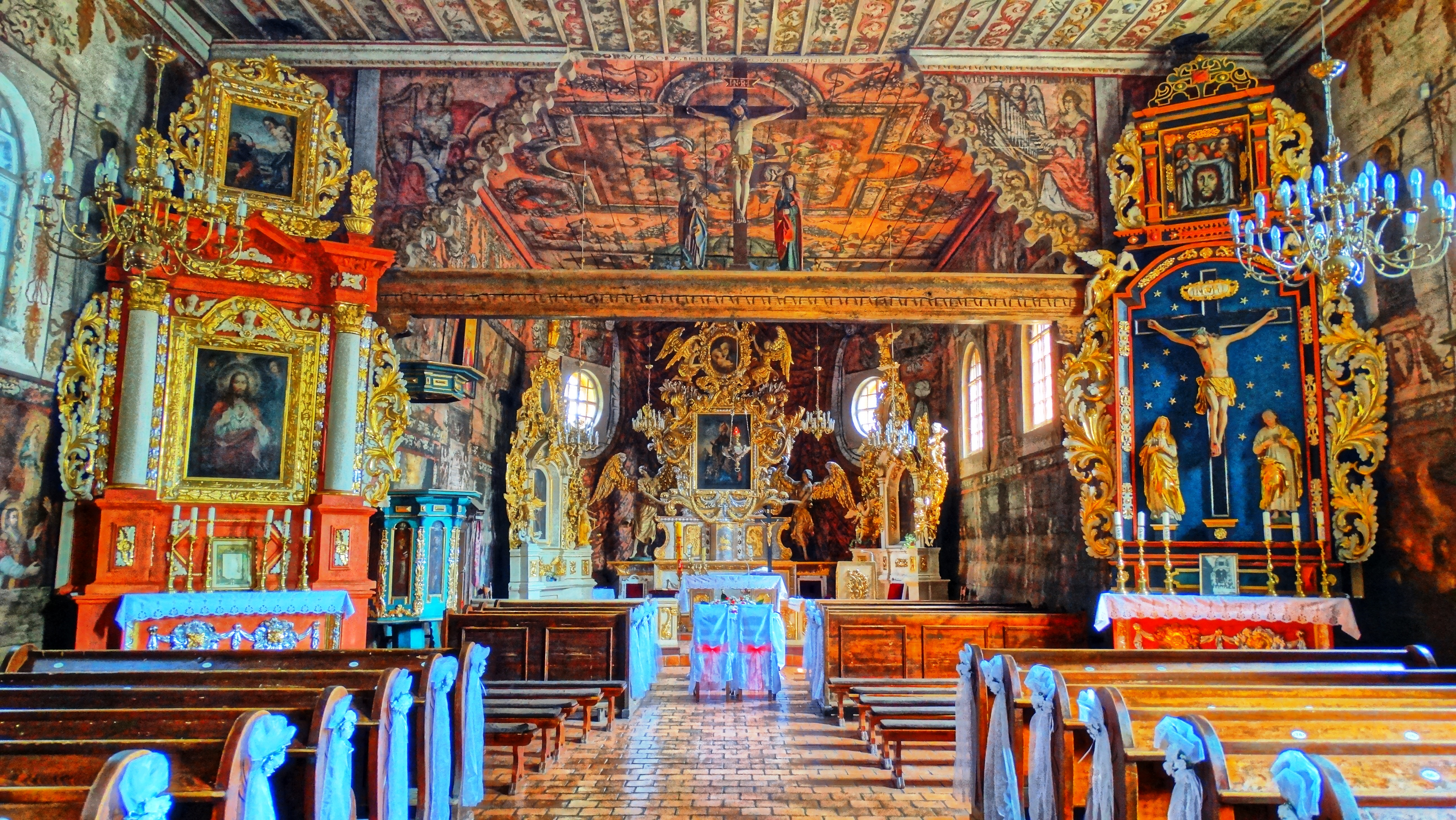
Interior of the Saint Nicholas Church

The main tourist attraction in Gąsawa is the 17th century wooden St. Nicolas Church with a unique collection of multi-layered mural paintings, the earliest from the 17th century, and the most recent from 1807.

The church itself, a larch construction with a slate roof, was in such a bad state around 1850 that local officials asked the regional Prussian government to allow the church to be dismantled and build a new one instead. The response gave permission to only overhaul the building. Existing wall paintings were covered with a layer of reed and ordinary plaster, and forgotten for some 150 years.

At the local parish cemetery there are graves of fallen Polish insurgents of the Greater Poland uprising (1918–1919).
