= Skotniki =

Skotniki may refer to the following places in Poland:

- Skotniki, part of the Dębniki district of Kraków
- Skotniki, Greater Poland Voivodeship (west-central Poland)
- Skotniki, Kuyavian-Pomeranian Voivodeship (north-central Poland)
- Skotniki, Piotrków County in Łódź Voivodeship (central Poland)
- Skotniki, Poddębice County in Łódź Voivodeship (central Poland)
- Skotniki, Gmina Ozorków in Łódź Voivodeship (central Poland)
- Skotniki, Gmina Zgierz in Łódź Voivodeship (central Poland)
- Skotniki, Lower Silesian Voivodeship (south-west Poland)
- Skotniki, Masovian Voivodeship (east-central Poland)
- Skotniki, Świętokrzyskie Voivodeship (south-central Poland)
- Skotniki, Drawsko County in West Pomeranian Voivodeship (north-west Poland)
- Skotniki, Gryfino County in West Pomeranian Voivodeship (north-west Poland)
- Skotniki, Szczecinek County in West Pomeranian Voivodeship (north-west Poland)
