= Battle of Pruszcz Gdański =

- Part of the Thirteen Years' War
Date	August 1460
Location	Near Pruszcz Gdański, Poland 54°16′N 18°38′E
Result	Teutonic victory

Belligerents
Teutonic Order	Polish Crown; Prussian Confederation

Commanders and leaders
Bernard Szumborski; Fritz Raweltek	Unknown

The Battle of Pruszcz Gdański took place near Pruszcz Gdański (Praust) in late August 1460, during the Thirteen Years' War. A detachment of the Teutonic Knights, sent from Chojnice (Konitz), clashed with forces of the city of Gdańsk (Danzig), which supported Polish King Kazimierz Jagiellończyk. The Gdańsk troops, taken by surprise by better trained Knights, were defeated. The city itself was not captured, but after this success, the Knights began a campaign in Pomerelia, capturing such towns, as Lębork (Lauenburg), Bytów (Butow), Świecie (Schwetz), Łeba and Puck (Putzig).
