= Laski Małe, Kuyavian-Pomeranian Voivodeship =

Laski Małe
- Village
- Location within Poland
- Coordinates: 52°47′N 17°51′E
- Country: Poland
- Voivodeship: Kuyavian-Pomeranian
- County: Żnin
- Gmina: Gąsawa

Laski Małe (Polish pronunciation: [ˈlaskʲi ˈmawɛ]) is a village in the administrative district of Gmina Gąsawa, within Żnin County, Kuyavian-Pomeranian Voivodeship, in north-central Poland.
