= Skotniki, Drawsko County =

Skotniki
- Settlement
- Location within Poland
- Coordinates: 53°18′48″N 15°58′53″E
- Country: Poland
- Voivodeship: West Pomeranian
- County: Drawsko
- Gmina: Kalisz Pomorski

Skotniki [skɔtˈniki] (German: Heideschäferei) is a settlement in the administrative district of Gmina Kalisz Pomorski, within Drawsko County, West Pomeranian Voivodeship, in north-western Poland. It lies approximately 7 km (4 mi) north-east of Kalisz Pomorski, 28 km (17 mi) south-east of Drawsko Pomorskie, and 94 km (58 mi) east of the regional capital Szczecin.

For the history of the region, see History of Pomerania.
