= Biskupin, Żnin County =

Biskupin
- Village
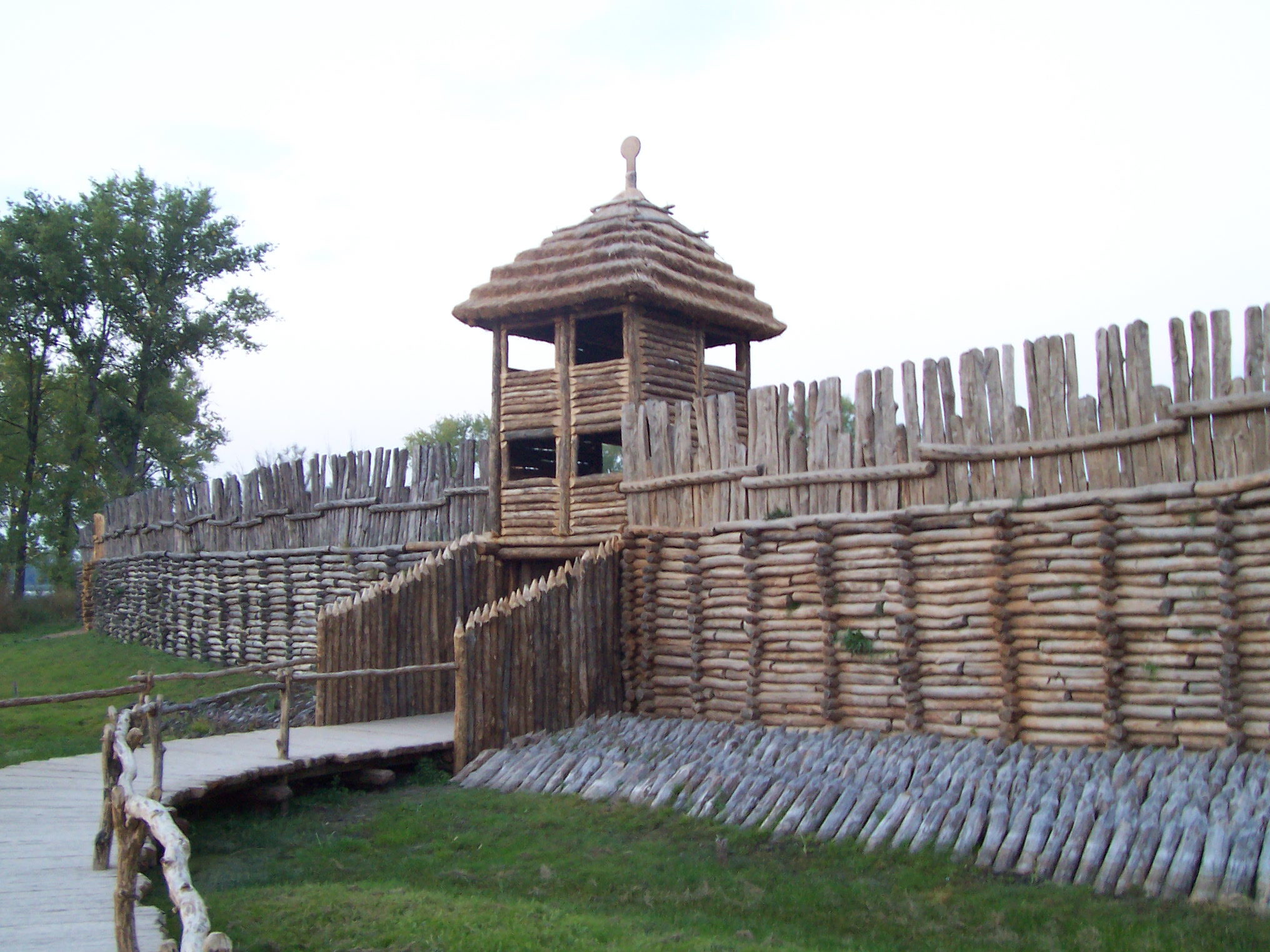
- Bronze gate and wall of Biskupin archaeological site, a reconstructed Lusatian culture settlement from Bronze Age

- Location within Poland
- Coordinates: 52°47′N 17°43′E
- Country: Poland
- Voivodeship: Kuyavian-Pomeranian
- County: Żnin
- Gmina: Gąsawa

Population
  - Total: 320

Biskupin (Polish pronunciation: [bisˈkupin]) is a village in the administrative district of Gmina Gąsawa, within Żnin County, Kuyavian-Pomeranian Voivodeship, in north-central Poland.
