= Piastowo, Kuyavian-Pomeranian Voivodeship =

Piastowo
- Village
- Location within Poland
- Coordinates: 52°47′N 17°51′E
- Country: Poland
- Voivodeship: Kuyavian-Pomeranian
- County: Żnin
- Gmina: Gąsawa

Piastowo [pjasˈtɔvɔ] is a village in the administrative district of Gmina Gąsawa, within Żnin County, Kuyavian-Pomeranian Voivodeship, in north-central Poland.
