= Gmina Gąsawa =

Gmina Gąsawa Gąsawa Commune
- Gmina
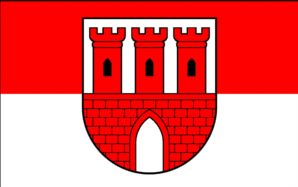
- Flag Coat of arms
- Interactive map of Gmina Gąsawa
- Coordinates (Gąsawa): 52°46′0″N 17°45′20″E
- Country: Poland
- Voivodeship: Kuyavian-Pomeranian
- County: Żnin
- Seat: Gąsawa

Area
  - Total: 135.7 km^{2} (52.4 sq mi)

Population (2006)
  - Total: 5,235
  - Density: 38.58/km^{2} (99.92/sq mi)
- Website: http://www.gasawa.pl

Gmina Gąsawa is an urban-rural gmina (administrative district) in Żnin County, Kuyavian-Pomeranian Voivodeship, in north-central Poland. Its seat is the village of Gąsawa, which lies approximately 10 kilometres (6 mi) south of Żnin and 43 km (27 mi) south-west of Bydgoszcz.

The gmina covers an area of 135.7 square kilometres (52.4 sq mi), and as of 2006 its total population is 5,235.

== Villages ==
Gmina Gąsawa contains the villages and settlements of Annowo, Bełki, Biskupin, Chomiąża Szlachecka, Drewno, Gąsawa, Głowy, Godawy, Gogółkowo, Komratowo, Laski Małe, Laski Wielkie, Łysinin, Marcinkowo Dolne, Marcinkowo Górne, Nowa Wieś Pałucka, Obudno, Oćwieka, Ostrówce, Piastowo, Pniewy, Rozalinowo, Ryszewko and Szelejewo.

== Neighbouring gminas ==
Gmina Gąsawa is bordered by the gminas of Dąbrowa, Mogilno, Rogowo and Żnin.
