= Pruszcz, Drawsko County =

Pruszcz
- Settlement
- Location within Poland
- Coordinates: 53°18′8″N 15°58′33″E
- Country: Poland
- Voivodeship: West Pomeranian
- County: Drawsko
- Gmina: Kalisz Pomorski

Pruszcz [pruʂt͡ʂ] (German: Ratheide) is a settlement in the administrative district of Gmina Kalisz Pomorski, within Drawsko County, West Pomeranian Voivodeship, in north-western Poland. It lies approximately 6 km (4 mi) north-east of Kalisz Pomorski, 29 km (18 mi) south-east of Drawsko Pomorskie, and 94 km (58 mi) east of the regional capital Szczecin.

For the history of the region, see History of Pomerania.
