= Pniewy, West Pomeranian Voivodeship =

Pniewy
- Settlement
- Location within Poland
- Coordinates: 53°19′23″N 15°55′7″E
- Country: Poland
- Voivodeship: West Pomeranian
- County: Drawsko
- Gmina: Kalisz Pomorski
- Time zone: UTC+1 (CET)
  - Summer (DST): UTC+2 (CEST)
- Vehicle registration: ZDR

Pniewy [ˈpɲɛvɨ] (German: Jägerhof) is a settlement in the administrative district of Gmina Kalisz Pomorski, within Drawsko County, West Pomeranian Voivodeship, in north-western Poland. It lies approximately 5 km (3 mi) north of Kalisz Pomorski, 25 km (16 mi) south of Drawsko Pomorskie, and 90 km (56 mi) east of the regional capital Szczecin.

== History ==
In the 10th century the area became part of the emerging Polish state and then formed part of Poland, and later on it also was part of Prussia, and Germany. After Germany's defeat in World War II, in 1945, the area became again part of Poland.
