= Komratowo =

- Village
- Location within Poland
- Coordinates: 52°46′N 17°47′E
- Country: Poland
- Voivodeship: Kuyavian-Pomeranian
- County: Żnin
- Gmina: Gąsawa

Komratowo [kɔmraˈtɔvɔ] is a village in the administrative district of Gmina Gąsawa, within Żnin County, Kuyavian-Pomeranian Voivodeship, in north-central Poland.
