= Ryszewko, Kuyavian-Pomeranian Voivodeship =

Ryszewko
- Village
- Location within Poland
- Coordinates: 52°42′N 17°45′E
- Country: Poland
- Voivodeship: Kuyavian-Pomeranian
- County: Żnin
- Gmina: Gąsawa

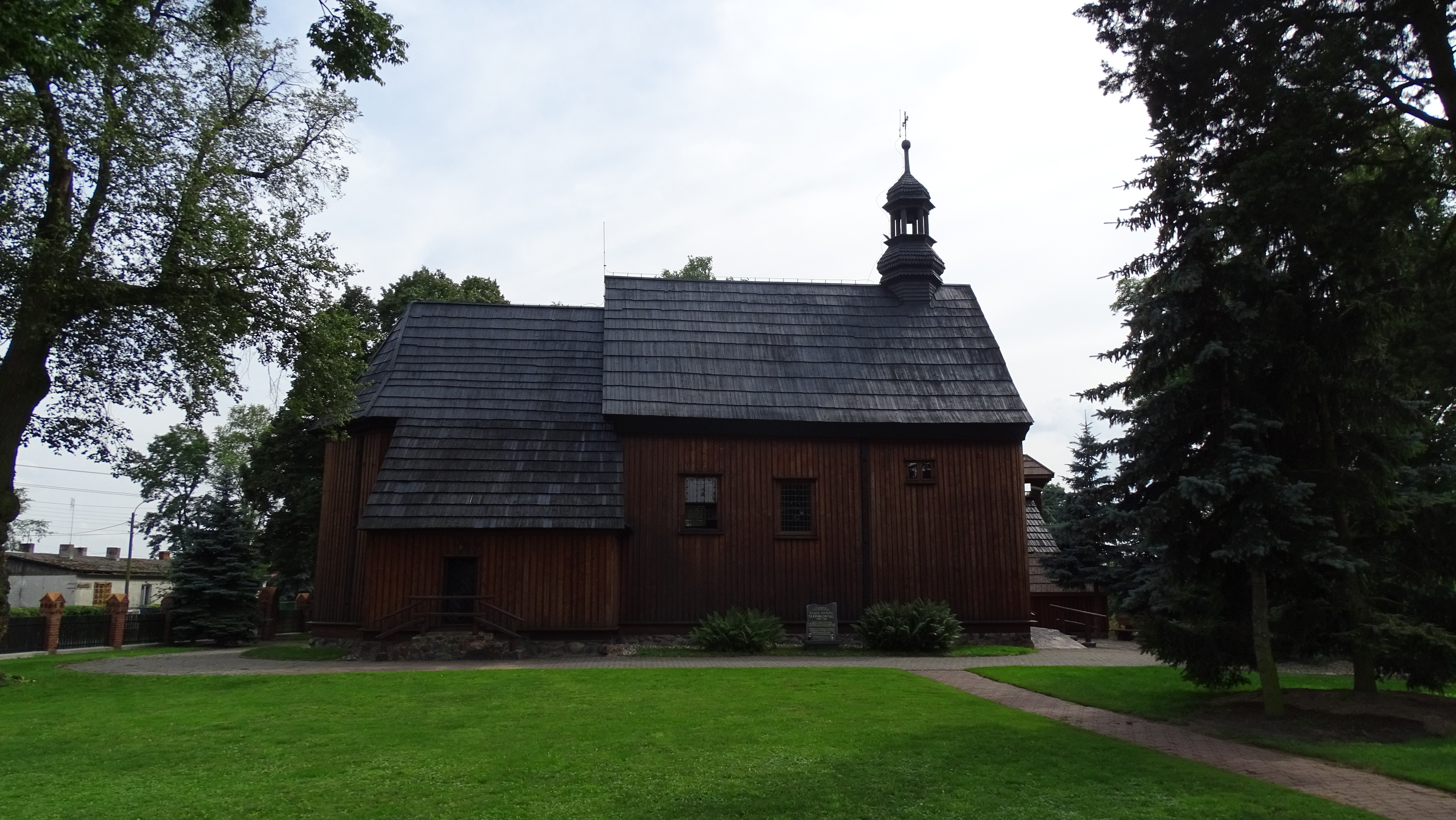
Mary Magdalene wooden church from second half of the 18th century.

Ryszewko [rɨˈʂɛfkɔ] is a village in the administrative district of Gmina Gąsawa, within Żnin County, Kuyavian-Pomeranian Voivodeship, in north-central Poland.
