= Wet Lake (Kuyavia-Pomerania Voivodeship) =

Lake in Poland

- Location within Kuyavian-Pomeranian Voivodeship
- Location: Kuyavia-Pomerania Voivodeship
- Coordinates: 52°45′37″N 17°55′12″E
- Basin countries: Poland

Wet Lake (Jezioro Mokre) is a small lake in Poland situated in Kuyavia-Pomerania Voivodeship in Mogileński county in Dąbrowa commune, surrounded with farmland. There are 4 nearby villages: Mokre, Pałucka New Village, Obudno and Dąbrowa (Mogileński county).
