= Laski Wielkie, Kuyavian-Pomeranian Voivodeship =

Laski Wielkie
- Village
- Location within Poland
- Coordinates: 52°46′N 17°51′E
- Country: Poland
- Voivodeship: Kuyavian-Pomeranian
- County: Żnin
- Gmina: Gąsawa
- Population: 110

Laski Wielkie [ˈlaski ˈvjɛlkʲɛ] is a village in the administrative district of Gmina Gąsawa, within Żnin County, Kuyavian-Pomeranian Voivodeship, in north-central Poland.
