= Nowa Wieś Pałucka =

- Village
- Location within Poland
- Coordinates: 52°45′07″N 17°52′47″E
- Country: Poland
- Voivodeship: Kuyavian-Pomeranian
- County: Żnin
- Gmina: Gąsawa

Nowa Wieś Pałucka [ˈnɔva ˈvjɛɕ paˈwut͡ska] is a village in the administrative district of Gmina Gąsawa, within Żnin County, Kuyavian-Pomeranian Voivodeship, in north-central Poland.
