= Annowo, Gmina Gąsawa =

Annowo
- Village
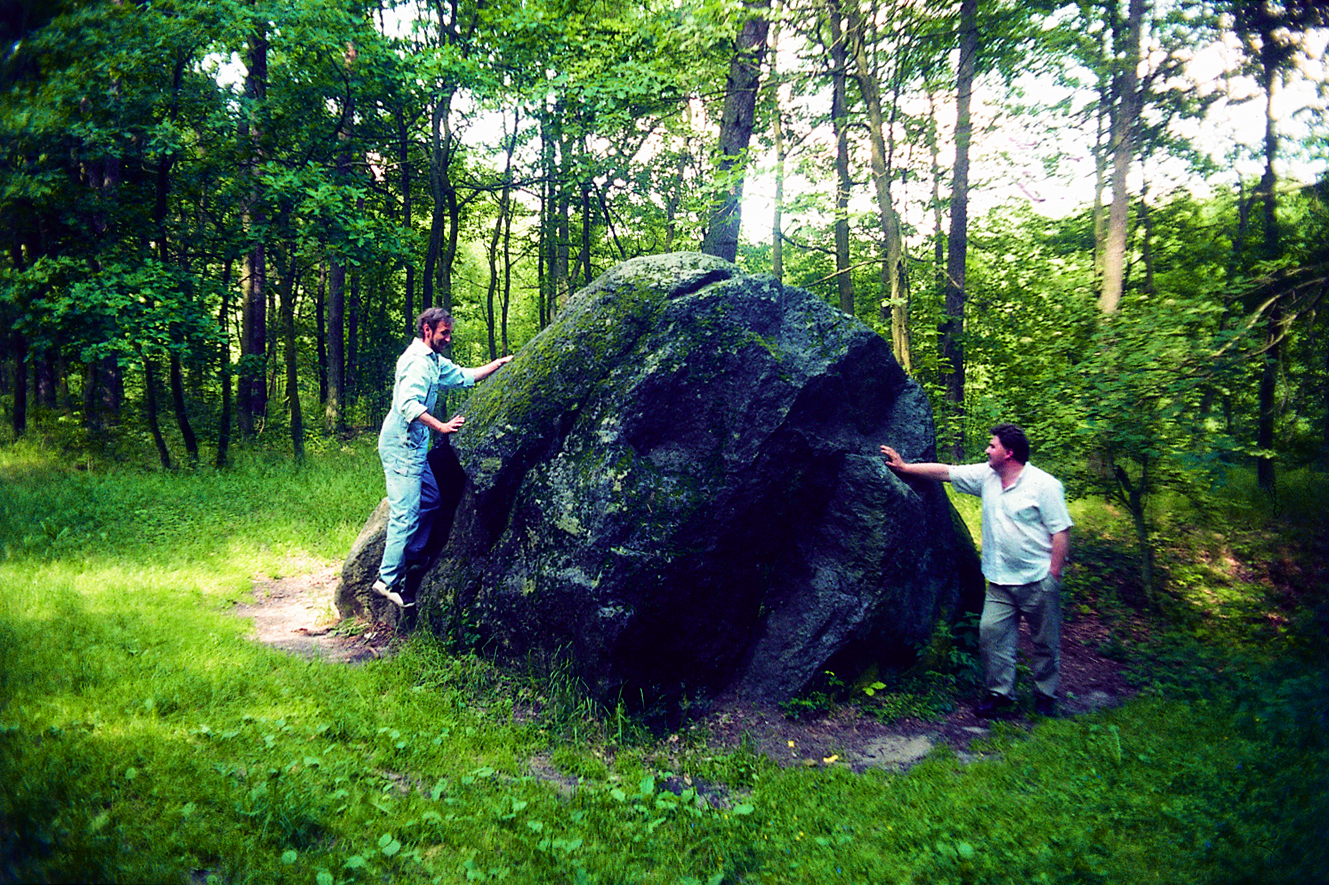

- Location within Poland
- Coordinates: 52°48′38″N 17°52′21″E
- Country: Poland
- Voivodeship: Kuyavian-Pomeranian
- County: Żnin
- Gmina: Gąsawa

Annowo [anˈnɔvɔ] is a village in the administrative district of Gmina Gąsawa, within Żnin County, Kuyavian-Pomeranian Voivodeship, in north-central Poland.
