= Pruszcz Gdański =

Town in Pomeranian Voivodeship, Poland

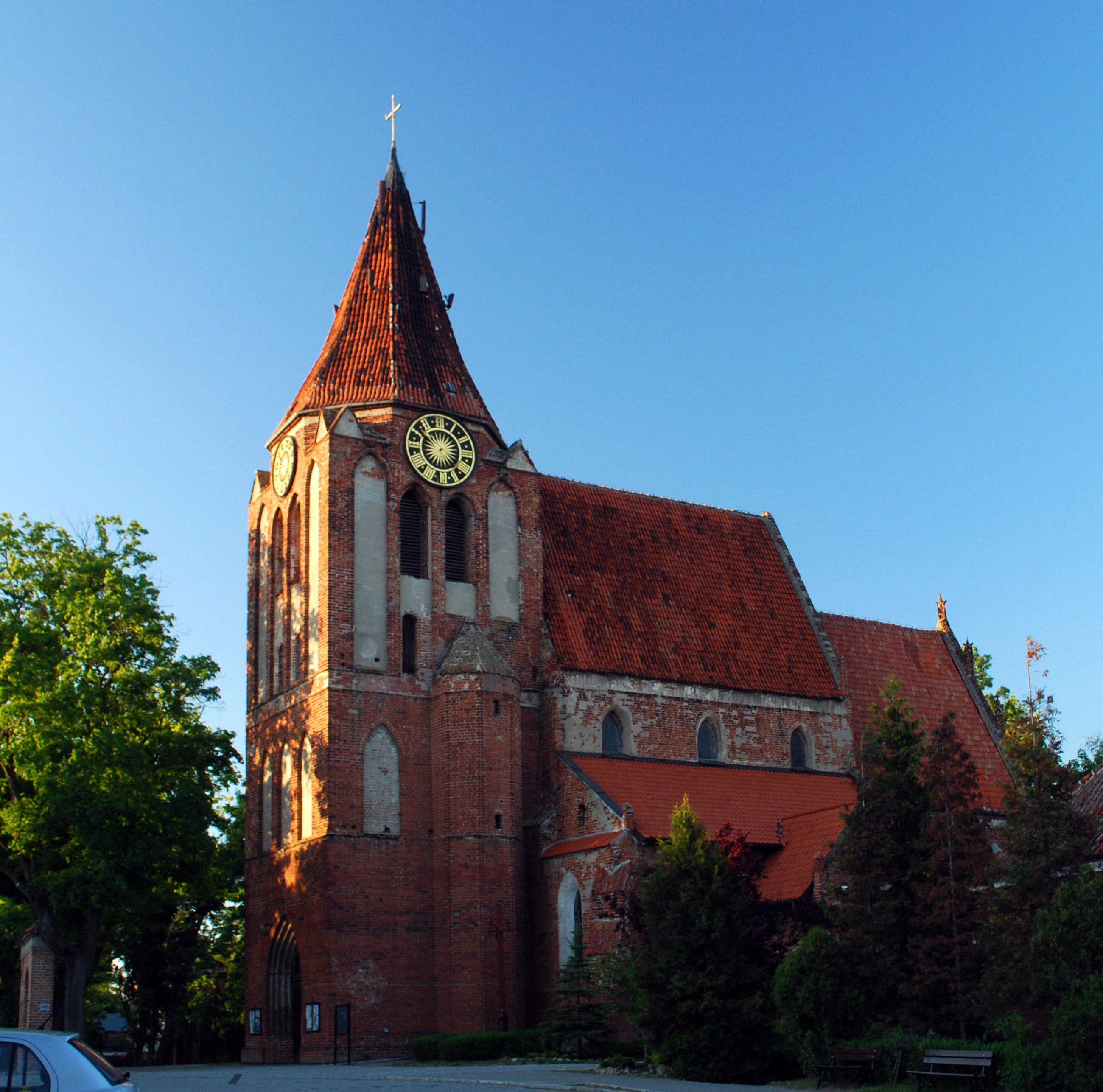
- Exaltation of the Holy Cross Church

- Flag Coat of arms

- Location within Poland
- Coordinates: 54°16′N 18°38′E
- Country: Poland
- Voivodeship: Pomeranian
- County: Gdańsk
- Gmina: Pruszcz Gdański (urban gmina)
- First mentioned: 1307
- Town rights: 1941

Government
  - Mayor: Janusz Wróbel

Area
  - Total: 16.47 km^{2} (6.36 sq mi)

Population (2021)
  - Total: 31,822
  - Density: 1,932/km^{2} (5,004/sq mi)
- Time zone: UTC+1 (CET)
  - Summer (DST): UTC+2 (CEST)
- Postal code: 83-000
- Area code: +48 58
- Vehicle registration: GDA
- Website: www.pruszcz-gdanski.pl

Pruszcz Gdański (Polish pronunciation: [pruʂtʂ ˈɡdaj̃skʲi]; former Polish: Pruszcz; German: Praust) is a town in Pomerania, northern Poland with 26,834 inhabitants (2010). Pruszcz Gdański is an industrial town neighbouring Gdańsk, part of the Tricity agglomeration. The Tricity Bypass begins in Pruszcz Gdański. The capital of Gdańsk County in the Pomeranian Voivodeship. The town is served by a railway station.

== History ==
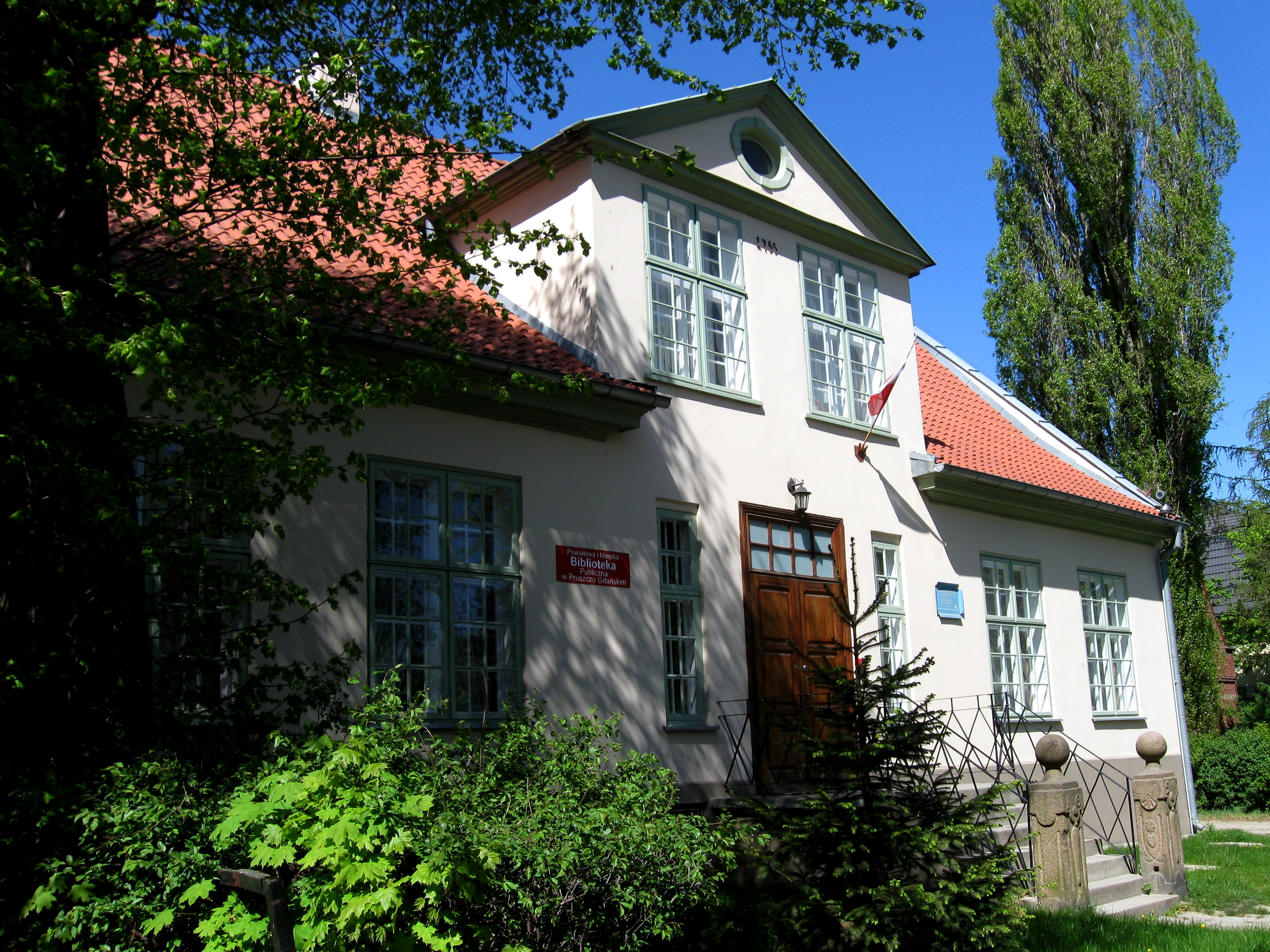
Baroque rectory, now a public library

Human settlement in Pruszcz Gdański dates back to prehistoric times. Various traces of human settlement and cemeteries from the Bronze and Iron Ages and ancient Roman times were discovered during archaeological excavations within the modern town limits. The territory became part of the emerging Polish state in the 10th century under its first historic ruler Mieszko I. The oldest known mention of Pruszcz comes from 1307. It was invaded and occupied by the Teutonic Knights in the following years. In the 14th century, the Radunia Canal was built. In 1454, King Casimir IV Jagiellon reincorporated the area to the Kingdom of Poland. During the subsequent Thirteen Years' War, it was the site of the Battle of Pruszcz Gdański between forces from the Polish-allied city of Gdańsk and the Teutonic Knights. The restoration of the region to Poland was confirmed by the peace treaty of 1466. Pruszcz was a possession of the city of Gdańsk, administratively located in the Pomeranian Voivodeship in the Royal Prussia and Greater Poland provinces. Polish Kings often stopped in Pruszcz when travelling to the nearby city of Gdańsk.

Pruszcz was annexed by the Kingdom of Prussia in the Partitions of Poland, and from 1871 to 1920 it was also part of Germany. It had a mixed Catholic and Lutheran population, with small Jewish and Mennonite minorities. Unlike most of Eastern Pomerania, the town did not return to Poland after regaining independence, but was included in the short-lived Free City of Danzig by the Treaty of Versailles. During World War II, it was occupied by Nazi Germany. Poles from Leśniewo and Swarzewo were enslaved as forced labour at local farms, and Jewish women were similarly enslaved in a subcamp of the Stutthof concentration camp. On 8 September 1944, the Polish resistance pried up the rails and derailed a German freight train. Following Germany's defeat in the war, the town became again part of Poland, although with a Soviet-installed communist regime, which stayed in power until the Fall of Communism in the 1980s.

As early as 30 March 1945, the Polish Post Office began its work as the first post-war Polish institution in the town. In post-war Poland the adjective Gdański was added to the town's name, after the nearby city of Gdańsk, to distinguish the town from other Polish settlements of the same name.

In August 1980, local workplaces joined the Inter-Enterprise Strike Committee in Gdańsk, during the 1980 strikes, which led to the creation of Solidarity.

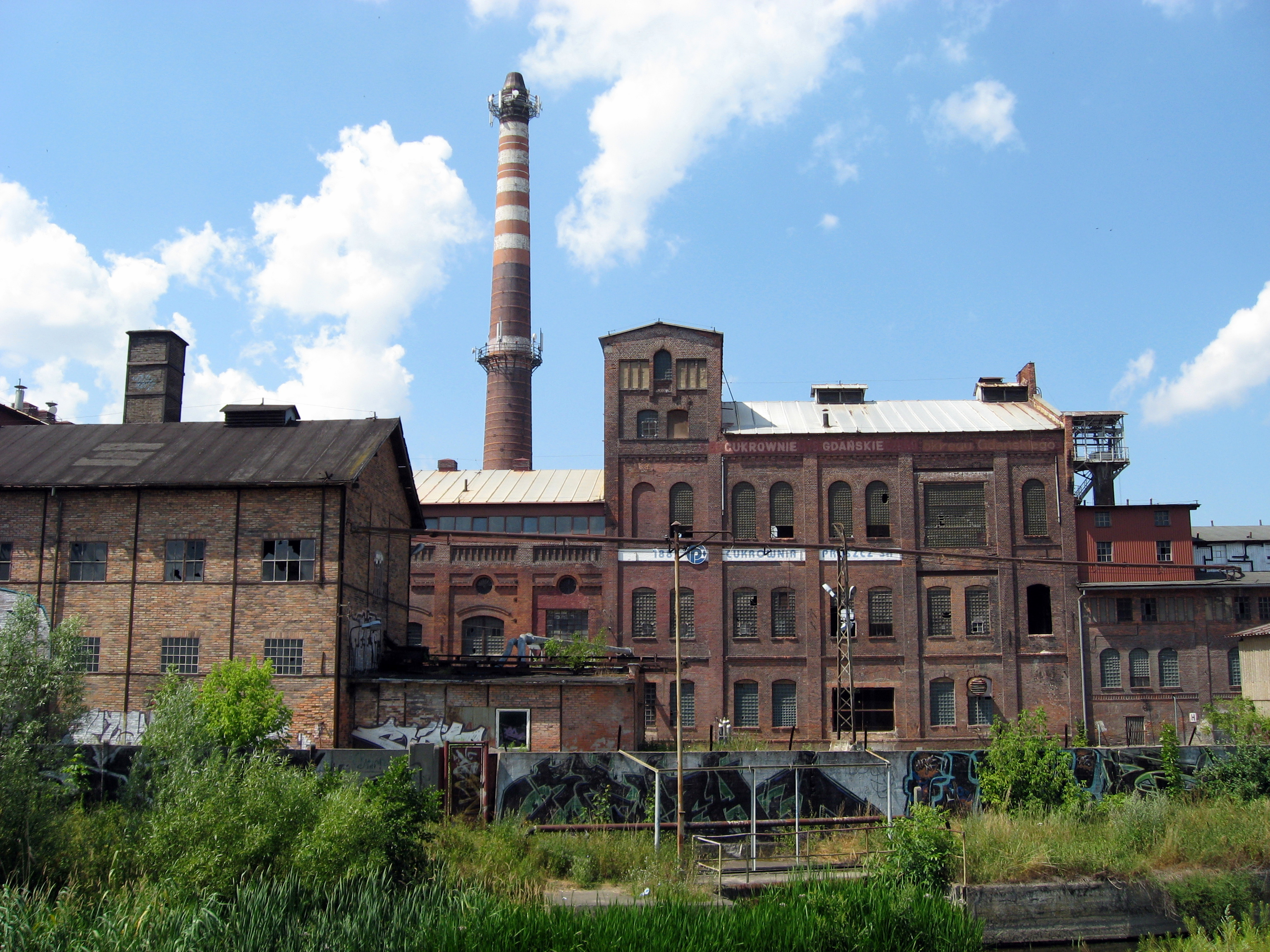
The sugar plant in Pruszcz Gdański

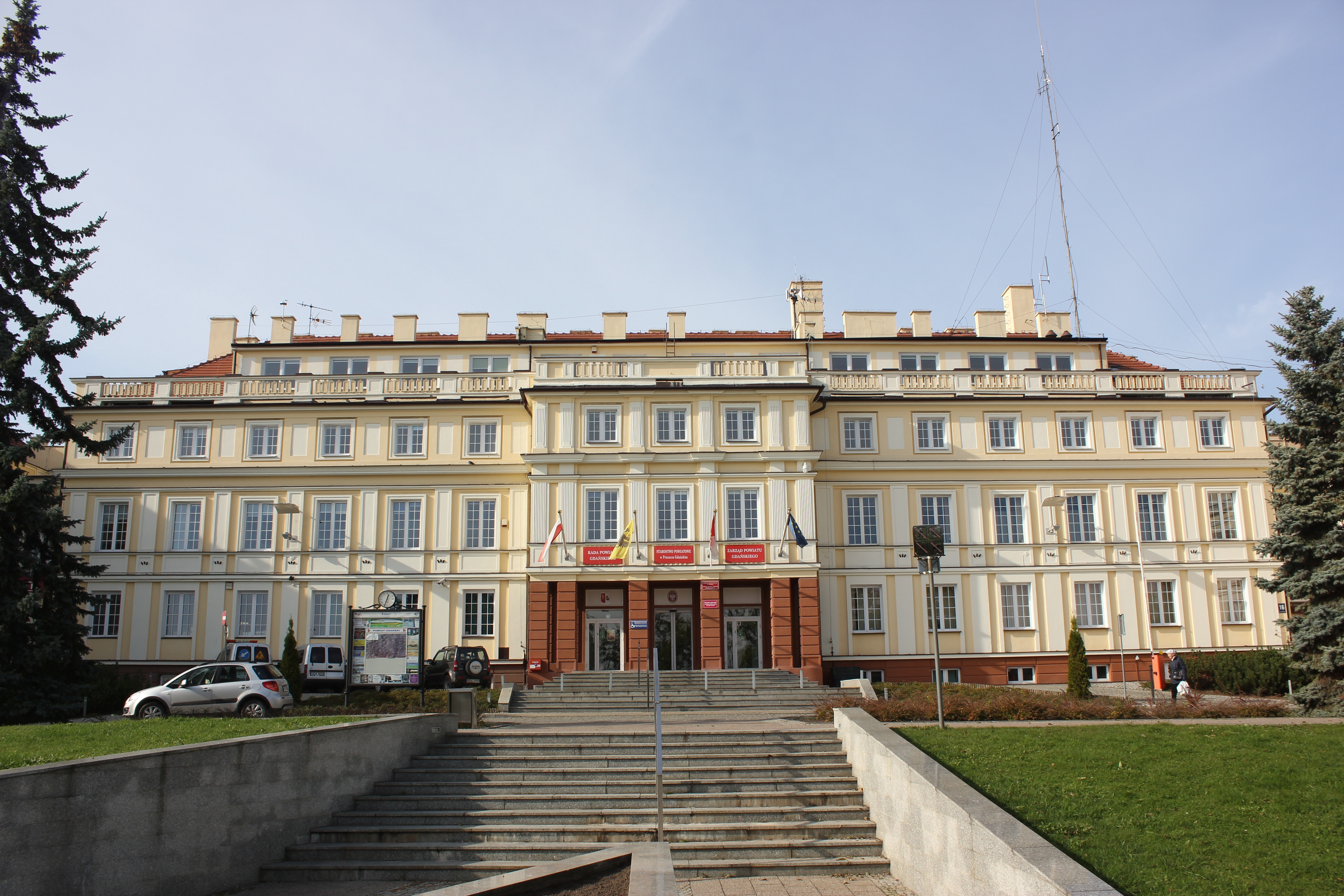
County Office

== Education ==
Schools:

- Zespół Szkół Ogólnokształcących nr 1
- Liceum Ogólnokształcące
- Gimnazjum nr 1
- Szkoła Podstawowa nr 3
- Zespół Szkół nr 4
- Catolic Public Schools|Katolickie Szkoły Niepubliczne im. Jana Pawła II
- Prywatna Szkoła Muzyczna I stopnia

Preschools:

- Przedszkole Publiczne nr 3
- Przedszkole Nad Rzeczką
- Niepubliczne Przedszkole im. Janusza Korczaka
- Niepubliczne Przedszkole "Promyczek"
- Oddziały Przedszkolne Szkoły Podstawowej nr 2 "Dwójeczka"
- Niepubliczne Przedszkole "Jedyneczka"
- Niepubliczne przedszkole "Czwóreczka"

== Population ==
According to data provided by the Central Statistical Office, the population of the town of Pruszcz is as follows over the years:

| Year | Population | Men | Women |
|---|---|---|---|
| 1960 | 7 800 | no data | no data |
| 1970 | 13 100 | no data | no data |
| 1975 | 16 200 | no data | no data |
| 1980 | 18 500 | no data | no data |
| 1990 | 21 100 | no data | no data |
| 1995 | 21 318 | 10 358 | 10 960 |
| 1996 | 21 470 | 10 426 | 11 044 |
| 1997 | 21 509 | 10 438 | 11 071 |
| 1998 | 21 585 | 10 455 | 11 130 |
| 1999 | 22 187 | 10 723 | 11 464 |
| 2000 | 22 367 | 10 801 | 11 566 |
| 2001 | 22 661 | 10 958 | 11 703 |
| 2002 | 22 897 | 11 013 | 11 884 |
| 2003 | 23 187 | 11 150 | 12 037 |
| 2004 | 23 529 | 11 325 | 12 204 |
| 2005 | 23 800 | 11 425 | 12 375 |
| 2006 | 24 276 | 11 633 | 12 643 |
| 2007 | 25 143 | 11 976 | 13 167 |
| 2008 | 25 626 | 12 215 | 13 411 |
| 2009 | 26 298 | 12 516 | 13 782 |
| 2010 | 27 678 | 13 205 | 14 473 |
| 2011 | 28 095 | 13 402 | 14 693 |
| 2012 | 28 621 | 13 674 | 14 947 |
| 2013 | 28 858 | 13 794 | 15 064 |
| 2014 | 29 226 | 13 981 | 15 245 |
| 2015 | 29 589 | 14 150 | 15 439 |
| 2016 | 30 106 | 14 379 | 15 727 |
| 2017 | 30 468 | 14 501 | 15 967 |
| 2018 | 30 878 | 14 676 | 16 202 |
| 2019 | 31 326 | 14 929 | 16 397 |
| 2020 | 31 578 | 16 505 | 15 073 |
| 2021 | 31 949 | 16 696 | 15 253 |
| 2022 | 32 031 | 15 394 | 16 637 |
| 2023 | 32 093 | 15 412 | 16 681 |

Pruszcz Gdański is a small town with a population of 32,093, of which 52.0% are women and 48.0% are men. From 2002 to 2023, the population increased by 40.2%. The average age of residents is 39.2 years, which is slightly lower than the average age of residents of the Pomeranian Voivodeship and lower than the average age of residents of all of Poland. In 2022, residents of Pruszcz Gdański entered into 154 marriages, which corresponds to 4.8 marriages per 1,000 residents. This is higher than the rate for the Pomeranian Voivodeship and significantly higher than the rate for Poland. During the same period, there were 1.6 divorces per 1,000 residents, a rate comparable to that of the Pomeranian Voivodeship and the country. 29.2% of Pruszcz Gdański residents are single, 57.4% are married, 7.2% are divorced, and 5.9% are widowed. Pruszcz Gdański has a positive natural increase of 61, which corresponds to a natural increase of 1.91 per 1,000 residents. In 2022, 301 children were born, of which 49.2% were girls and 50.8% were boys. The average weight of newborns was 3,407 grams. The demographic dynamics ratio, which is the ratio of the number of live births to the number of deaths, is 1.20, significantly higher than the average for the voivodeship and significantly higher than the demographic dynamics ratio for the entire country. In 2022, 34.7% of deaths in Pruszcz Gdański were caused by cardiovascular diseases, 26.8% were caused by cancer, and 6.3% were caused by respiratory diseases. There are 7.51 deaths per 1,000 residents of Pruszcz Gdański, significantly lower than the average for the Pomeranian Voivodeship and significantly lower than the average for the country. In 2022, there were 572 registrations of internal migration and 374 deregistrations, resulting in a net internal migration balance of 198 for Pruszcz Gdański. In the same year, 18 people registered from abroad, and 7 deregistrations abroad were recorded, resulting in a net foreign migration balance of 11. 60.5% of Pruszcz Gdański residents are of working age, 20.7% are of pre-working age, and 18.7% are of post-working age.

Pruszcz, with a population growth rate of +34.21%, ranked third among Polish cities in terms of population growth rate from 2004 to 2020, after Piaseczno (+45.06%) and Grodzisk Mazowiecki (+36.97%).

== Sports ==
The local football club is Czarni Pruszcz Gdański.

== Notable people ==
- Mateusz Bąk (born 1983), Polish footballer; played for Lechia Gdańsk as a goalkeeper
- Abelard Giza (born 1980), Polish comedian, writer, filmmaker, and actor
- Edward Jurkiewicz (born 1948), Polish former professional basketball player; competed in the 1968 Summer Olympics
