= Gąsawa massacre =

1227 massacre of Piast-dynasty dukes in Gąsawa, Poland

The Gąsawa massacre (Polish: Zbrodnia gąsawska, lit. 'Gąsawa crime') was an attack on the night of 23-24 November 1227, during a council of Polish Piast dukes that was being held near the village of Gąsawa in Kuyavia, Poland. The High Duke of Poland, Leszek the White, was assassinated, and Duke Henry the Bearded of Silesia was gravely wounded.

At the time of the attack, some of the victims were bathing in preparation for retiring for the night, and so the event is also known in Polish historiography as the Gąsawa bloodbath (Polish: krwawa łaźnia w Gąsawie).

== Motive ==
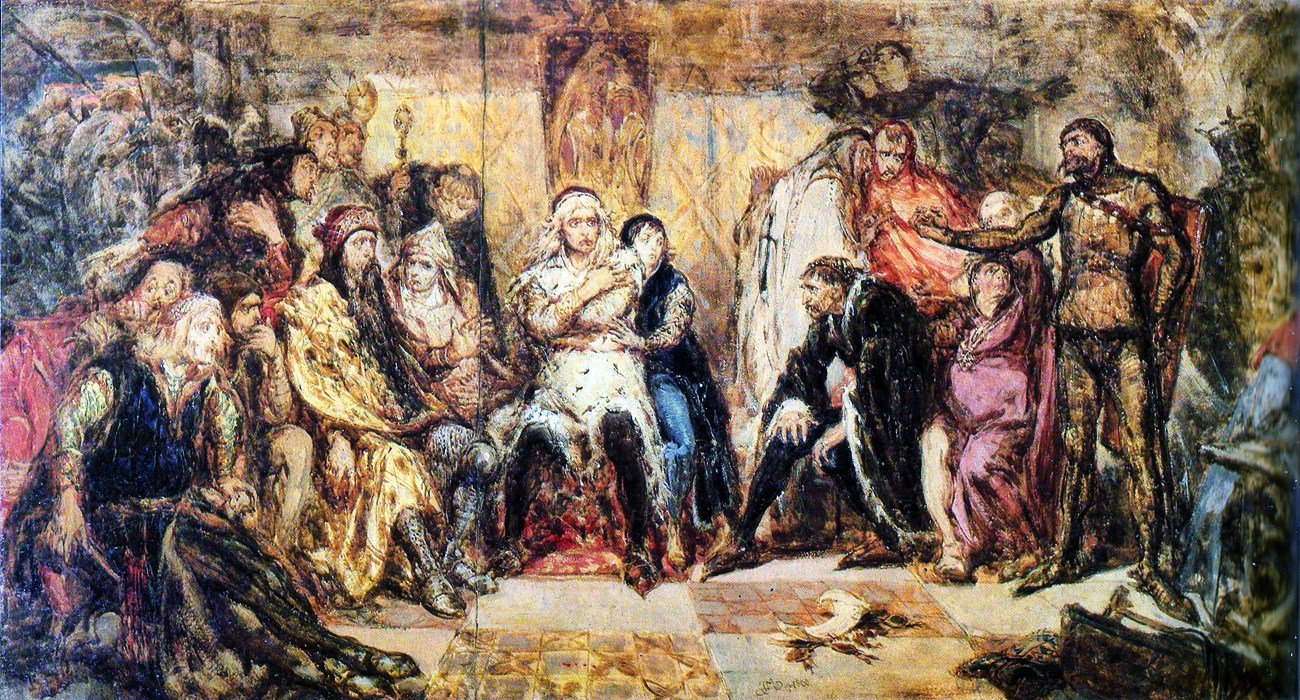
The Gąsawa Congress, by Matejko. Participants in discussion before the massacre.

Responsibility for the attack is generally ascribed by historians to Świętopełk of Pomerania. Świętopełk's aim was to make the Duchy of Gdańsk Pomerania, which his House of Sobiesław held as regents of the Polish rulers, independent of Piast overlordship. The murder of Leszek the White, Świętopełk's suzerain, thus served his interests. However, several historians have pointed to Duke Władysław Odonic, who had forged an alliance with Świętopełk shortly before the attack, as the main instigator. Odonic's actual target would have been his uncle, Duke Władysław Spindleshanks, with whom Odonic had been involved in a long-running conflict over control of Greater Poland (Wielkopolska). Under this hypothesis, Odonic provided Świętopełk's man with the information necessary for a successful attack.

Other historians have disputed this thesis, pointing out that Spindleshanks was not harmed in the attack, that Odonic did not profit from the death of Leszek (with whom he generally enjoyed amicable relations), and that there is no record that contemporaries or the families of the slain held Odonic responsible. Rather, in this view, the blame was ascribed retroactively to Odonic several decades later, during fighting between dukes of Silesia, who were descendants of Henry, and those of Greater Poland, who were related to Odonic. A particularly puzzling fact is the absence of condemnation by ecclesiastical authorities (some of whom were present at the meeting), who at that time took an active role in Polish political affairs and tended to react strongly to regicides.

== Outcomes ==
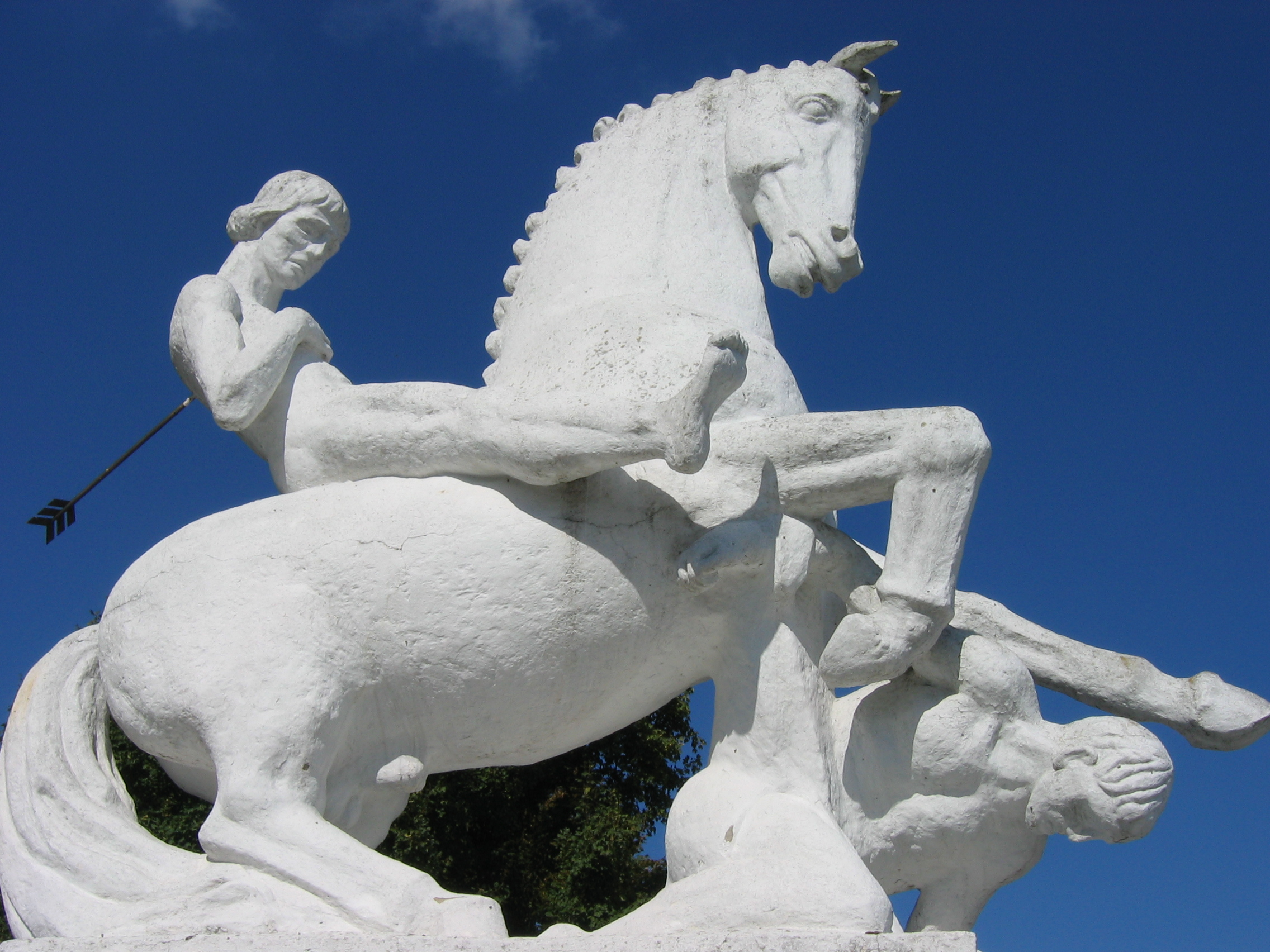
Monument at the site of Leszek's death

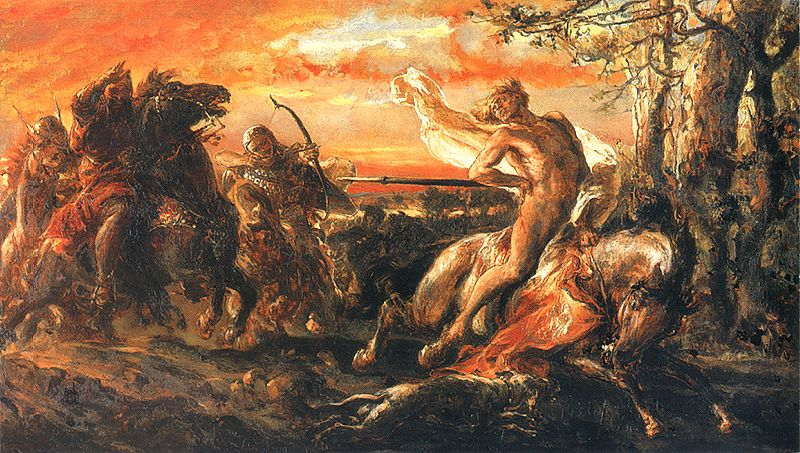
Death of Leszek the White, by Matejko. Leszek, High Duke of Poland, was caught in his bath but fled on horseback. The attackers caught up with him a few kilometers out of Gąsawa.

Whatever the exact circumstances of the event, or responsibility for it, it is generally accepted that the crime contributed to the deepening of the feudal fragmentation of Poland. Świętopełk successfully cast off the control of the Piast dukes over Gdańsk Pomerania and began using the title dux (rather than "regent"). Piast control over the area was not re-established until the Treaty of Kępno (1282) between Mściwój II of Pomerania and Przemysł II (perhaps ironically, a grandson of Odonic).

The death of Leszek the White undermined the authority and status of the "High Duke of Poland" (principat), who technically ruled over all the other regional Polish dukes; the "seniorate" province of Kraków/Małopolska essentially became just another feudal area to be fought over. Poland, as a unified political entity, would not be re-established until the reign of Wenceslaus III or Władysław the Elbow-high at the turn of the 13th and 14th centuries.
