= Drewno, Kuyavian-Pomeranian Voivodeship =

Drewno
- Village
- Location within Poland
- Coordinates: 52°43′N 17°50′E
- Country: Poland
- Voivodeship: Kuyavian-Pomeranian
- County: Żnin
- Gmina: Gąsawa

Drewno [ˈdrɛvnɔ] is a village in the administrative district of Gmina Gąsawa, within Żnin County, Kuyavian-Pomeranian Voivodeship, in north-central Poland.
