= Marcinkowo Dolne =

- Village
- Location within Poland
- Coordinates: 52°46′11″N 17°42′6″E
- Country: Poland
- Voivodeship: Kuyavian-Pomeranian
- County: Żnin
- Gmina: Gąsawa
- Population: 84

Marcinkowo Dolne [mart͡ɕiŋˈkɔvɔ ˈdɔlnɛ] is a village in the administrative district of Gmina Gąsawa, within Żnin County, Kuyavian-Pomeranian Voivodeship, in north-central Poland.
