= Chomiąża Szlachecka =

- Village
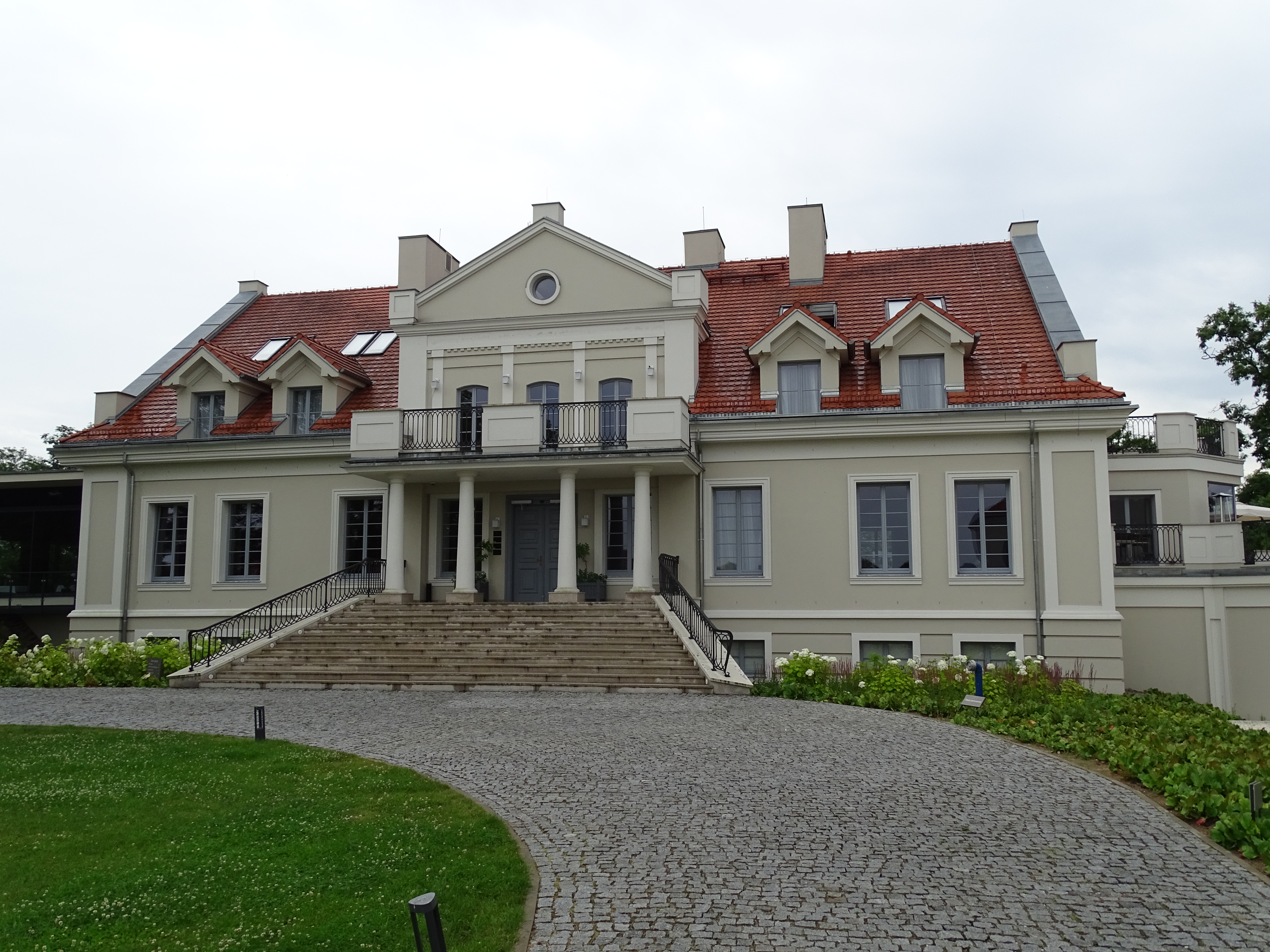
- The manor house, built in the second half of the 19th century.

- Location within Poland
- Coordinates: 52°46′N 17°51′E
- Country: Poland
- Voivodeship: Kuyavian-Pomeranian
- County: Żnin
- Gmina: Gąsawa

Chomiąża Szlachecka [xɔˈmjɔ̃ʐa ʂlaˈxɛt͡ska] is a village in the administrative district of Gmina Gąsawa, within Żnin County, Kuyavian-Pomeranian Voivodeship, in north-central Poland.
