= Łowno =

- Settlement
- Location within Poland
- Coordinates: 53°13′49″N 15°49′02″E
- Country: Poland
- Voivodeship: West Pomeranian
- County: Drawsko
- Gmina: Kalisz Pomorski

Łowno [ˈwɔvnɔ] (German: Lauenbrügge) is a settlement in the administrative district of Gmina Kalisz Pomorski, within Drawsko County, West Pomeranian Voivodeship, in north-western Poland.

For the history of the region, see History of Pomerania.
