= Lipinki, West Pomeranian Voivodeship =

Lipinki
- Settlement
- Location within Poland
- Coordinates: 53°17′4″N 15°54′16″E
- Country: Poland
- Voivodeship: West Pomeranian
- County: Drawsko
- Gmina: Kalisz Pomorski

Lipinki [lʲiˈpʲiŋkʲi] (German: Johannenfeld) is a settlement in the administrative district of Gmina Kalisz Pomorski, within Drawsko County, West Pomeranian Voivodeship, in north-western Poland. It lies approximately 29 km (18 mi) south of Drawsko Pomorskie and 90 km (56 mi) east of the regional capital Szczecin.

For the history of the region, see History of Pomerania.
