= Gmina Kalisz Pomorski =

Gmina Kalisz Pomorski Kalisz Pomorski Commune
- Gmina
- Flag Coat of arms
- Interactive map of Gmina Kalisz Pomorski
- Coordinates (Kalisz Pomorski): 53°17′N 15°54′E
- Country: Poland
- Voivodeship: West Pomeranian
- County: Drawsko
- Seat: Kalisz Pomorski

Area
  - Total: 480.53 km^{2} (185.53 sq mi)

Population (2006)
  - Total: 7,150
  - Density: 14.9/km^{2} (38.5/sq mi)
  - Urban: 3,989
  - Rural: 3,161
- Website: http://www.kaliszpom.pl/

Gmina Kalisz Pomorski is an urban-rural gmina (administrative district) in Drawsko County, West Pomeranian Voivodeship, in north-western Poland. Its seat is the town of Kalisz Pomorski, which lies approximately 29 kilometres (18 mi) south of Drawsko Pomorskie and 89 km (55 mi) east of the regional capital Szczecin.

The gmina covers an area of 480.53 square kilometres (185.5 sq mi), and as of 2006 its total population is 7,150 (out of which the population of Kalisz Pomorski amounts to 3,989, and the population of the rural part of the gmina is 3,161).

== Villages ==
Apart from the town of Kalisz Pomorski, Gmina Kalisz Pomorski contains the villages and settlements of Biały Zdrój, Borowo, Bralin, Cybowo, Dębsko, Giżyno, Głębokie, Jasnopole, Jaworze, Karwiagać, Krężno, Lipinki, Łowno, Pepłówek, Pniewy, Pomierzyn, Poźrzadło Małe, Poźrzadło Wielkie, Prostynia, Pruszcz, Siekiercze, Sienica, Skotniki, Ślizno, Smugi, Stara Korytnica, Stara Studnica, Suchowo, Tarnice and Wierzchucin.

== Neighbouring gminas ==
Gmina Kalisz Pomorski is bordered by the gminas of Dobrzany, Drawno, Drawsko Pomorskie, Ińsko, Mirosławiec, Recz, Tuczno, Wierzchowo and Złocieniec.
