= Pniewy, Kuyavian-Pomeranian Voivodeship =

Pniewy
- Village
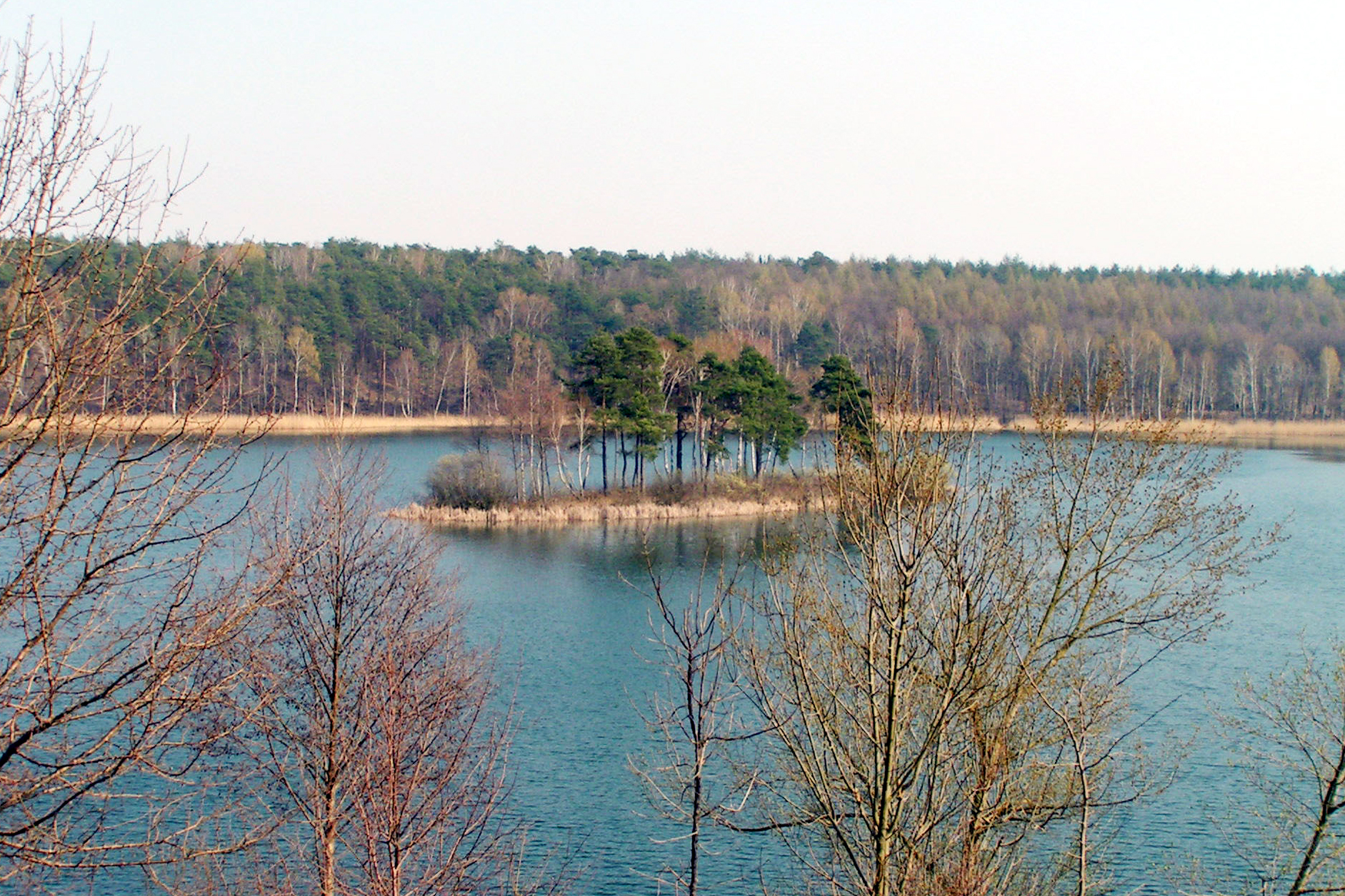
- Pniewskie Lake

- Location within Poland
- Coordinates: 52°48′N 17°50′E
- Country: Poland
- Voivodeship: Kuyavian-Pomeranian
- County: Żnin
- Gmina: Gąsawa
- Time zone: UTC+1 (CET)
  - Summer (DST): UTC+2 (CEST)
- Vehicle registration: CZN

Pniewy [ˈpɲɛvɨ] is a village in the administrative district of Gmina Gąsawa, within Żnin County, Kuyavian-Pomeranian Voivodeship, in north-central Poland.

== History ==
Pniewy was mentioned in the Bull of Gniezno from 1136 and a royal privilege of Polish King Casimir III the Great from 1357 as a possession of the Archdiocese of Gniezno. It was a private church village, administratively located in the Kcynia County in the Kalisz Voivodeship in the Greater Poland Province of the Kingdom of Poland. In the late 19th century, it had a population of 137.

During the German occupation (World War II), in 1940, the occupiers carried out expulsions of Poles, who were then deported to the General Government in the more eastern part of German-occupied Poland, while their farms were handed over to German colonists as part of the Lebensraum policy.
