= Ostrówce =

- Village
- Location within Poland
- Coordinates: 52°48′18″N 17°51′5″E
- Country: Poland
- Voivodeship: Kuyavian-Pomeranian
- County: Żnin
- Gmina: Gąsawa

Ostrówce [ɔsˈtruft͡sɛ] is a village in the administrative district of Gmina Gąsawa, within Żnin County, Kuyavian-Pomeranian Voivodeship, in north-central Poland.
