= Bull of Gniezno =

Bull issued by Pope Innocent II in 1136

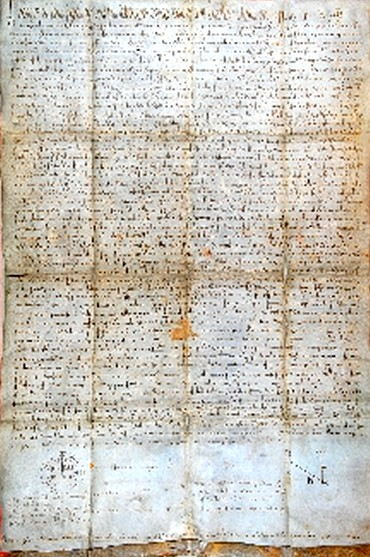
Bull of Gniezno

Ex commisso nobis, more commonly known as the Bull of Gniezno, was a papal bull issued on July 7, 1136 by Pope Innocent II. The bull split off the Bishopric of Gniezno from the Archbishop of Magdeburg. From a historical perspective, the bull is especially important as it contains the earliest written record of the Polish language. Slavic language scholar Aleksander Brückner called the document "złota bulla języka polskiego" ("the golden bull of the Polish language").

== Historical context ==
The election of Pope Innocent II in 1130 prompted a schism in the Roman Catholic Church. The Polish church supported the appointment of the Antipope Anacletus II, while Saint Norbert of Xanten, Archbishop of Magdeburg, remained faithful to Innocent. In Norbert's last years, he was chancellor and adviser to Lothair II, the Holy Roman Emperor, and persuaded him to lead an army to Rome to restore Innocent to the papacy in 1133.

Following Norbert's death, Lothair pressured Innocent to issue an order rejecting the independence and authority of the Archbishop of Gniezno, and affirming the Archbishop of Magdeburg's authority over the Archdiocese of Gniezno and, by default, the entirety of the Polish church. As a result, the Polish prelates swore fealty to the antipope.

In August 1135, in exchange for the independence of the Polish episcopate, Bolesław III Wrymouth, Duke of Poland, declared himself a vassal of Emperor Lothair and agreed to pay tribute to the Holy Roman Empire. On July 7, 1136, Pope Innocent upheld the independence of the Polish church from the Archdiocese of Magdeburg in a papal bull entitled Ex commisso nobis.

== Later history ==
During World War II, the archdiocesan archives in Gniezno were plundered by Nazi Germany, and the bull, along with numerous other artefacts, were moved west towards Germany. The Nazis were intercepted by the Soviet Red Army, however, and the bull was taken to Moscow. The document remained in the Russian capital for fifty years before being returned to Gniezno.

Upon the document's return, the National Library of Poland performed a series of tests on the bull under the authority of Professor Andrzej Wyczański. The scientists discovered that when viewed under ultraviolet light, the document showed traces of different washed-out text. Due to the lack of adequate testing facilities, the library abandoned further research efforts, which have not been resumed since.

== See also ==
- Saint Norbert of Xanten
- Roman Catholic Archdiocese of Gniezno
- List of archbishops of Gniezno and primates of Poland
