= Kalisz Pomorski =

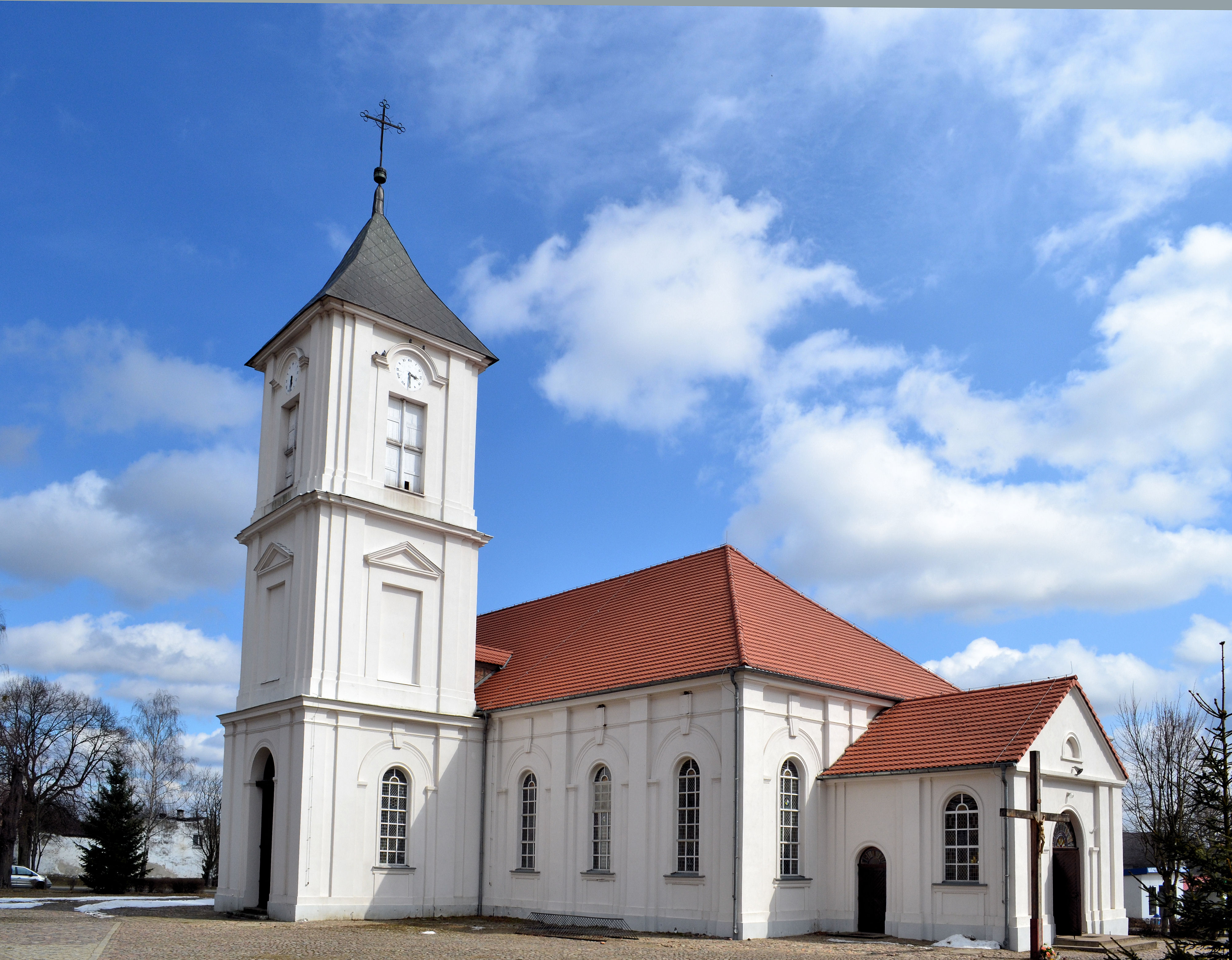
- Our Lady Queen of Poland church

- Flag Coat of arms

- Location within Poland
- Coordinates: 53°17′N 15°54′E
- Country: Poland
- Voivodeship: West Pomeranian
- County: Drawsko
- Gmina: Kalisz Pomorski

Area
  - Total: 11.89 km^{2} (4.59 sq mi)

Population (2006)
  - Total: 3,989
  - Density: 335.5/km^{2} (868.9/sq mi)
- Time zone: UTC+1 (CET)
  - Summer (DST): UTC+2 (CEST)
- Postal code: 78-540
- Area code: +48 94
- Website: http://www.kaliszpom.pl

Kalisz Pomorski [ˈkalʲiʂ pɔˈmɔrskʲi] (Latin: Nova Calisia; German: Kallies) is a town in Drawsko County in West Pomeranian Voivodeship in northwestern Poland with about 4,500 inhabitants.

== History ==
In the 8th century a Slavic gród existed in present-day Kalisz Pomorski. In the Middle Ages it was part of Poland, located in northern Greater Poland. The town's name derives from the city of Kalisz in southern Greater Poland. In order to develop this sparsely populated area, duke Przemysł I brought settlers from Kalisz to the settlement, which was newly named in Latin Nova Calisia (meaning New Kalisz).

It was part of the Kingdom of Prussia from the 18th century and between 1871 and 1945 the area was part of Germany. During World War II, in 1944–1945, the German administration operated a subcamp of the Ravensbrück concentration camp in the town, in which they imprisoned around 500–1,000 people at a time. Between 1871 and 1945 the area was part of Germany. After the defeat of Nazi Germany in World War II, it became again part of Poland.

== Gallery ==
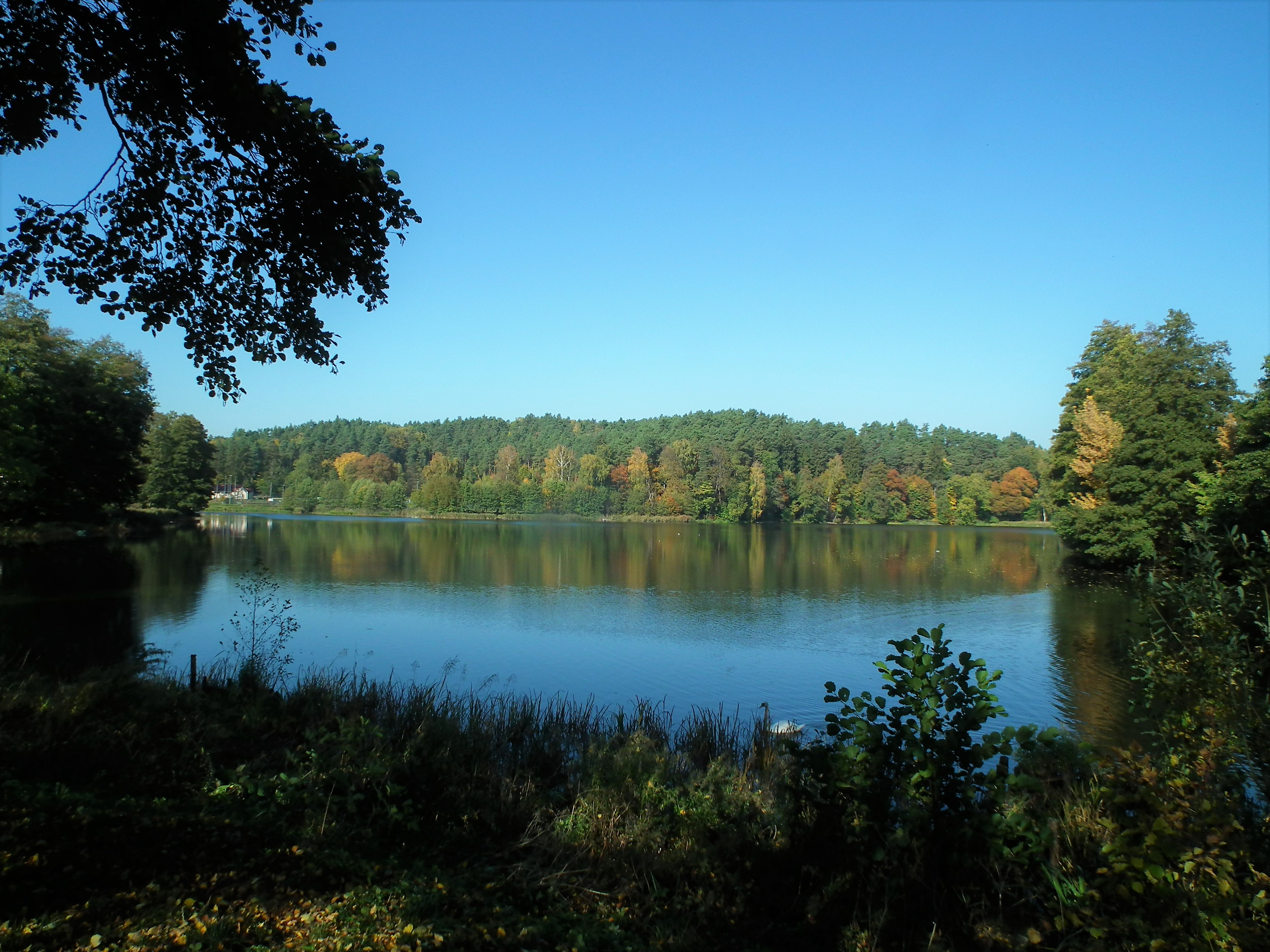
Młyńskie Lake

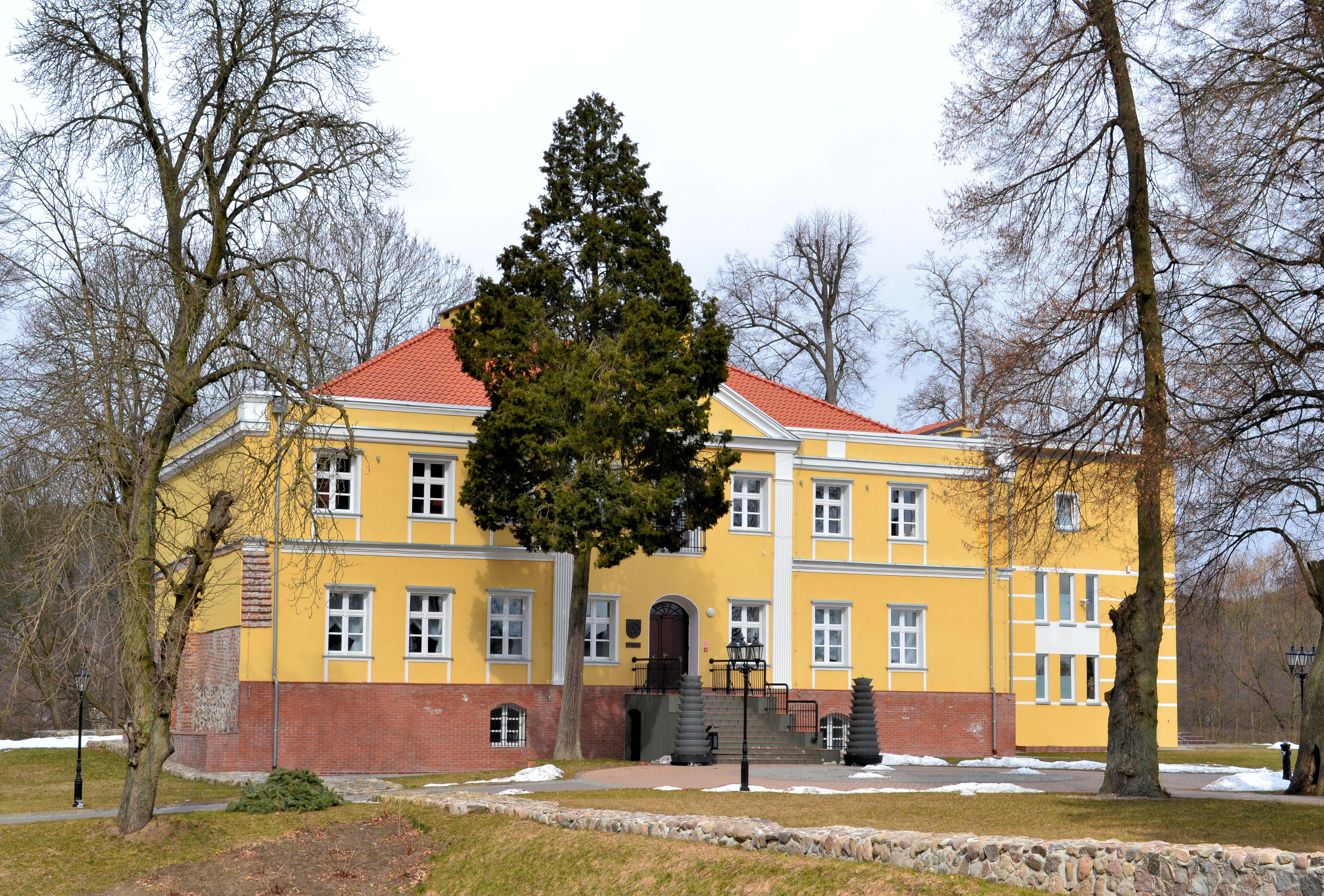
Palace in Kalisz Pomorski

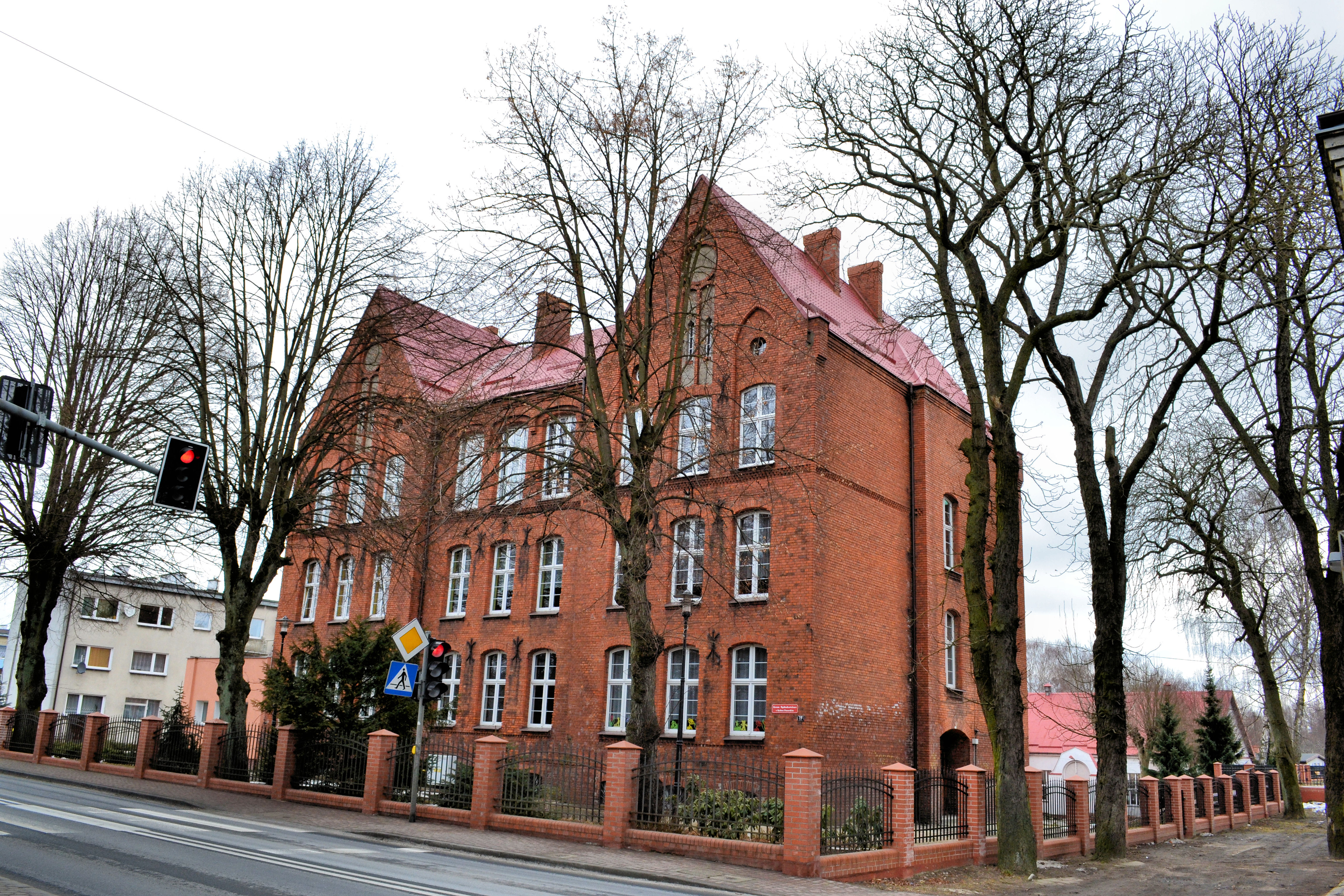
High school

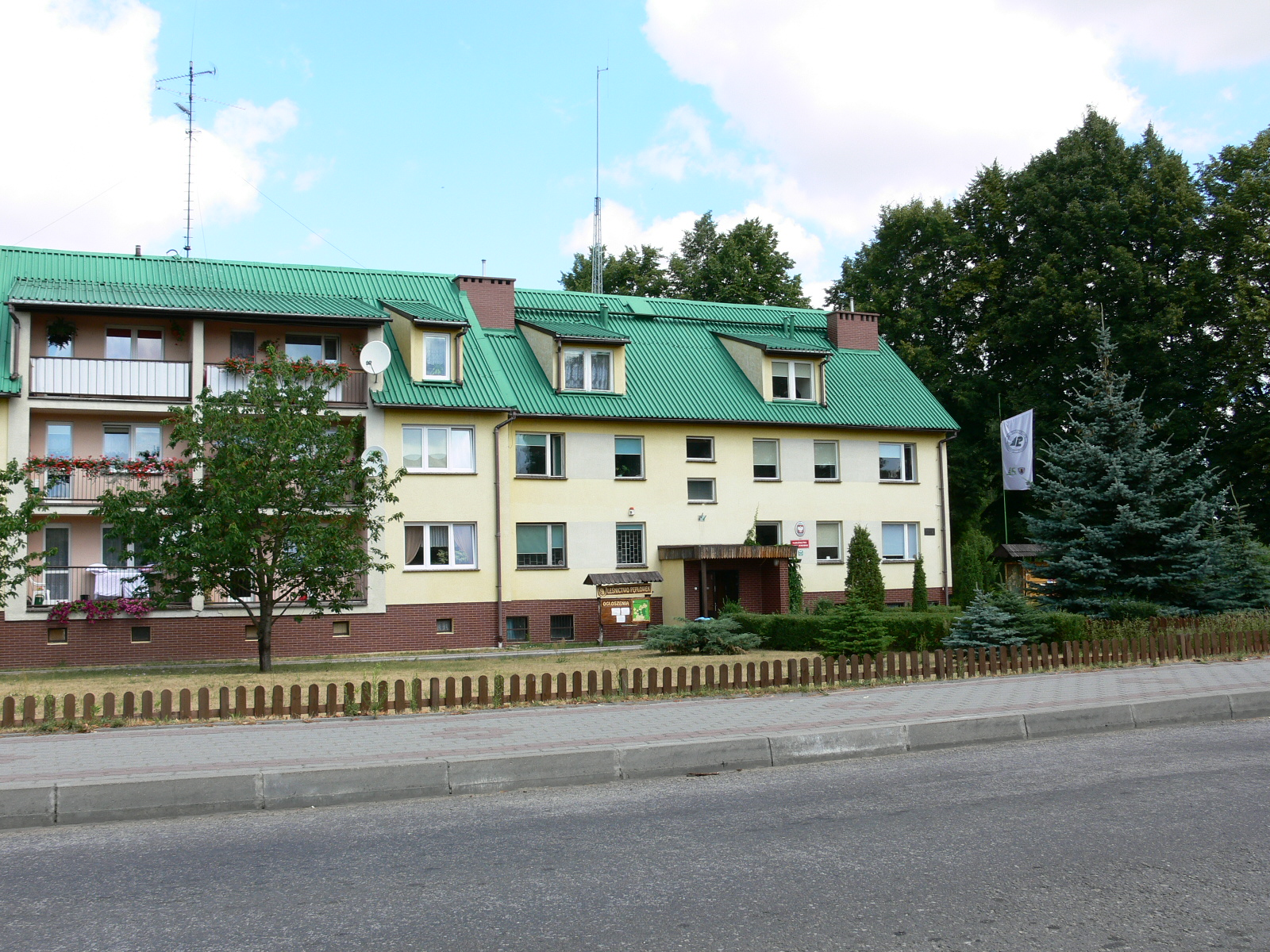
Forest office building

== Transport ==
Kalisz Pomorski lies on national road 10.

National road 10 connects Kalisz Pomorski to Szczecin to the west and to Piła to the east.

Kalisz Pomorski has a station on the Szczecin-Piła railway line.

== Notable residents ==
- Paul Sydow (1851 – 1925), German mycologist and lichenologist

== International relations ==
=== Twin towns — Sister cities ===
Kalisz Pomorski is twinned with:

- Kaltenkirchen, Germany
- Torgelow, Germany
- Putlitz, Germany
