= Drawsko Training Ground =

Training and proving ground in Poland

Colonel Franciszek Sadowski Land Forces Training Centre in Drawsko
- Centrum Szkolenia Wojsk Lądowych Drawsko im. płk. dypl. Franciszka Sadowskiego
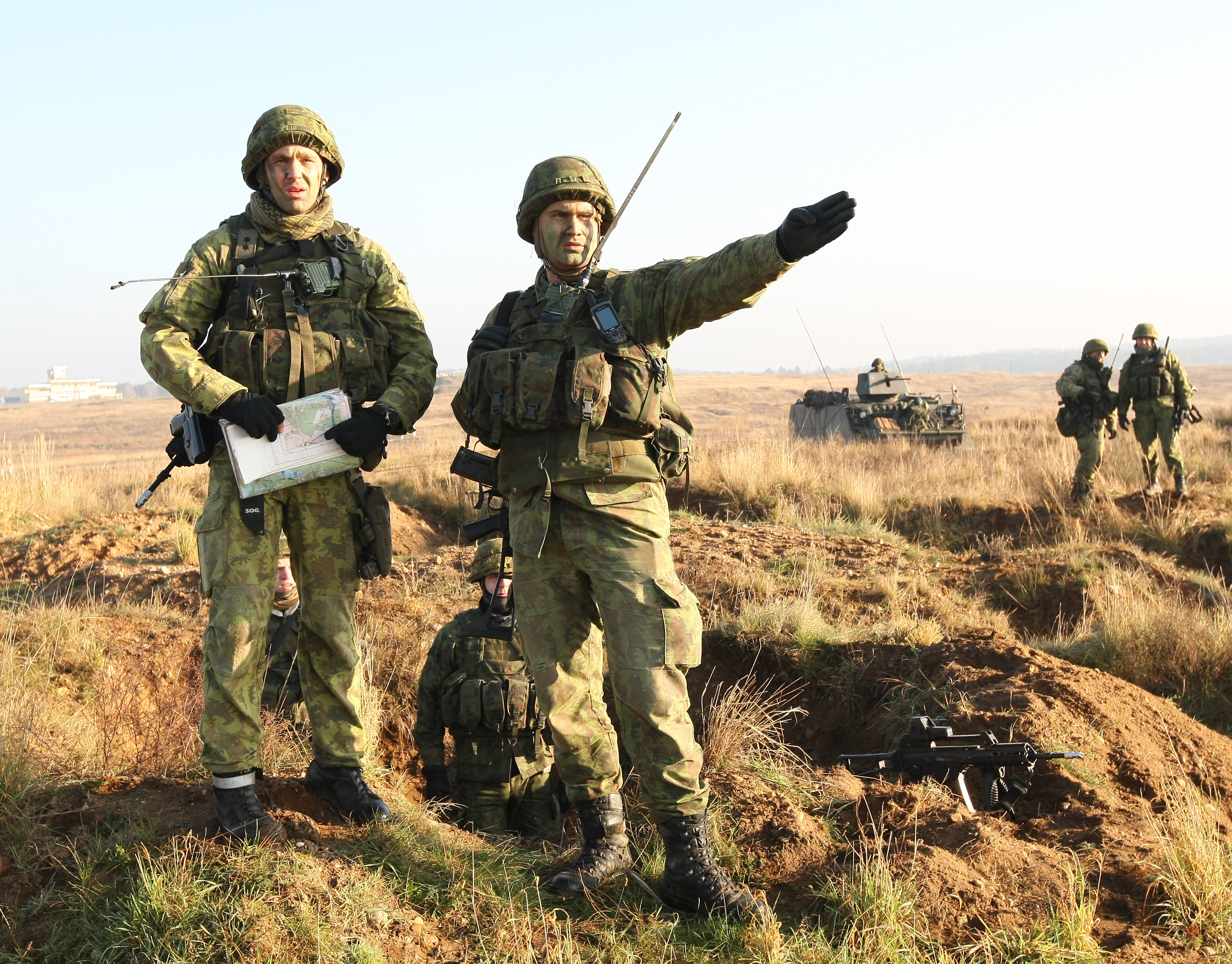
- Armed forces training (buildings in the distance), 2013
- Country: Poland
- Allegiance: Poland, NATO
- Branch: Polish Land Forces
- Type: Training and proving ground
- Size: 339.68 square kilometres (131.15 mi^{2})
- Garrison/HQ: Office in Oleszno, West Pomeranian Voivodeship
- Nickname: Poligon Drawski
- Patron: Franciszek Sadowski
- Anniversaries: 29 May
- Website: cswldrawsko.wp.mil.pl

Commanders
- Current commander: See § Commanders

Insignia

The Colonel Franciszek Sadowski Land Forces Training Centre in Drawsko (Polish: Centrum Szkolenia Wojsk Lądowych Drawsko im. płk. dypl. Franciszka Sadowskiego), commonly known as the Drawsko Training Ground (Polish: Poligon Drawski) is a training and proving ground located approximately 4 kilometres (2.5 mi) southwest of Drawsko Pomorskie, West Pomeranian Voivodeship. The training ground was called the Flugplatz Gabbert of the German Reichswehr. Aside from being used by the Polish Army, it is also used by all member states of NATO.

== History ==
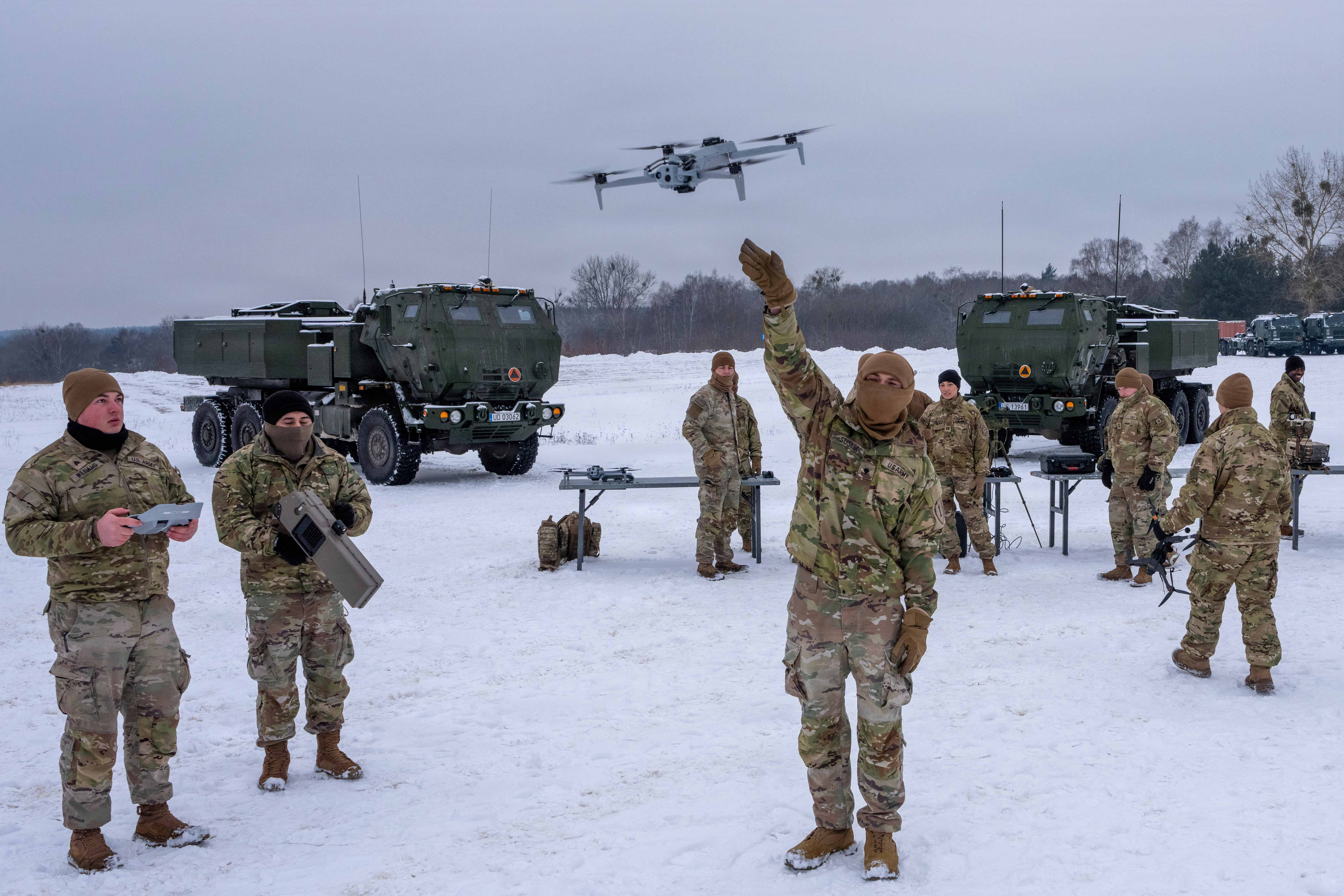
US Army 3rd Squadron, 2nd Cavalry Regiment operate a drone at Drawsko Combat Training Center, 13 January 2026

The unit originated in Jelenino, a village near Szczecinek and was created on 2 February 1946 as the Command of the Artillery Proving Ground (Polish: Komenda Poligonu Artyleryjnego). The unit was moved on 12 January 1949 to Oleszno, where it currently lies. The base was then changed to both a proving and training ground. Eventually, the name of the ground changed to the 2nd District Artillery Training Ground (Polish: II Okręgowy Poligon Artylerii).

Many military events happened and happen in the area, most notably "Odra - Nysa 69", "Tarcza 76" and "Tarcza 88". In October 2000, the V Corps of the United States participated in a field exercise codenamed "VICTORY STRIKE". More than 2 thousand soldiers participated in the event.

== Settlements located in the area ==
The training ground's area itself is located in Drawsko County, on the border of Gmina Kalisz Pomorski and Gmina Drawsko Pomorskie. The settlements on the area are:

- Gmina Kalisz Pomorski
  - Głębokie
  - Prostynia
  - Jaworze
  - Borowo
  - Czertyń
- Gmina Drawsko Pomorskie
  - Oleszno (headquarters)
  - Ziemsko
  - Żołędowo
  - Dzikowo
  - Konotop

== Commanders ==
The commanders of the area were and are:

- Maj. Ludomir Kościesza Wolski (1946–1950) (Note: Commanded the base in Jelenino from 1946 to 1949.)
- Lt. Col. Jan Sementz (1950–1962)
- Brig. Gen. Leon Dubicki (March–September 1962)
- Lt. Franciszek Raban (1962–1964)
- Brig. Gen. Józef Kolasa (1964–1966)
- Lt. Jan Bodylewicz (1966–1974)
- Lt. Franciszek Sadowski (1974–1979)
- Lt. Jan Matejuk (1988–1996)
- Lt. Jan Krupa (1996–1998)
- Lt. Robert Jabłoński (1998–2001)
- Lt. Antoni Budkowski (2001–2004)
- Lt. Michał Wałęza (2004–2010)
- COL (Colonel) Marek Gmurski (2010– Jan 2022)
- COL Andrzej Negmanski (Jan 2022–present)
