= Cieminko =

- Village
- Location within Poland
- Coordinates: 53°40′N 16°3′E
- Country: Poland
- Voivodeship: West Pomeranian
- County: Drawsko
- Gmina: Ostrowice

Cieminko [t͡ɕɛˈminkɔ] (formerly German Zemmin) is a village in the administrative district of Gmina Ostrowice, within Drawsko County, West Pomeranian Voivodeship, in north-western Poland. It lies approximately 6 km (4 mi) north-east of Ostrowice, 23 km (14 mi) north-east of Drawsko Pomorskie, and 101 km (63 mi) east of the regional capital Szczecin.

Before 1772 the area was part of Kingdom of Poland, 1772-1945 Prussia and Germany. For more on its history, see Drahim County and History of Pomerania.
