= Chlebowo, Drawsko County =

Chlebowo
- Village
- Location within Poland
- Coordinates: 53°38′N 16°2′E
- Country: Poland
- Voivodeship: West Pomeranian
- County: Drawsko
- Gmina: Ostrowice
- Population (approx.): 160

Chlebowo [xlɛˈbɔvɔ] is a village in the administrative district of Gmina Ostrowice, within Drawsko County, West Pomeranian Voivodeship, in north-western Poland. It lies approximately 4 km (2 mi) east of Ostrowice, 19 km (12 mi) north-east of Drawsko Pomorskie, and 99 km (62 mi) east of the regional capital Szczecin.

For the history of the region, see History of Pomerania.
