= Kiełpin, West Pomeranian Voivodeship =

Kiełpin
- Settlement
- Location within Poland
- Coordinates: 53°37′13″N 15°54′24″E
- Country: Poland
- Voivodeship: West Pomeranian
- County: Drawsko
- Gmina: Ostrowice

Kiełpin [ˈkʲɛu̯pin] (German: Kölpin) is a settlement in the administrative district of Gmina Ostrowice, within Drawsko County, West Pomeranian Voivodeship, in north-western Poland. It lies approximately 5 km (3 mi) south-west of Ostrowice, 12 km (7 mi) north-east of Drawsko Pomorskie, and 91 km (57 mi) east of the regional capital Szczecin.

For the history of the region, see History of Pomerania.
