= Donatowo, West Pomeranian Voivodeship =

Donatowo
- Village
- Location within Poland
- Coordinates: 53°39′5″N 15°56′23″E
- Country: Poland
- Voivodeship: West Pomeranian
- County: Drawsko
- Gmina: Ostrowice
- Population: 50

Donatowo [dɔnaˈtɔvɔ] (German: Dohnafelde) is a village in the administrative district of Gmina Ostrowice, within Drawsko County, West Pomeranian Voivodeship, in north-western Poland. It lies approximately 3 km (2 mi) north-west of Ostrowice, 17 km (11 mi) north-east of Drawsko Pomorskie, and 94 km (58 mi) east of the regional capital Szczecin.

For the history of the region, see History of Pomerania.

The village has a population of 50.
