= Szczycienko =

- Village
- Location within Poland
- Coordinates: 53°38′N 16°0′E
- Country: Poland
- Voivodeship: West Pomeranian
- County: Drawsko
- Gmina: Ostrowice

Szczycienko [ʂt͡ʂɨˈt͡ɕɛnkɔ] (formerly German Klein Schönberg) is a village in the administrative district of Gmina Ostrowice, within Drawsko County, West Pomeranian Voivodeship, in north-western Poland. It lies approximately 2 km (1 mi) east of Ostrowice, 18 km (11 mi) north-east of Drawsko Pomorskie, and 97 km (60 mi) east of the regional capital Szczecin.

For the history of the region, see History of Pomerania.
