= Węglin, West Pomeranian Voivodeship =

Węglin
- Settlement
- Location within Poland
- Coordinates: 53°36′9″N 15°51′43″E
- Country: Poland
- Voivodeship: West Pomeranian
- County: Drawsko
- Gmina: Ostrowice

Węglin [ˈvɛnɡlin] (German: Sabinenhof) is a settlement in the administrative district of Gmina Ostrowice, within Drawsko County, West Pomeranian Voivodeship, in north-western Poland. It lies approximately 9 km (6 mi) south-west of Ostrowice, 9 km (6 mi) north-east of Drawsko Pomorskie, and 88 km (55 mi) east of the regional capital Szczecin.

For the history of the region, see History of Pomerania.
