= Nowe Worowo =

- Village
- Location within Poland
- Coordinates: 53°39′N 16°5′E
- Country: Poland
- Voivodeship: West Pomeranian
- County: Drawsko
- Gmina: Ostrowice

Nowe Worowo [ˈnɔvɛ vɔˈrɔvɔ] is a village in the administrative district of Gmina Ostrowice, within Drawsko County, West Pomeranian Voivodeship, in north-western Poland. It lies approximately 8 km (5 mi) east of Ostrowice, 23 km (14 mi) north-east of Drawsko Pomorskie, and 103 km (64 mi) east of the regional capital Szczecin.

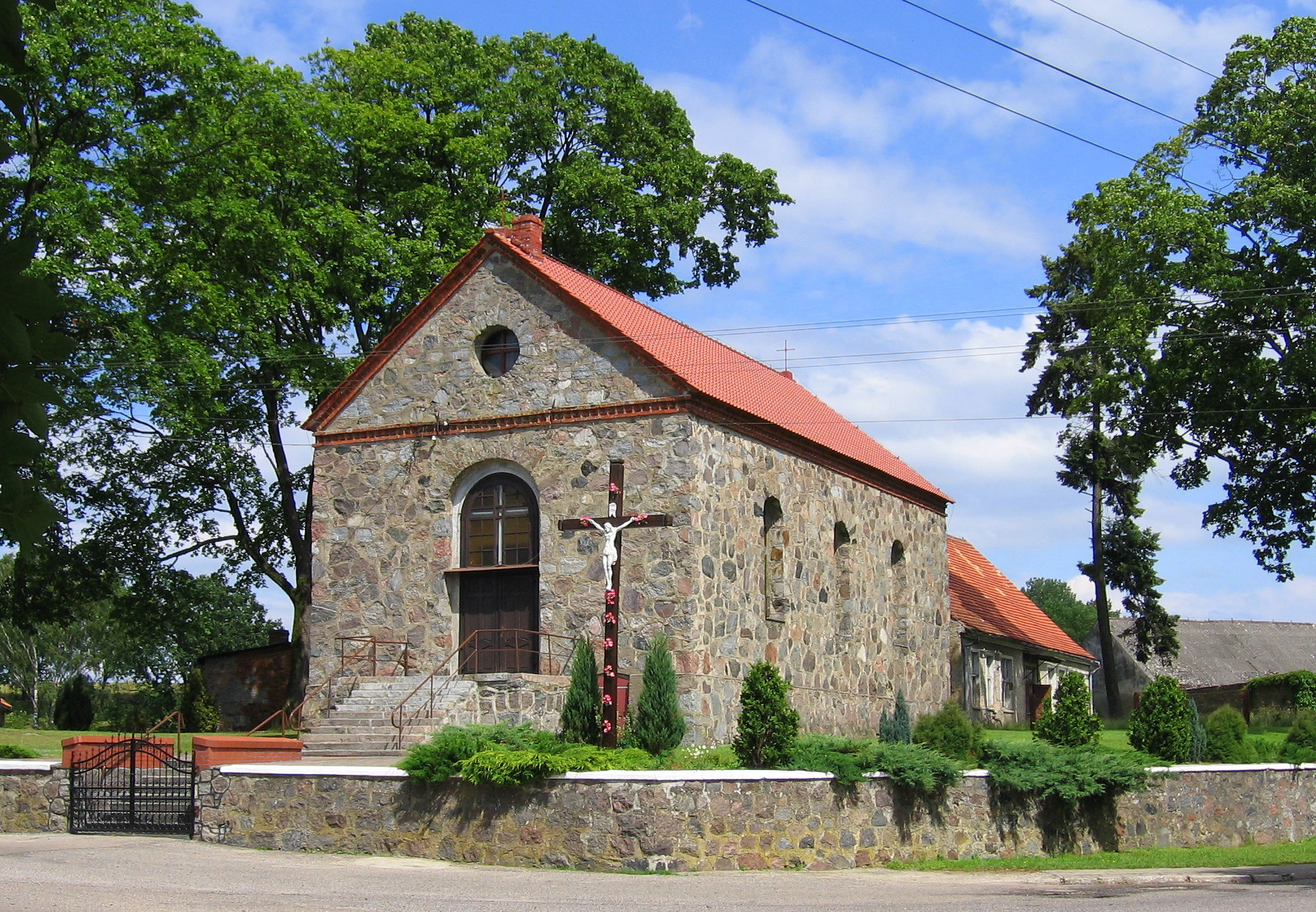
Roman Catholic Church
