= Siecino =

- Village
- Location within Poland
- Coordinates: 53°36′N 16°0′E
- Country: Poland
- Voivodeship: West Pomeranian
- County: Drawsko
- Gmina: Ostrowice

Siecino [ɕɛˈt͡ɕinɔ] (formerly German Zetzin) is a village in the administrative district of Gmina Ostrowice, within Drawsko County, West Pomeranian Voivodeship, in north-western Poland. It lies approximately 5 km (3 mi) south of Ostrowice, 16 km (10 mi) north-east of Drawsko Pomorskie, and 96 km (60 mi) east of the regional capital Szczecin.

For the history of the region, see History of Pomerania.
