= Przytoń, Drawsko County =

Przytoń
- Village
- Location within Poland
- Coordinates: 53°37′N 15°53′E
- Country: Poland
- Voivodeship: West Pomeranian
- County: Drawsko
- Gmina: Ostrowice
- Time zone: UTC+1 (CET)
  - Summer (DST): UTC+2 (CEST)
- Vehicle registration: ZDR

Przytoń [ˈpʂɨtɔɲ] is a village located in the administrative district of Gmina Ostrowice, within Drawsko County, West Pomeranian Voivodeship, in north-western Poland. It lies approximately 7 km (4 mi) west of Ostrowice, 11 km (7 mi) north-east of Drawsko Pomorskie, and 89 km (55 mi) east of the regional capital Szczecin.
