= Jutrosin, West Pomeranian Voivodeship =

Jutrosin
- Settlement
- Location within Poland
- Coordinates: 53°38′39″N 15°54′40″E
- Country: Poland
- Voivodeship: West Pomeranian
- County: Drawsko
- Gmina: Ostrowice

Jutrosin [juˈtrɔɕin] (German: Morgenland) is a settlement in the administrative district of Gmina Ostrowice, within Drawsko County, West Pomeranian Voivodeship, in north-western Poland. It lies approximately 5 km (3 mi) west of Ostrowice, 15 km (9 mi) north-east of Drawsko Pomorskie, and 92 km (57 mi) east of the regional capital Szczecin.

For the history of the region, see History of Pomerania.
