= Karpno, Drawsko County =

Karpno
- Village
- Location within Poland
- Coordinates: 53°38′39″N 15°53′9″E
- Country: Poland
- Voivodeship: West Pomeranian
- County: Drawsko
- Gmina: Ostrowice
- Population: 10

Karpno [ˈkarpnɔ] (German: Karpen) is a village in the administrative district of Gmina Ostrowice, within Drawsko County, West Pomeranian Voivodeship, in north-western Poland. It lies approximately 6 km (4 mi) west of Ostrowice, 14 km (9 mi) north-east of Drawsko Pomorskie, and 90 km (56 mi) east of the regional capital Szczecin.

For the history of the region, see History of Pomerania.

The village has a population of 10.
