= Przystanek, West Pomeranian Voivodeship =

Przystanek
- Settlement
- Location within Poland
- Coordinates: 53°37′44″N 15°54′44″E
- Country: Poland
- Voivodeship: West Pomeranian
- County: Drawsko
- Gmina: Ostrowice

Przystanek [pʂɨsˈtanɛk] (German: Neu Pritten) is a settlement in the administrative district of Gmina Ostrowice, within Drawsko County, West Pomeranian Voivodeship, in north-western Poland. It lies approximately 5 km (3 mi) west of Ostrowice, 13 km (8 mi) north-east of Drawsko Pomorskie, and 92 km (57 mi) east of the regional capital Szczecin.

For the history of the region, see History of Pomerania.
