= Kania Górka =

Kania Górka, Poland
- Settlement
- Location within Poland
- Coordinates: 53°39′15″N 16°8′13″E
- Country: Poland
- Voivodeship: West Pomeranian
- County: Drawsko
- Gmina: Ostrowice

Kania Górka [ˈkaɲa ˈɡurka] (German: Kannenwinkel) is a settlement in the administrative district of Gmina Ostrowice, within Drawsko County, West Pomeranian Voivodeship, in north-western Poland. It lies approximately 11 km (7 mi) east of Ostrowice, 26 km (16 mi) north-east of Drawsko Pomorskie, and 107 km (66 mi) east of the regional capital Szczecin.

For the history of the region, see History of Pomerania.
