= Grabinek, West Pomeranian Voivodeship =

Grabinek
- Village
- Location within Poland
- Coordinates: 53°39′24″N 16°9′5″E
- Country: Poland
- Voivodeship: West Pomeranian
- County: Drawsko
- Gmina: Ostrowice
- Population: 20

Grabinek [ɡraˈbinɛk] (German: Gräwinsberg) is a village in the administrative district of Gmina Ostrowice, within Drawsko County, West Pomeranian Voivodeship, in north-western Poland. It lies approximately 12 km (7 mi) east of Ostrowice, 27 km (17 mi) north-east of Drawsko Pomorskie, and 108 km (67 mi) east of the regional capital Szczecin.

For the history of the region, see History of Pomerania.

The village has a population of 20.
