= Śmidzięcino =

- Settlement
- Location within Poland
- Coordinates: 53°40′N 16°8′E
- Country: Poland
- Voivodeship: West Pomeranian
- County: Drawsko
- Gmina: Ostrowice

Śmidzięcino [ɕmid͡ʑɛnˈt͡ɕinɔ] (German: Schmidtenthin) is a settlement in the administrative district of Gmina Ostrowice, within Drawsko County, West Pomeranian Voivodeship, in north-western Poland. It lies approximately 11 km (7 mi) east of Ostrowice, 27 km (17 mi) north-east of Drawsko Pomorskie, and 107 km (66 mi) east of the regional capital Szczecin.

For the history of the region, see History of Pomerania.
