= Smołdzęcino =

- Village
- Location within Poland
- Coordinates: 53°41′15″N 16°5′14″E
- Country: Poland
- Voivodeship: West Pomeranian
- County: Drawsko
- Gmina: Ostrowice

Smołdzęcino [smɔu̯d͡zɛnˈt͡ɕinɔ] (German: Schmalzenthin) is a village in the administrative district of Gmina Ostrowice, within Drawsko County, West Pomeranian Voivodeship, in north-western Poland. It lies approximately 10 km (6 mi) north-east of Ostrowice, 26 km (16 mi) north-east of Drawsko Pomorskie, and 104 km (65 mi) east of the regional capital Szczecin.

For the history of the region, see History of Pomerania.
