= Gronowo, West Pomeranian Voivodeship =

Gronowo
- Village
- Location within Poland
- Coordinates: 53°35′N 15°57′E
- Country: Poland
- Voivodeship: West Pomeranian
- County: Drawsko
- Gmina: Ostrowice

Gronowo [ɡrɔˈnɔvɔ] (formerly German Groß Grünow) is a village in the administrative district of gmina Złocieniec, within Drawsko County, West Pomeranian Voivodeship, in north-western Poland. It lies approximately 7 km (4 mi) south of Ostrowice, 12 km (7 mi) north-east of Drawsko Pomorskie, and 93 km (58 mi) east of the regional capital Szczecin.

For the history of the region, see History of Pomerania.
