= Tęczyn, West Pomeranian Voivodeship =

Tęczyn
- Settlement
- Location within Poland
- Coordinates: 53°37′N 15°51′E
- Country: Poland
- Voivodeship: West Pomeranian
- County: Drawsko
- Gmina: Ostrowice

Tęczyn [ˈtɛnt͡ʂɨn] is a settlement in the administrative district of Gmina Ostrowice, within Drawsko County, West Pomeranian Voivodeship, in north-western Poland. It lies approximately 9 km (6 mi) west of Ostrowice, 10 km (6 mi) north of Drawsko Pomorskie, and 87 km (54 mi) east of the regional capital Szczecin.

For the history of the region, see History of Pomerania.
