= Szczytniki, Drawsko County =

Szczytniki
- Settlement
- Location within Poland
- Coordinates: 53°39′N 15°59′E
- Country: Poland
- Voivodeship: West Pomeranian
- County: Drawsko
- Gmina: Ostrowice

Szczytniki [ʂt͡ʂɨtˈniki] (German: Groß Schönberg) is a settlement in the administrative district of Gmina Ostrowice, within Drawsko County, West Pomeranian Voivodeship, in north-western Poland. It lies approximately 2 km (1 mi) north-east of Ostrowice, 18 km (11 mi) north-east of Drawsko Pomorskie, and 97 km (60 mi) east of the regional capital Szczecin.

== See also ==
- History of Pomerania
