= Łabędzie, West Pomeranian Voivodeship =

Łabędzie
- Village
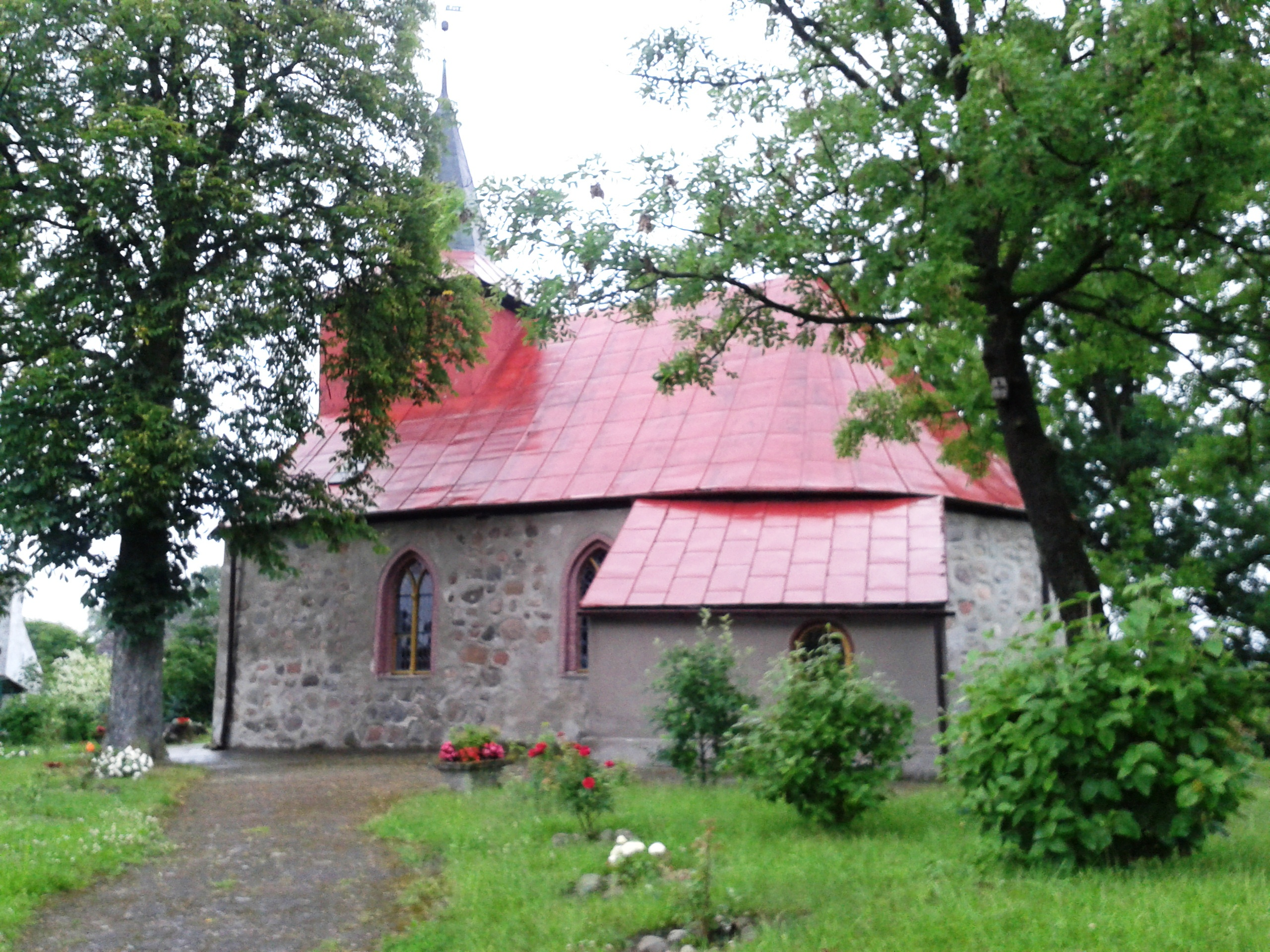
- Church of Saint Archangel Michael

- Location within Poland
- Coordinates: 53°39′14″N 15°48′22″E
- Country: Poland
- Voivodeship: West Pomeranian
- County: Drawsko
- Gmina: Drawsko Pomorskie

Łabędzie [waˈbɛnd͡ʑɛ] (German: Labenz) is a village in the administrative district of Gmina Drawsko Pomorskie, within Drawsko County, West Pomeranian Voivodeship, in north-western Poland. It lies approximately 12 km (7 mi) north of Drawsko Pomorskie and 85 km (53 mi) east of the regional capital Szczecin.

For the history of the region, see History of Pomerania.
