= Gmina Ostrowice =

Gmina Ostrowice Ostrowice Commune
- Gmina
- Coat of arms
- Interactive map of Gmina Ostrowice
- Coordinates (Ostrowice): 53°38′17″N 15°58′26″E
- Country: Poland
- Voivodeship: West Pomeranian
- County: Drawsko
- Seat: Ostrowice

Area
  - Total: 150.42 km^{2} (58.08 sq mi)

Population (2006)
  - Total: 2,531
  - Density: 16.83/km^{2} (43.58/sq mi)
- Website: http://www.ostrowice.pl/

Gmina Ostrowice was a rural gmina (administrative district) in Drawsko County, West Pomeranian Voivodeship, in north-western Poland. Its seat was the village of Ostrowice, which lies approximately 17 kilometres (11 mi) north-east of Drawsko Pomorskie and 96 km (60 mi) east of the regional capital Szczecin.

The gmina covered an area of 150.42 square kilometres (58.1 sq mi), and as of 2006 its total population was 2,531.

The gmina contained part of the protected area called Drawsko Landscape Park.

As a result of severe debt and bankruptcy, the gmina was dissolved and its territory divided between Gmina Drawsko Pomorskie and Gmina Złocieniec on January 1, 2019, being the first such case in Poland.

== Villages ==
Gmina Ostrowice contained the villages and settlements of Bolegorzyn, Borne, Chlebowo, Cieminko, Dołgie, Donatowo, Drzeńsko, Grabinek, Gronowo, Grzybno, Jelenino, Jutrosin, Kania Górka, Karpno, Kiełpin, Kleszczno, Kołatka, Kolno, Kosobądź, Marysin, Miłobądź, Nowe Worowo, Ostrowice, Płocie, Przystanek, Przytoń, Siecino, Śmidzięcino, Smołdzęcino, Śródlesie, Szczycienko, Szczytniki, Tęczyn, Węglin and Wiercienko.

== Neighbouring gminas ==
Gmina Ostrowice was bordered by the gminas of Brzeżno, Czaplinek, Drawsko Pomorskie, Połczyn-Zdrój, Świdwin and Złocieniec.
