= Dołgie, Drawsko County =

Dołgie
- Village
- Location within Poland
- Coordinates: 53°36′7″N 15°53′57″E
- Country: Poland
- Voivodeship: West Pomeranian
- County: Drawsko
- Gmina: Ostrowice

Dołgie [ˈdɔu̯ɡʲɛ] (formerly German: Dolgen) is a village in the administrative district of Gmina Ostrowice, within Drawsko County, West Pomeranian Voivodeship, in north-western Poland. It lies approximately 7 km (4 mi) south-west of Ostrowice, 11 km (7 mi) north-east of Drawsko Pomorskie, and 90 km (56 mi) east of the regional capital Szczecin.

For the history of the region, see History of Pomerania.
