= Zarańsko =

- Village
- Location within Poland
- Coordinates: 53°34′N 15°50′E
- Country: Poland
- Voivodeship: West Pomeranian
- County: Drawsko
- Gmina: Drawsko Pomorskie

Zarańsko [zaˈraɲskɔ] (German: Sarranzig) is a town in the administrative district of Gmina Drawsko Pomorskie, within Drawsko County, West Pomeranian Voivodeship, in north-western Poland. It lies approximately 5 km (3 mi) north-east of Drawsko Pomorskie and 85 km (53 mi) east of the regional capital Szczecin.

For the history of the region, see History of Pomerania.
