= Roztoki, West Pomeranian Voivodeship =

Roztoki
- Settlement
- Location within Poland
- Coordinates: 53°34′40″N 15°48′46″E
- Country: Poland
- Voivodeship: West Pomeranian
- County: Drawsko
- Gmina: Drawsko Pomorskie

Roztoki [rɔsˈtɔki] (German: Wedellshof) is a settlement in the administrative district of Gmina Drawsko Pomorskie, within Drawsko County, West Pomeranian Voivodeship, in north-western Poland. It lies approximately 6 km (4 mi) north of Drawsko Pomorskie and 84 km (52 mi) east of the regional capital Szczecin.

For the history of the region, see History of Pomerania.
