= Golina (disambiguation) =

Golina may refer to the following places in Poland:

- Golina, a town in Greater Poland Voivodeship (central Poland)
- Golina, Lower Silesian Voivodeship (south-west Poland)
- Golina, Jarocin County in Greater Poland Voivodeship (west-central Poland)
- Golina, Drawsko County in West Pomeranian Voivodeship (north-west Poland)
- Golina, Stargard County in West Pomeranian Voivodeship (north-west Poland)
