= Jelenino, Drawsko County =

Jelenino
- Village
- Location within Poland
- Coordinates: 53°39′N 15°57′E
- Country: Poland
- Voivodeship: West Pomeranian
- County: Drawsko
- Gmina: Ostrowice
- Population (approx.): 170

Jelenino [jɛlɛˈninɔ] (formerly German Annaberg) is a village in the administrative district of Gmina Ostrowice, within Drawsko County, West Pomeranian Voivodeship, in north-western Poland. It lies approximately 3 km (2 mi) north-west of Ostrowice, 17 km (11 mi) north-east of Drawsko Pomorskie, and 95 km (59 mi) east of the regional capital Szczecin.

For the history of the region, see History of Pomerania.

The village has an approximate population of 170.
