= Drzeńsko =

Drzeńsko may refer to the following places:

- Drzeńsko, Lubusz Voivodeship (west Poland)
- Drzeńsko, Drawsko County in West Pomeranian Voivodeship (north-west Poland)
- Drzeńsko, Sławno County in West Pomeranian Voivodeship (north-west Poland)
