= Karwice, Drawsko County =

Karwice
- Hamlet
- Location within Poland
- Coordinates: 53°27′31″N 15°52′34″E
- Country: Poland
- Voivodeship: West Pomeranian
- County: Drawsko
- Gmina: Drawsko Pomorskie
- Population: 20

Karwice [karˈvit͡sɛ] (German: Karwitz) is a hamlet in the administrative district of Gmina Drawsko Pomorskie, within Drawsko County, West Pomeranian Voivodeship, in north-western Poland. It lies approximately 10 km (6 mi) south-east of Drawsko Pomorskie and 86 km (53 mi) east of the regional capital Szczecin.

For the history of the region, see History of Pomerania.

The hamlet has a population of roughly 20.
