= Zbrojewo =

- Village
- Location within Poland
- Coordinates: 53°32′50″N 15°42′49″E
- Country: Poland
- Voivodeship: West Pomeranian
- County: Drawsko
- Gmina: Drawsko Pomorskie

Zbrojewo [zbrɔˈjɛvɔ] (German: Bernsdorf) is a village in the administrative district of Gmina Drawsko Pomorskie, within Drawsko County, West Pomeranian Voivodeship, in north-western Poland. It lies approximately 6 km (4 mi) west of Drawsko Pomorskie and 77 km (48 mi) east of the regional capital Szczecin.

For the history of the region, see History of Pomerania.
