= Jankowo, West Pomeranian Voivodeship =

Jankowo
- Village
- Location within Poland
- Coordinates: 53°30′N 15°45′E
- Country: Poland
- Voivodeship: West Pomeranian
- County: Drawsko
- Gmina: Drawsko Pomorskie
- Population (approx.): 500

Jankowo [janˈkɔvɔ] (German: Janikow) is a village in the administrative district of Gmina Drawsko Pomorskie, within Drawsko County, West Pomeranian Voivodeship, in north-western Poland. It lies approximately 5 km (3 mi) south-west of Drawsko Pomorskie and 78 km (48 mi) east of the regional capital Szczecin.

For the history of the region, see History of Pomerania.

The village has an approximate population of 500.
