= Kumki, Poland =

Kumki
- Village
- Location within Poland
- Coordinates: 53°32′29″N 15°43′37″E
- Country: Poland
- Voivodeship: West Pomeranian
- County: Drawsko
- Gmina: Drawsko Pomorskie
- Population: 50

Kumki [ˈkumki] (German: Kümken) is a village in the administrative district of Gmina Drawsko Pomorskie, within Drawsko County, West Pomeranian Voivodeship, in north-western Poland. It lies approximately 5 km (3 mi) west of Drawsko Pomorskie and 78 km (48 mi) east of the regional capital Szczecin.

For the history of the region, see History of Pomerania.

The village has a population of 50 people.
