= Grzybno, Drawsko County =

Grzybno
- Village
- Location within Poland
- Coordinates: 53°35′14″N 15°52′53″E
- Country: Poland
- Voivodeship: West Pomeranian
- County: Drawsko
- Gmina: Ostrowice
- Population: 10

Grzybno [ˈɡʐɨbnɔ] (German: Charlottenhof) is a village in the administrative district of Gmina Ostrowice, within Drawsko County, West Pomeranian Voivodeship, in north-western Poland. It lies approximately 9 km (6 mi) south-west of Ostrowice, 9 km (6 mi) north-east of Drawsko Pomorskie, and 89 km (55 mi) east of the regional capital Szczecin.

For the history of the region, see History of Pomerania.

The village has a population of 10.
