= Zagórki, West Pomeranian Voivodeship =

Zagórki
- Village
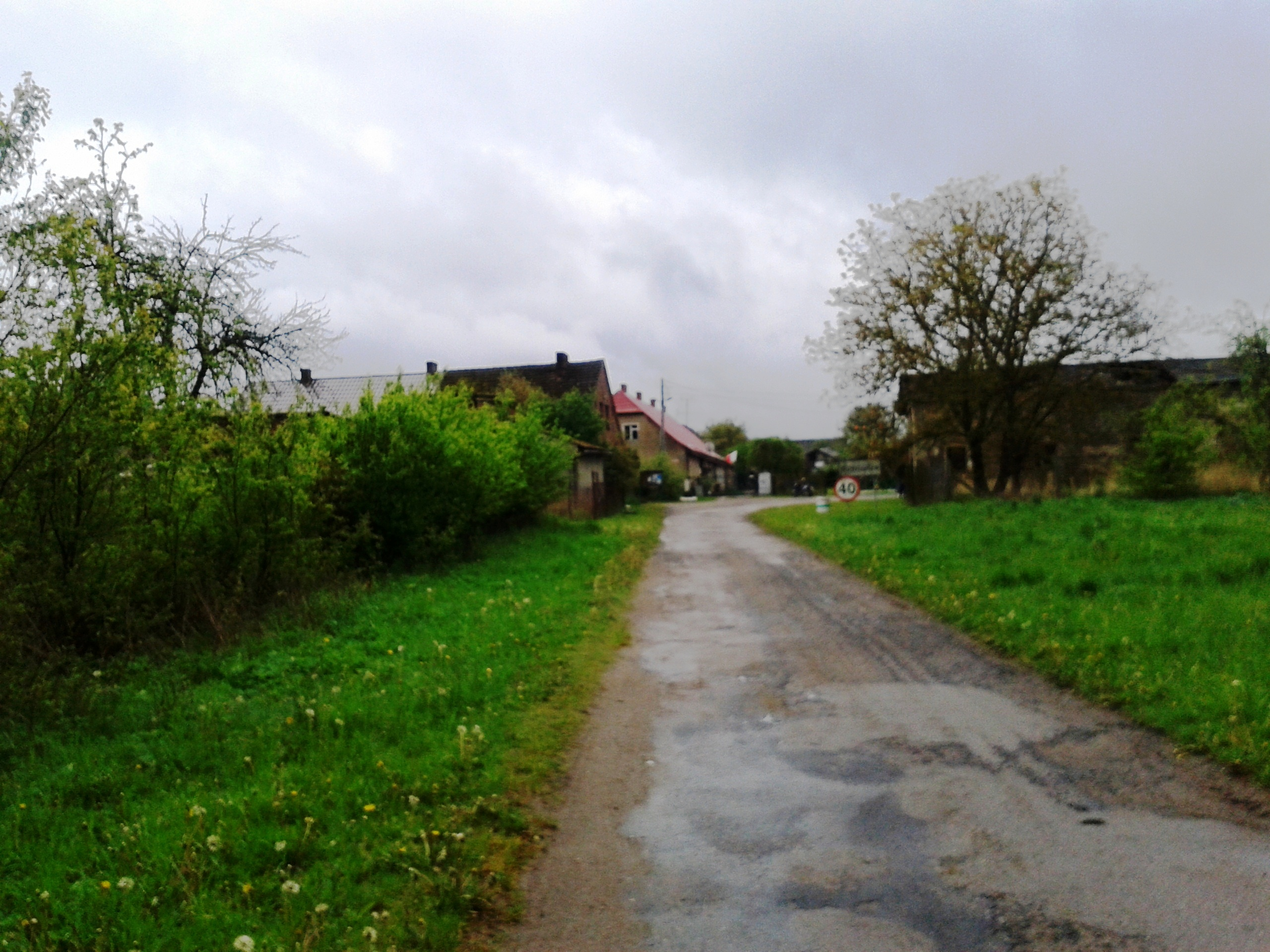
- Zagórki

- Location within Poland
- Coordinates: 53°31′18″N 15°51′12″E
- Country: Poland
- Voivodeship: West Pomeranian
- County: Drawsko
- Gmina: Drawsko Pomorskie
- Population: 60

Zagórki [zaˈɡurki] (German: Hünenberg) is a village in the administrative district of Gmina Drawsko Pomorskie, within Drawsko County, West Pomeranian Voivodeship, in north-western Poland. It lies approximately 4 km (2 mi) east of Drawsko Pomorskie and 85 km (53 mi) east of the regional capital Szczecin.

For the history of the region, see History of Pomerania.

The village has a population of 60.
