= Krzynno =

- Settlement
- Location within Poland
- Coordinates: 53°32′12″N 15°43′50″E
- Country: Poland
- Voivodeship: West Pomeranian
- County: Drawsko
- Gmina: Drawsko Pomorskie

Krzynno [ˈkʂɨnnɔ] is a settlement in the administrative district of Gmina Drawsko Pomorskie, within Drawsko County, West Pomeranian Voivodeship, in north-western Poland. It lies approximately 5 km (3 mi) west of Drawsko Pomorskie and 78 km (48 mi) east of the regional capital Szczecin.

For the history of the region, see History of Pomerania.
