= Suliszewo, Drawsko County =

Suliszewo
- Village
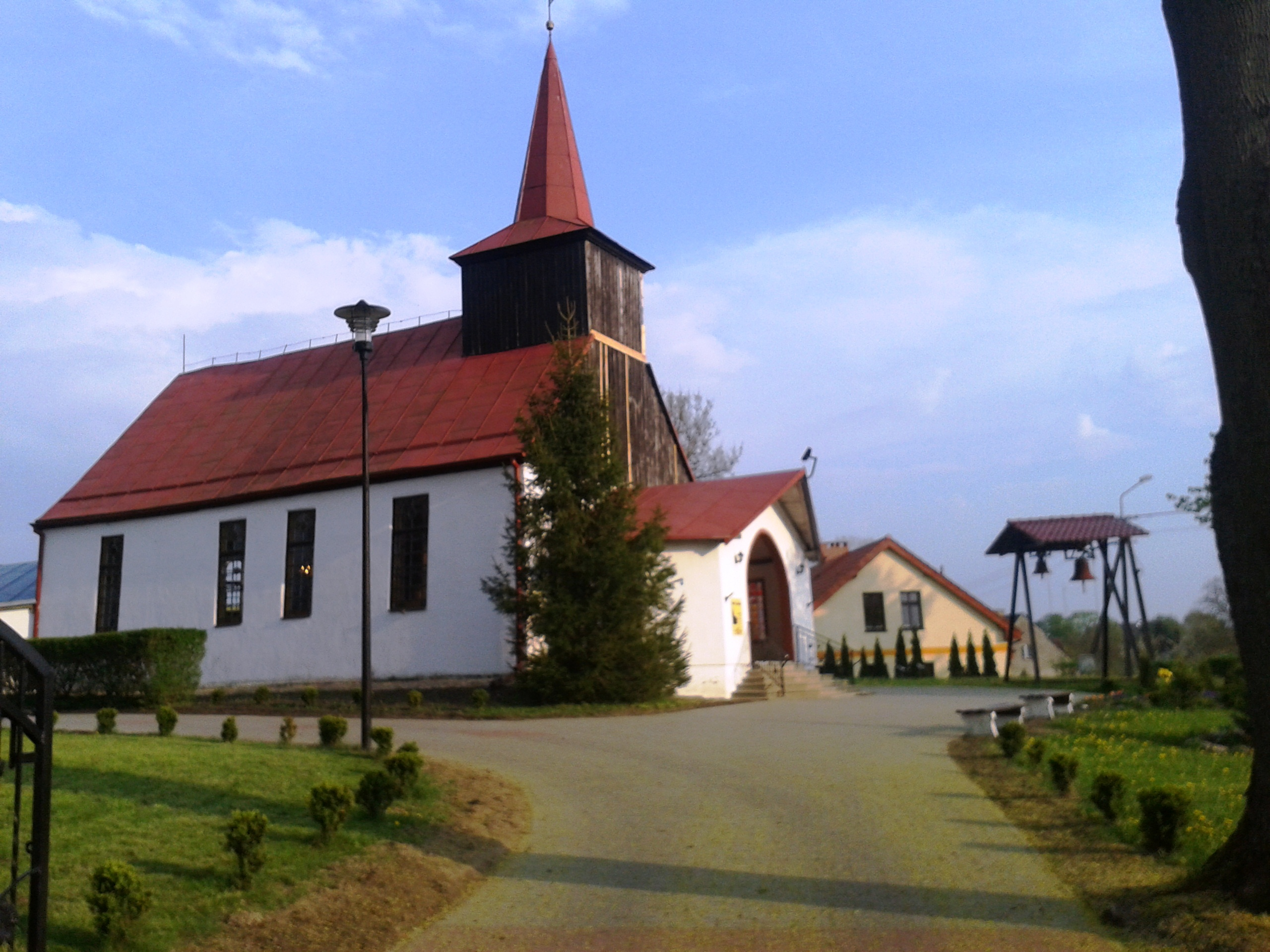
- Suliszewo - church

- Location within Poland
- Coordinates: 53°31′N 15°53′E
- Country: Poland
- Voivodeship: West Pomeranian
- County: Drawsko
- Gmina: Drawsko Pomorskie

Suliszewo [suliˈʂɛvɔ] (formerly German: Zülshagen) is a village in the administrative district of Gmina Drawsko Pomorskie, within Drawsko County, West Pomeranian Voivodeship, in north-western Poland. It lies approximately 6 km (4 mi) east of Drawsko Pomorskie and 87 km (54 mi) east of the regional capital Szczecin.

For the history of the region, see History of Pomerania.

== Notable residents ==
- Gerhard Giesen (1890–1945), Wehrmacht officer
