= Ustok =

- Village
- Location within Poland
- Coordinates: 53°33′23″N 15°44′38″E
- Country: Poland
- Voivodeship: West Pomeranian
- County: Drawsko
- Gmina: Drawsko Pomorskie
- Population: 18

Ustok [ˈustɔk] (German: Heinrichsfelde) is a village in the administrative district of Gmina Drawsko Pomorskie, within Drawsko County, West Pomeranian Voivodeship, in north-western Poland. It lies approximately 5 km (3 mi) north-west of Drawsko Pomorskie and 79 km (49 mi) east of the regional capital Szczecin.

For the history of the region, see History of Pomerania.

The village has a population of 18.
