= Gajewko =

- Village
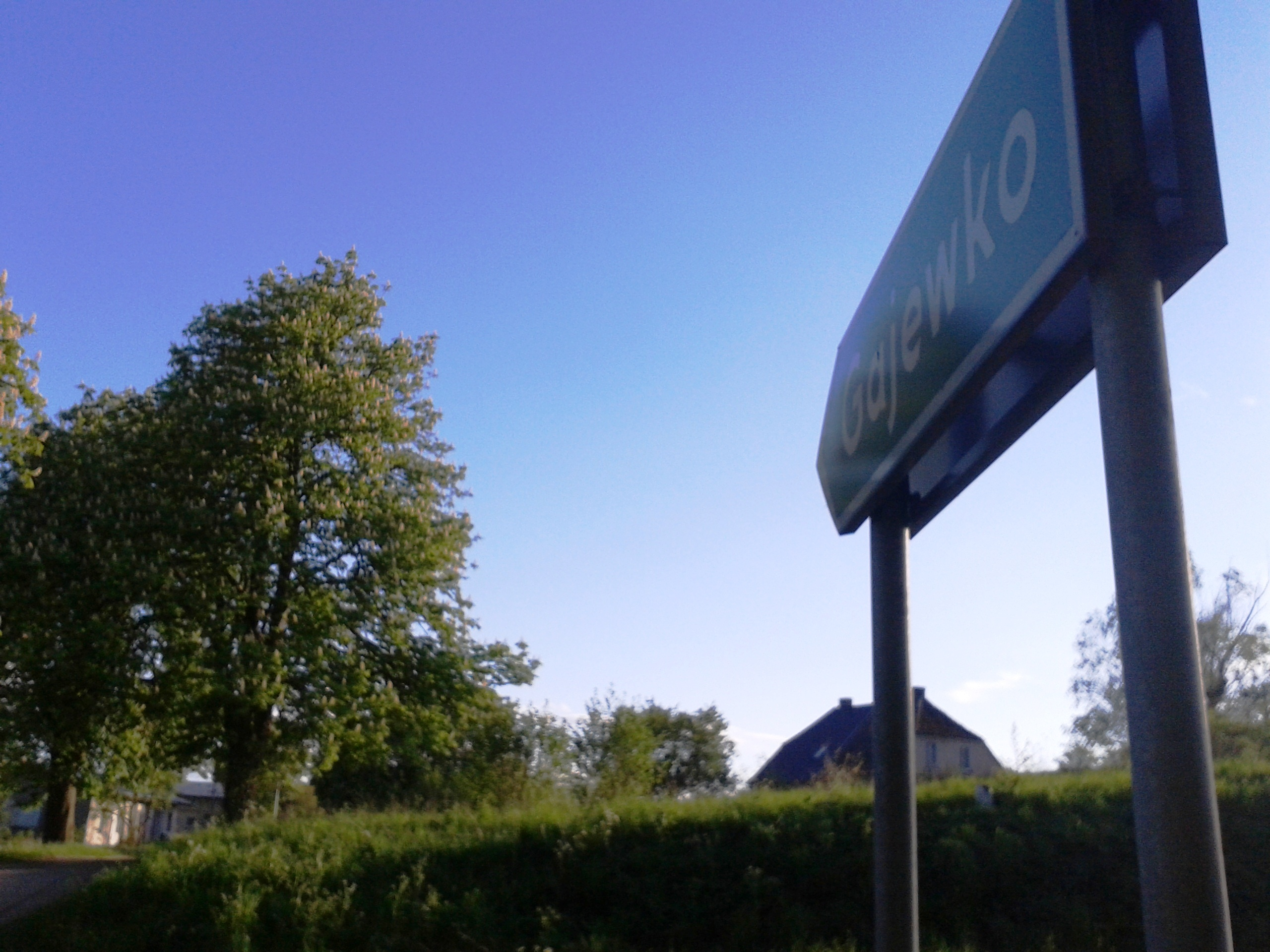
- Gajewko

- Location within Poland
- Coordinates: 53°33′46″N 15°45′48″E
- Country: Poland
- Voivodeship: West Pomeranian
- County: Drawsko
- Gmina: Drawsko Pomorskie
- Population: 40

Gajewko [ɡaˈjɛfkɔ] (German: Eichforst) is a village in the administrative district of Gmina Drawsko Pomorskie, within Drawsko County, West Pomeranian Voivodeship, in north-western Poland. It lies approximately 5 km (3 mi) north-west of Drawsko Pomorskie and 80 km (50 mi) east of the regional capital Szczecin.

For the history of the region, see History of Pomerania.

The village has a population of 40.
