= Gudowo =

- Village
- Location within Poland
- Coordinates: 53°29′N 15°52′E
- Country: Poland
- Voivodeship: West Pomeranian
- County: Drawsko
- Gmina: Drawsko Pomorskie
- Website: http://www.gudowo.go.pl/

Gudowo [ɡuˈdɔvɔ] (German: Baumgarten) is a village in the administrative district of Gmina Drawsko Pomorskie, within Drawsko County, West Pomeranian Voivodeship, in north-western Poland. It lies approximately 8 km (5 mi) south-east of Drawsko Pomorskie and 86 km (53 mi) east of the regional capital Szczecin.

For the history of the region, see History of Pomerania.
