= Linowno =

- Village
- Location within Poland
- Coordinates: 53°29′10″N 15°54′14″E
- Country: Poland
- Voivodeship: West Pomeranian
- County: Drawsko
- Gmina: Drawsko Pomorskie

Linowno [liˈnɔvnɔ] (German: Woltersdorf) is a village in the administrative district of Gmina Drawsko Pomorskie, within Drawsko County, West Pomeranian Voivodeship, in north-western Poland. It lies approximately 9 km (6 mi) south-east of Drawsko Pomorskie and 88 km (55 mi) east of the regional capital Szczecin.

For the history of the region, see History of Pomerania.
