= Cianowo =

- Settlement
- Location within Poland
- Coordinates: 53°34′N 15°43′E
- Country: Poland
- Voivodeship: West Pomeranian
- County: Drawsko
- Gmina: Drawsko Pomorskie

Cianowo [t͡ɕaˈnɔvɔ] (German: Jakobsdorf) is a settlement in the administrative district of Gmina Drawsko Pomorskie, within Drawsko County, West Pomeranian Voivodeship, in north-western Poland. It lies approximately 7 km (4 mi) north-west of Drawsko Pomorskie and 77 km (48 mi) east of the regional capital Szczecin.

For the history of the region, see History of Pomerania.
