= Dołgie =

Dołgie may refer to the following places:

- Dołgie, Drawsko County in West Pomeranian Voivodeship (north-west Poland)
- Dołgie, Gryfino County in West Pomeranian Voivodeship (north-west Poland)
- Dołgie, Szczecinek County in West Pomeranian Voivodeship (north-west Poland)
