= Kolno (disambiguation) =

Kolno may refer to the following places:

- Kolno, a town in Podlaskie Voivodeship (north-central Poland)
- Kolno, Kuyavian-Pomeranian Voivodeship (north-central Poland)
- Kolno, Wałcz County in West Pomeranian Voivodeship (north-west Poland)
- Kolno, Masovian Voivodeship (east-central Poland)
- Kolno, Konin County in Greater Poland Voivodeship (west-central Poland)
- Kolno, Międzychód County in Greater Poland Voivodeship (west-central Poland)
- Kolno, Warmian-Masurian Voivodeship (north Poland)
- Kolno, Drawsko County in West Pomeranian Voivodeship (north-west Poland)
- Kolno, a village in Zhytkavichy Raion of Gomel Region (Belarus)

== See also ==
- SS Kolno, a Polish cargo ship in service 1947-71
