= Olchowiec, West Pomeranian Voivodeship =

Olchowiec
- Village
- Location within Poland
- Coordinates: 53°35′21″N 15°47′54″E
- Country: Poland
- Voivodeship: West Pomeranian
- County: Drawsko
- Gmina: Drawsko Pomorskie
- Population: 10

Olchowiec [ɔlˈxɔvjɛt͡s] (German: Aalkist) is a village in the administrative district of Gmina Drawsko Pomorskie, within Drawsko County, West Pomeranian Voivodeship, in north-western Poland. It lies approximately 7 km (4 mi) north of Drawsko Pomorskie and 83 km (52 mi) east of the regional capital Szczecin.

For the history of the region, see History of Pomerania.

The village has a population of 10.
