= Dalewo =

Dalewo may refer to the following places:

- Dalewo, Greater Poland Voivodeship (west-central Poland)
- Dalewo, Drawsko County in West Pomeranian Voivodeship (north-west Poland)
- Dalewo, Stargard County in West Pomeranian Voivodeship (north-west Poland)
