= Grzybno =

Grzybno may refer to:

- Grzybno, Greater Poland Voivodeship (west-central Poland)
- Grzybno, Brodnica County in Kuyavian-Pomeranian Voivodeship (north-central Poland)
- Grzybno, Chełmno County in Kuyavian-Pomeranian Voivodeship (north-central Poland)
- Grzybno, Kartuzy County in Pomeranian Voivodeship (north Poland)
- Grzybno, Kościerzyna County in Pomeranian Voivodeship (north Poland)
- Grzybno, Drawsko County in West Pomeranian Voivodeship (north-west Poland)
- Grzybno, Gryfino County in West Pomeranian Voivodeship (north-west Poland)
- Grzybno, Myślibórz County in West Pomeranian Voivodeship (north-west Poland)
- Grzybno, Sławno County in West Pomeranian Voivodeship (north-west Poland)
