= Gajewo, Drawsko County =

Gajewo
- Village
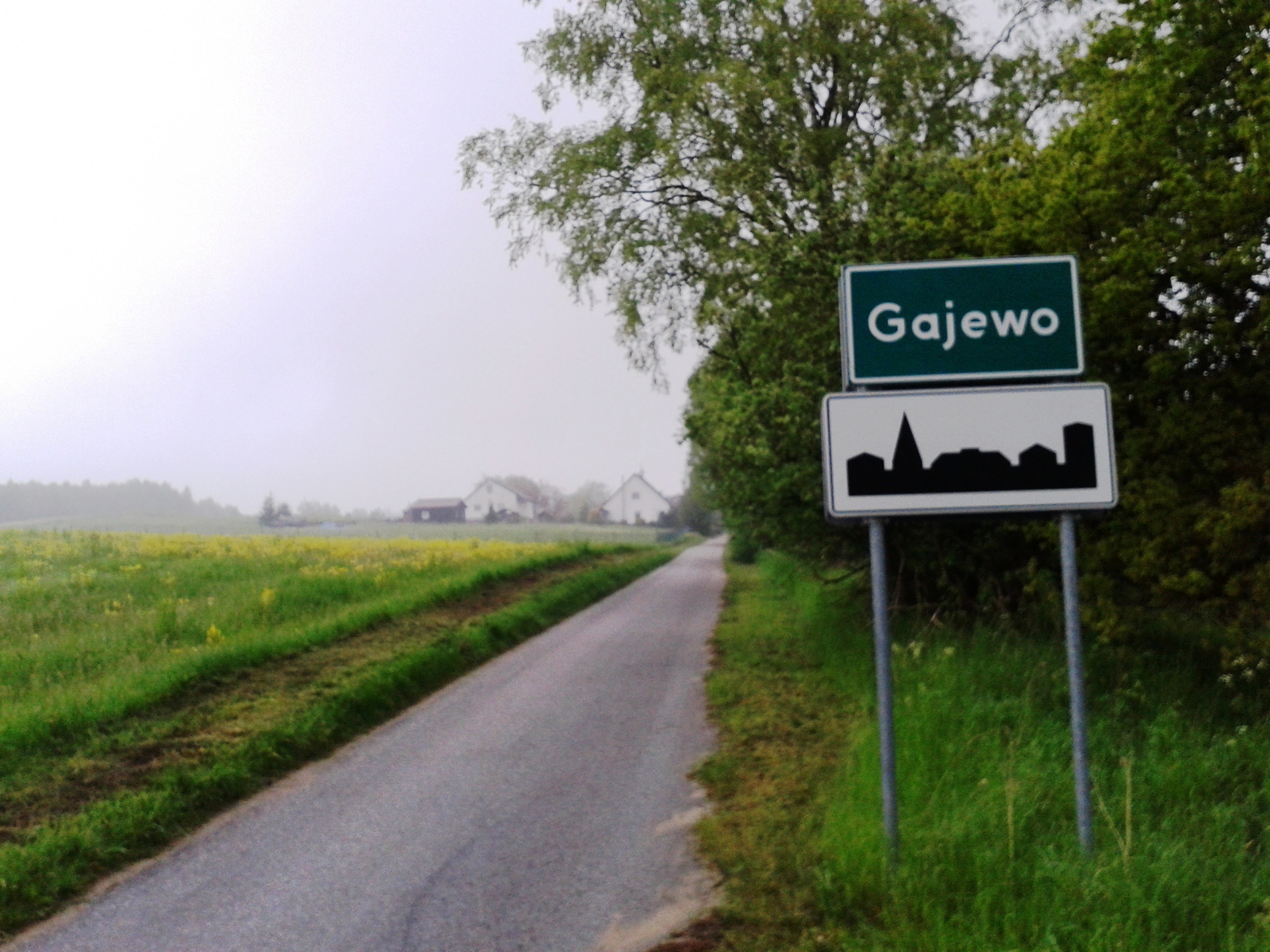
- Gajewo

- Location within Poland
- Coordinates: 53°33′56″N 15°47′13″E
- Country: Poland
- Voivodeship: West Pomeranian
- County: Drawsko
- Gmina: Drawsko Pomorskie
- Population: 20

Gajewo [ɡaˈjɛvɔ] is a village in the administrative district of Gmina Drawsko Pomorskie, within Drawsko County, West Pomeranian Voivodeship, in north-western Poland. It lies approximately 4 km (2 mi) north of Drawsko Pomorskie and 82 km (51 mi) east of the regional capital Szczecin.

For the history of the region, see History of Pomerania.

The village has a population of 20.
