= Mielenko Drawskie =

- Village
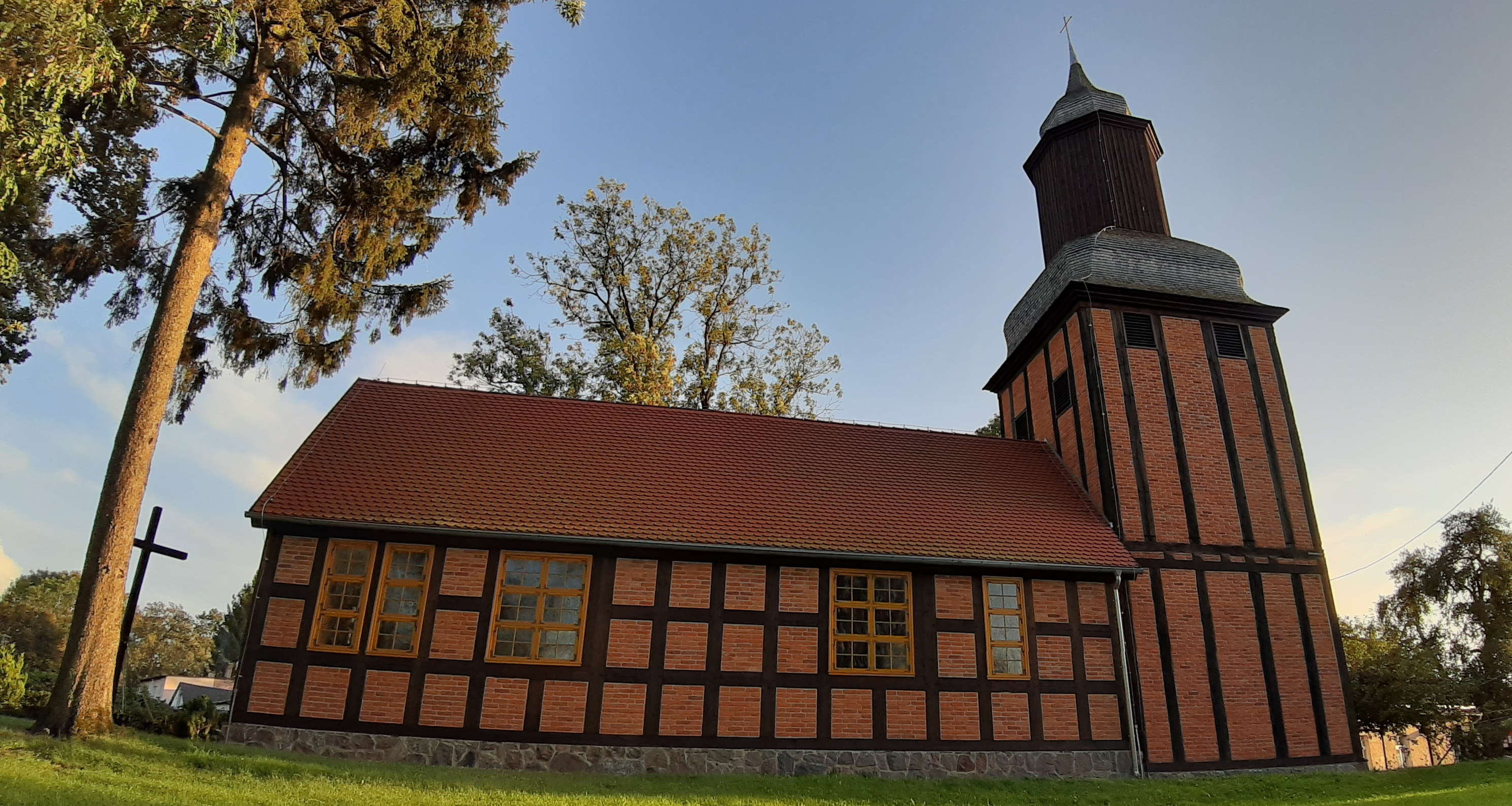
- Church of Our Lady Queen of Poland

- Location within Poland
- Coordinates: 53°29′N 15°47′E
- Country: Poland
- Voivodeship: West Pomeranian
- County: Drawsko
- Gmina: Drawsko Pomorskie

Mielenko Drawskie ([mjɛˈlɛnkɔ ˈdrafskʲɛ]; German: Klein Mellen) is a village in the administrative district of Gmina Drawsko Pomorskie, within Drawsko County, West Pomeranian Voivodeship, in north-western Poland. It lies approximately 6 km (4 mi) south of Drawsko Pomorskie and 80 km (50 mi) east of the regional capital Szczecin.

For the history of the region, see History of Pomerania.
