= Szczytniki =

Szczytniki may refer to the following places:

- Szczytniki, Proszowice County in Lesser Poland Voivodeship (south Poland)
- Szczytniki, Wieliczka County in Lesser Poland Voivodeship (south Poland)
- Szczytniki, Gmina Stopnica in Świętokrzyskie Voivodeship (south-central Poland)
- Szczytniki, Gmina Wiślica in Świętokrzyskie Voivodeship (south-central Poland)
- Szczytniki, Sandomierz County in Świętokrzyskie Voivodeship (south-central Poland)
- Szczytniki, Masovian Voivodeship (east-central Poland)
- Szczytniki, Kalisz County in Greater Poland Voivodeship (west-central Poland)
- Szczytniki, Poznań County in Greater Poland Voivodeship (west-central Poland)
- Szczytniki, Drawsko County in West Pomeranian Voivodeship (north-west Poland)
- Szczytniki, Goleniów County in West Pomeranian Voivodeship (north-west Poland)
