= Rydzewo, West Pomeranian Voivodeship =

Rydzewo
- Village
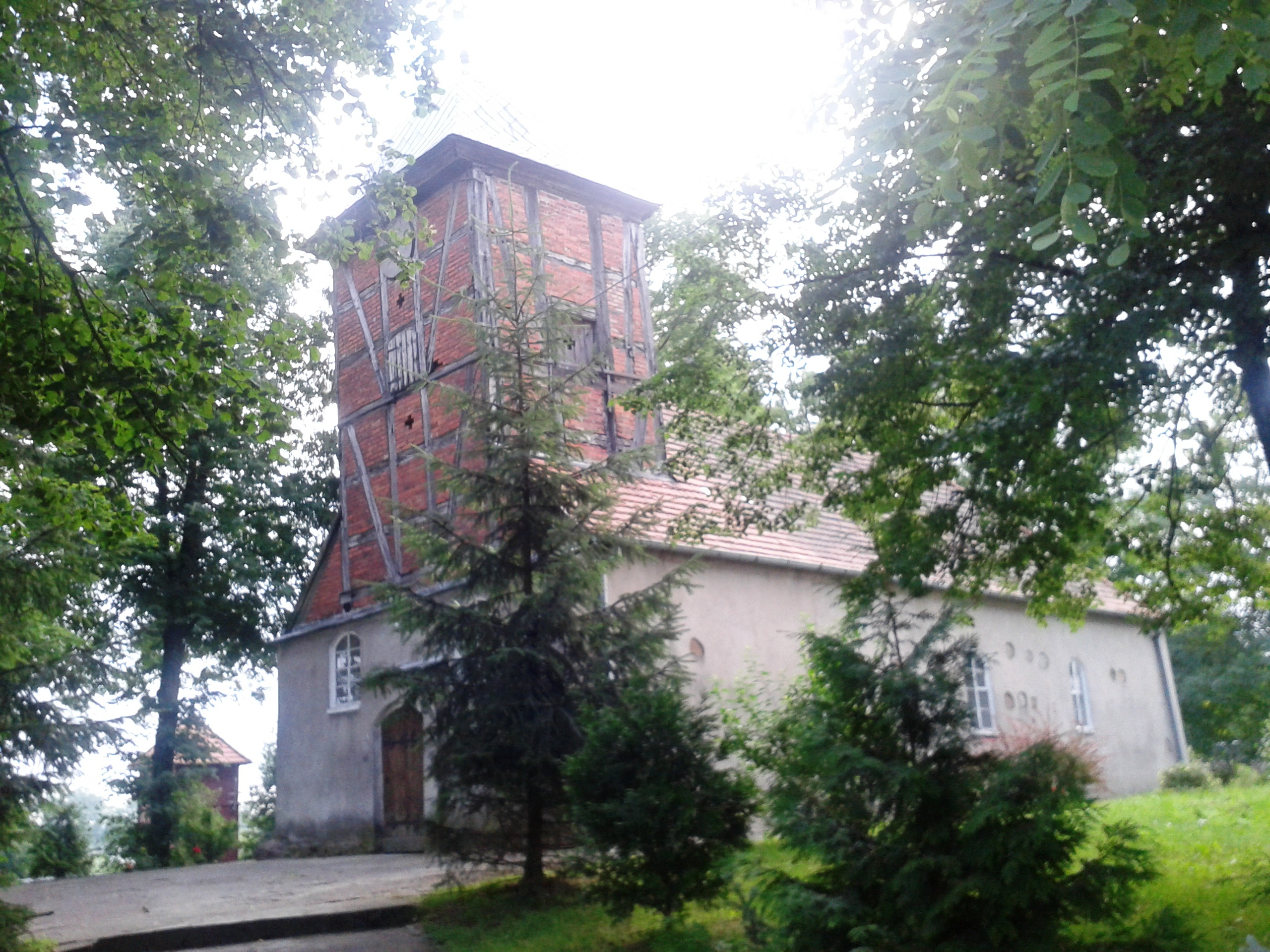
- Rydzewo (gmina Drawsko Pomorskie) - church

- Location within Poland
- Coordinates: 53°36′52″N 15°49′34″E
- Country: Poland
- Voivodeship: West Pomeranian
- County: Drawsko
- Gmina: Drawsko Pomorskie

Rydzewo [rɨˈd͡zɛvɔ] (German: Rützow) is a village in the administrative district of Gmina Drawsko Pomorskie, within Drawsko County, West Pomeranian Voivodeship, in north-western Poland. It lies approximately 10 km (6 mi) north of Drawsko Pomorskie and 86 km (53 mi) east of the regional capital Szczecin.

For the history of the region, see History of Pomerania.
