= Żółcin =

- Settlement
- Location within Poland
- Coordinates: 53°35′54″N 15°49′15″E
- Country: Poland
- Voivodeship: West Pomeranian
- County: Drawsko
- Gmina: Drawsko Pomorskie

Żółcin [ˈʐuu̯t͡ɕin] (German: Neu Schilde) is a settlement in the administrative district of Gmina Drawsko Pomorskie, within Drawsko County, West Pomeranian Voivodeship, in north-western Poland. It lies approximately 8 km (5 mi) north of Drawsko Pomorskie and 85 km (53 mi) east of the regional capital Szczecin.

For the history of the region, see History of Pomerania.
