= Woliczno =

- Village
- Location within Poland
- Coordinates: 53°30′N 15°45′E
- Country: Poland
- Voivodeship: West Pomeranian
- County: Drawsko
- Gmina: Drawsko Pomorskie

Woliczno [vɔˈlit͡ʂnɔ] (German: Golz) is a village in the administrative district of Gmina Drawsko Pomorskie, within Drawsko County, West Pomeranian Voivodeship, in north-western Poland. It lies approximately 5 km (3 mi) south-west of Drawsko Pomorskie and 78 km (48 mi) east of the regional capital Szczecin.

For the history of the region, see History of Pomerania.
