= Marysin, West Pomeranian Voivodeship =

Marysin
- Settlement
- Country: Poland
- Voivodeship: West Pomeranian
- County: Drawsko
- Gmina: Ostrowice
- Time zone: UTC+01:00 (CET)
  - Summer (DST): UTC+02:00 (CEST)

Marysin [maˈrɨɕin] (German: Marienhof) is a settlement in the administrative district of Gmina Ostrowice, within Drawsko County, West Pomeranian Voivodeship, in north-western Poland.

For the history of the region, see History of Pomerania.
