= Konotop, Drawsko County =

Konotop
- Village
- Location within Poland
- Coordinates: 53°26′N 15°49′E
- Country: Poland
- Voivodeship: West Pomeranian
- County: Drawsko
- Gmina: Drawsko Pomorskie
- Population: 170

Konotop [kɔˈnɔtɔp] (German: Köhntöpf) is a village in the administrative district of Gmina Drawsko Pomorskie, within Drawsko County, West Pomeranian Voivodeship, in north-western Poland. It lies approximately 12 km (7 mi) south of Drawsko Pomorskie and 82 km (51 mi) east of the regional capital Szczecin.

For the history of the region, see History of Pomerania.

The village has a population of 170.
