= Oleszno, West Pomeranian Voivodeship =

Oleszno
- Village
- Location within Poland
- Coordinates: 53°28′21″N 15°45′49″E
- Country: Poland
- Voivodeship: West Pomeranian
- County: Drawsko
- Gmina: Drawsko Pomorskie
- Population: 670

Oleszno [ɔˈlɛʂnɔ] (German: Welschenburg) is a village in the administrative district of Gmina Drawsko Pomorskie, within Drawsko County, West Pomeranian Voivodeship, in north-western Poland. It lies approximately 8 km (5 mi) south of Drawsko Pomorskie and 79 km (49 mi) east of the regional capital Szczecin.

The village has a population of 670.

== See also ==
- History of Pomerania
