= Płocie =

- Village
- Location within Poland
- Coordinates: 53°39′11″N 16°02′50″E
- Country: Poland
- Voivodeship: West Pomeranian
- County: Drawsko
- Gmina: Ostrowice

Płocie [ˈpwɔt͡ɕɛ] (formerly German Plötzenhof) is a village in the administrative district of Gmina Ostrowice, within Drawsko County, West Pomeranian Voivodeship, in north-western Poland.

For the history of the region, see History of Pomerania.
