= Żołędowo, West Pomeranian Voivodeship =

Żołędowo
- Village
- Location within Poland
- Coordinates: 53°24′58″N 15°51′1″E
- Country: Poland
- Voivodeship: West Pomeranian
- County: Drawsko
- Gmina: Drawsko Pomorskie
- Population: 50

Żołędowo [ʐɔwɛnˈdɔvɔ] (German: Mittelfelde) is a village in the administrative district of Gmina Drawsko Pomorskie, within Drawsko County, West Pomeranian Voivodeship, in north-western Poland. It lies approximately 14 km (9 mi) south of Drawsko Pomorskie and 85 km (53 mi) east of the regional capital Szczecin.

For the history of the region, see History of Pomerania.

The village has a population of 50.
