= Paprotno, Drawsko County =

Paprotno
- Village
- Country: Poland
- Voivodeship: West Pomeranian
- County: Drawsko
- Gmina: Drawsko Pomorskie
- Time zone: UTC+01:00 (CET)
  - Summer (DST): UTC+02:00 (CEST)

Paprotno [paˈprɔtnɔ] is a village in the administrative district of Gmina Drawsko Pomorskie, within Drawsko County, West Pomeranian Voivodeship, in north-western Poland.

For the history of the region, see History of Pomerania.
