= Śródlesie, West Pomeranian Voivodeship =

Śródlesie
- Settlement
- Location within Poland
- Coordinates: 53°37′06″N 15°57′49″E
- Country: Poland
- Voivodeship: West Pomeranian
- County: Drawsko
- Gmina: Ostrowice

Śródlesie [ɕruˈdlɛɕɛ] (German: Antonienhof) is a settlement in the administrative district of Gmina Ostrowice, within Drawsko County, West Pomeranian Voivodeship, in north-western Poland.

For the history of the region, see History of Pomerania.
