= Kosobądź =

- Settlement
- Location within Poland
- Coordinates: 53°34′50″N 15°53′44″E
- Country: Poland
- Voivodeship: West Pomeranian
- County: Drawsko
- Gmina: Ostrowice

Kosobądź [kɔˈsɔbɔnt͡ɕ] (German: Kotzbahn) is a settlement in the administrative district of Gmina Ostrowice, within Drawsko County, West Pomeranian Voivodeship, in north-western Poland.

For the history of the region, see History of Pomerania.
