= Golina, Drawsko County =

Golina
- Settlement
- Location within Poland
- Coordinates: 53°34′8″N 15°45′46″E
- Country: Poland
- Voivodeship: West Pomeranian
- County: Drawsko
- Gmina: Drawsko Pomorskie

Golina [ɡɔˈlina] is a settlement in the administrative district of Gmina Drawsko Pomorskie, within Drawsko County, West Pomeranian Voivodeship, in north-western Poland. It lies approximately 5 km (3 mi) north-west of Drawsko Pomorskie and 80 km (50 mi) east of the regional capital Szczecin.

For the history of the region, see History of Pomerania.
