= Miłobądź, West Pomeranian Voivodeship =

Miłobądź
- Settlement
- Country: Poland
- Voivodeship: West Pomeranian
- County: Drawsko
- Gmina: Ostrowice

Miłobądź [miˈwɔbɔnt͡ɕ] is a settlement in the administrative district of Gmina Ostrowice, within Drawsko County, West Pomeranian Voivodeship, in north-western Poland.

For the history of the region, see History of Pomerania.
