= Dalewo, Drawsko County =

Dalewo
- Village
- Location within Poland
- Coordinates: 53°32′N 15°52′E
- Country: Poland
- Voivodeship: West Pomeranian
- County: Drawsko
- Gmina: Drawsko Pomorskie

Dalewo [daˈlɛvɔ] (German: Dalow) is a village in the administrative district of Gmina Drawsko Pomorskie, within Drawsko County, West Pomeranian Voivodeship, in north-western Poland. It lies approximately 5 km (3 mi) east of Drawsko Pomorskie and 87 km (54 mi) east of the regional capital Szczecin.

For the history of the region, see History of Pomerania.
