= Ziemsko =

- Village
- Location within Poland
- Coordinates: 53°28′N 15°41′E
- Country: Poland
- Voivodeship: West Pomeranian
- County: Drawsko
- Gmina: Drawsko Pomorskie
- Time zone: UTC+1 (CET)
  - Summer (DST): UTC+2 (CEST)
- Vehicle registration: ZDR

Ziemsko [ˈʑɛmskɔ] (German: Zamzow) is a village in the administrative district of Gmina Drawsko Pomorskie, within Drawsko County, West Pomeranian Voivodeship, in north-western Poland. It lies approximately 11 km (7 mi) south-west of Drawsko Pomorskie and 74 km (46 mi) east of the regional capital Szczecin.

== History ==
During World War II, the German Nazi government operated a forced labour subcamp of the Stalag II-D prisoner-of-war camp in the village. On 31 January 1945, the village was the site of a stopover during the German-organised march of some 6,000 Polish prisoners of war from the Oflag II-D camp headed westwards.
