= Borne, Drawsko County =

Borne
- Village
- Location within Poland
- Coordinates: 53°37′38″N 15°55′43″E
- Country: Poland
- Voivodeship: West Pomeranian
- County: Drawsko
- Gmina: Ostrowice

Borne [ˈbɔrnɛ] (formerly German Born) is a village in the administrative district of Gmina Ostrowice, within Drawsko County, West Pomeranian Voivodeship, in north-western Poland.

For more on the history of the region, see History of Pomerania.
