= Gmina Drawsko Pomorskie =

Gmina Drawsko Pomorskie Drawsko Pomorskie Commune
- Gmina
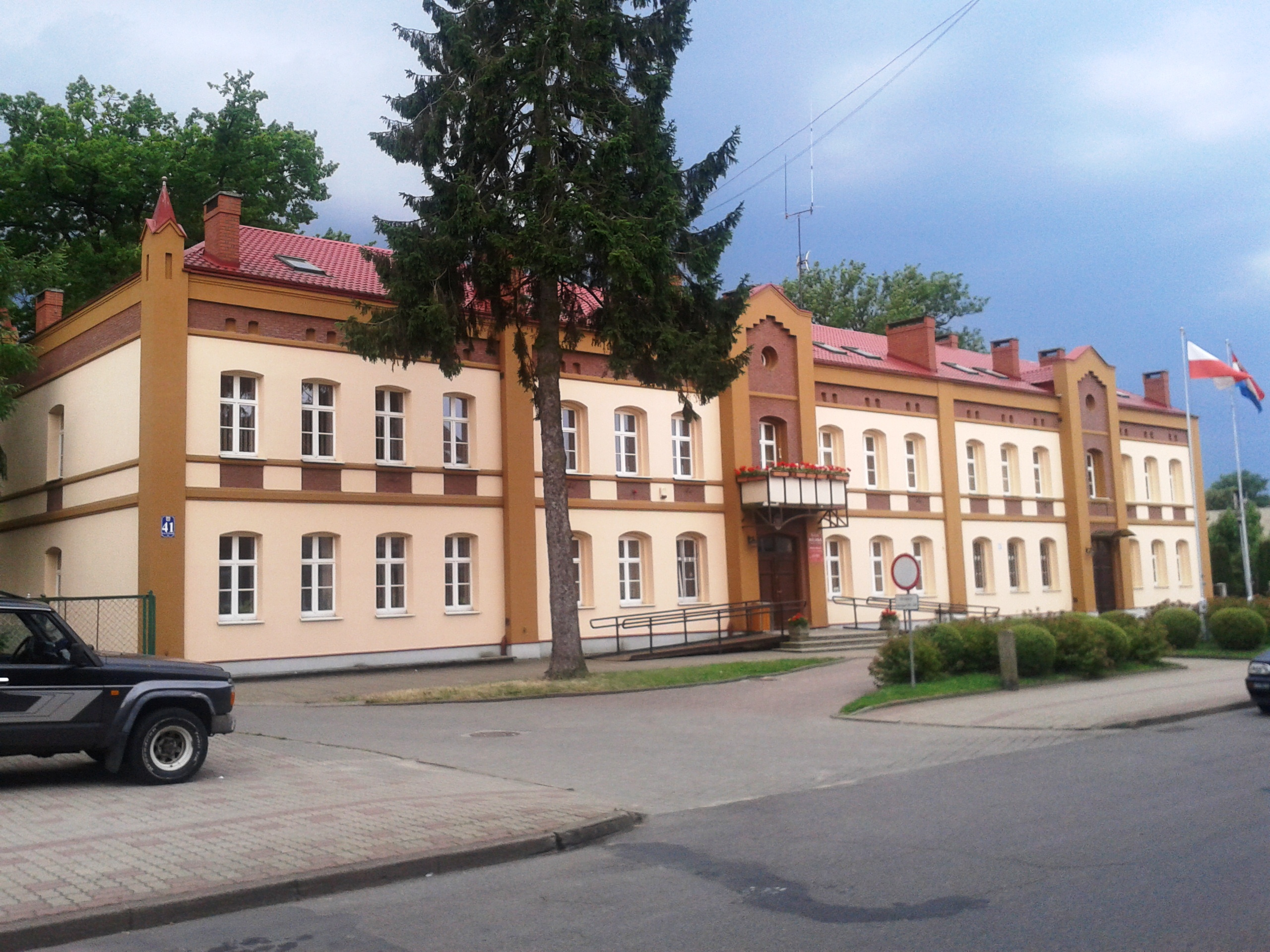
- Gmina office in Drawsko Pomorskie

- Flag Coat of arms
- Interactive map of Gmina Drawsko Pomorskie
- Coordinates (Drawsko Pomorskie): 53°32′N 15°48′E
- Country: Poland
- Voivodeship: West Pomeranian
- County: Drawsko
- Seat: Drawsko Pomorskie

Area
  - Total: 344.76 km^{2} (133.11 sq mi)

Population (2006)
  - Total: 16,537
  - Density: 47.967/km^{2} (124.23/sq mi)
  - Urban: 11,465
  - Rural: 5,072
- Time zone: UTC+1 (CET)
  - Summer (DST): UTC+2 (CEST)
- Vehicle registration: ZDR
- Website: http://www.drawsko.pl/

Gmina Drawsko Pomorskie is an urban-rural gmina (administrative district) in Drawsko County, West Pomeranian Voivodeship, in north-western Poland. Its seat is the town of Drawsko Pomorskie, which lies approximately 82 kilometres (51 mi) east of the regional capital Szczecin.

The gmina covers an area of 344.76 square kilometres (133.1 sq mi), and as of 2006 its total population is 16,537 (out of which the population of Drawsko Pomorskie amounts to 11,465, and the population of the rural part of the gmina is 5,072).

== Villages ==
Apart from the town of Drawsko Pomorskie, Gmina Drawsko Pomorskie contains the villages and settlements of Cianowo, Dalewo, Gajewko, Gajewo, Golina, Gudowo, Jankowo, Karwice, Konotop, Krzynno, Kumki, Łabędzie, Lasocin, Linowno, Mielenko Drawskie, Nętno, Olchowiec, Oleszno, Paprotno, Roztoki, Rydzewo, Suliszewo, Ustok, Woliczno, Zagórki, Zagozd, Zarańsko, Zbrojewo, Ziemsko, Żółcin, Żołędowo and Żółte.

== Neighbouring gminas ==
Gmina Drawsko Pomorskie is bordered by the gminas of Brzeżno, Dobrzany, Ińsko, Kalisz Pomorski, Łobez, Ostrowice, Węgorzyno and Złocieniec.
