= Drzeńsko, Drawsko County =

Drzeńsko
- Settlement
- Location within Poland
- Coordinates: 53°34′57″N 16°00′06″E
- Country: Poland
- Voivodeship: West Pomeranian
- County: Drawsko
- Gmina: Ostrowice

Drzeńsko [ˈdʐɛɲskɔ] (German: Dranzig) is a settlement in the administrative district of Gmina Ostrowice, within Drawsko County, West Pomeranian Voivodeship, in north-western Poland.

For the history of the region, see History of Pomerania.
