= Ostrowice =

- Village
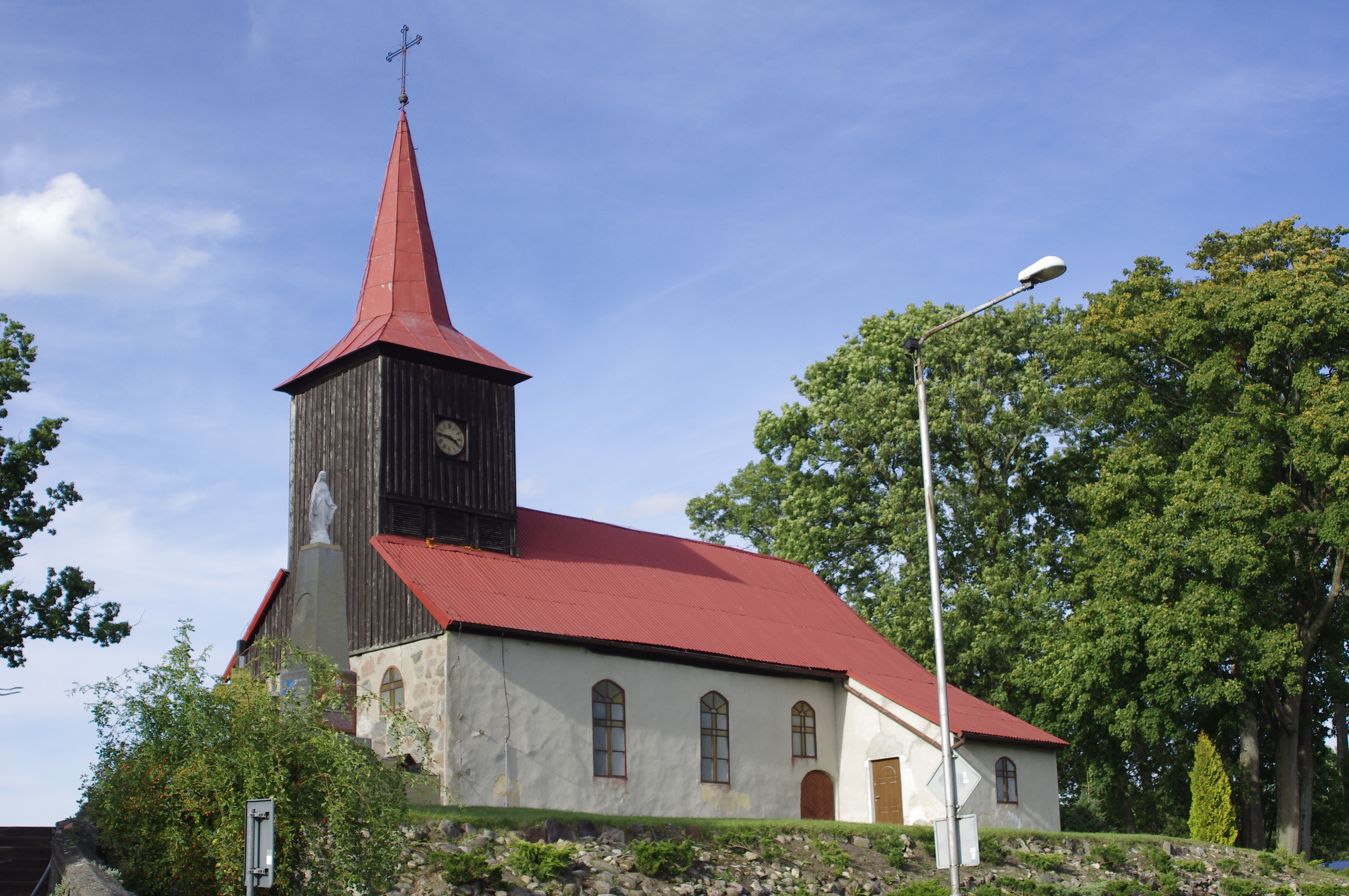

- Location within Poland
- Coordinates: 53°38′17″N 15°58′26″E
- Country: Poland
- Voivodeship: West Pomeranian
- County: Drawsko
- Gmina: Ostrowice
- Population: 540

Ostrowice [ɔstrɔˈvit͡sɛ] (formerly German Wusterwitz) is a village in Drawsko County, West Pomeranian Voivodeship, in north-western Poland. Until January 1, 2019, it was the seat of the gmina (administrative district) called Gmina Ostrowice that was created after the Second World War but divided on January 1, 2019, between the administrative districts of Zlocieniec and Drawsko Pomorskie because of high debts. It lies approximately 17 km (11 mi) north-east of Drawsko Pomorskie and 96 km (60 mi) east of the regional capital Szczecin.

For the history of the region, see History of Pomerania.

The village has a population of 540.
