= Drawsko Pomorskie =

Town in West Pomeranian Voivodeship, Poland

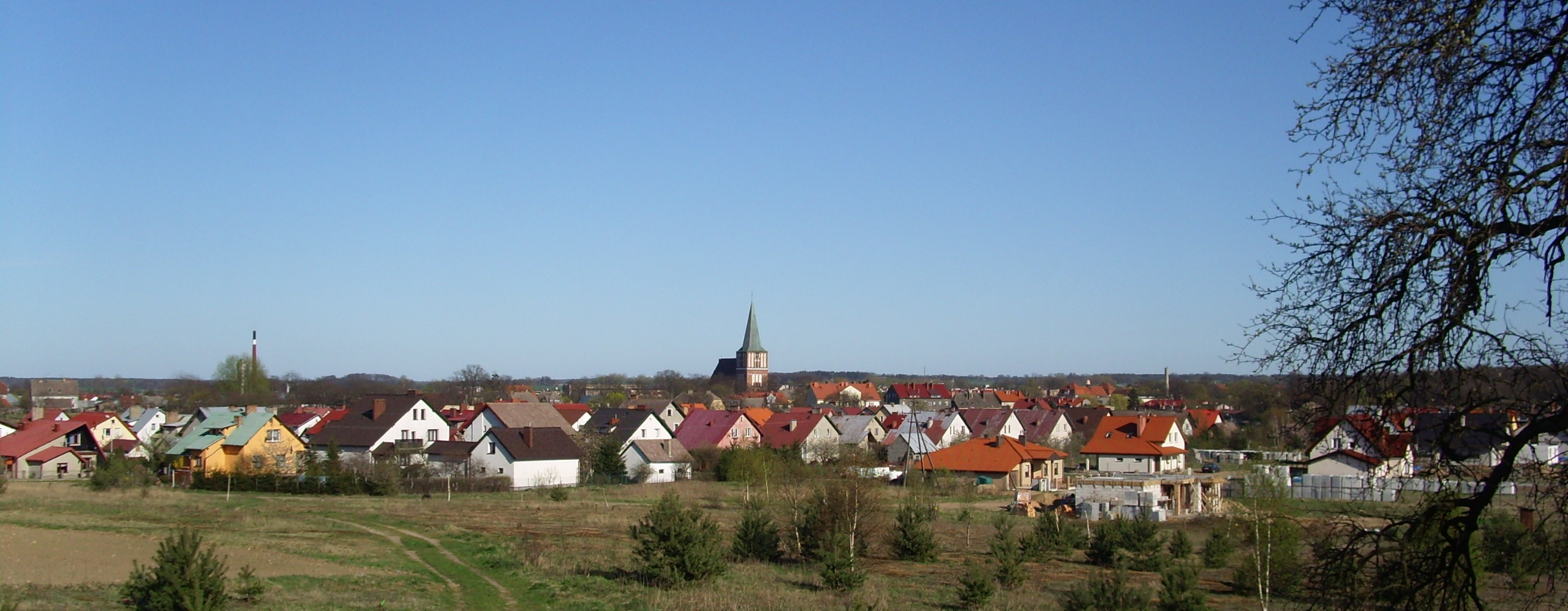
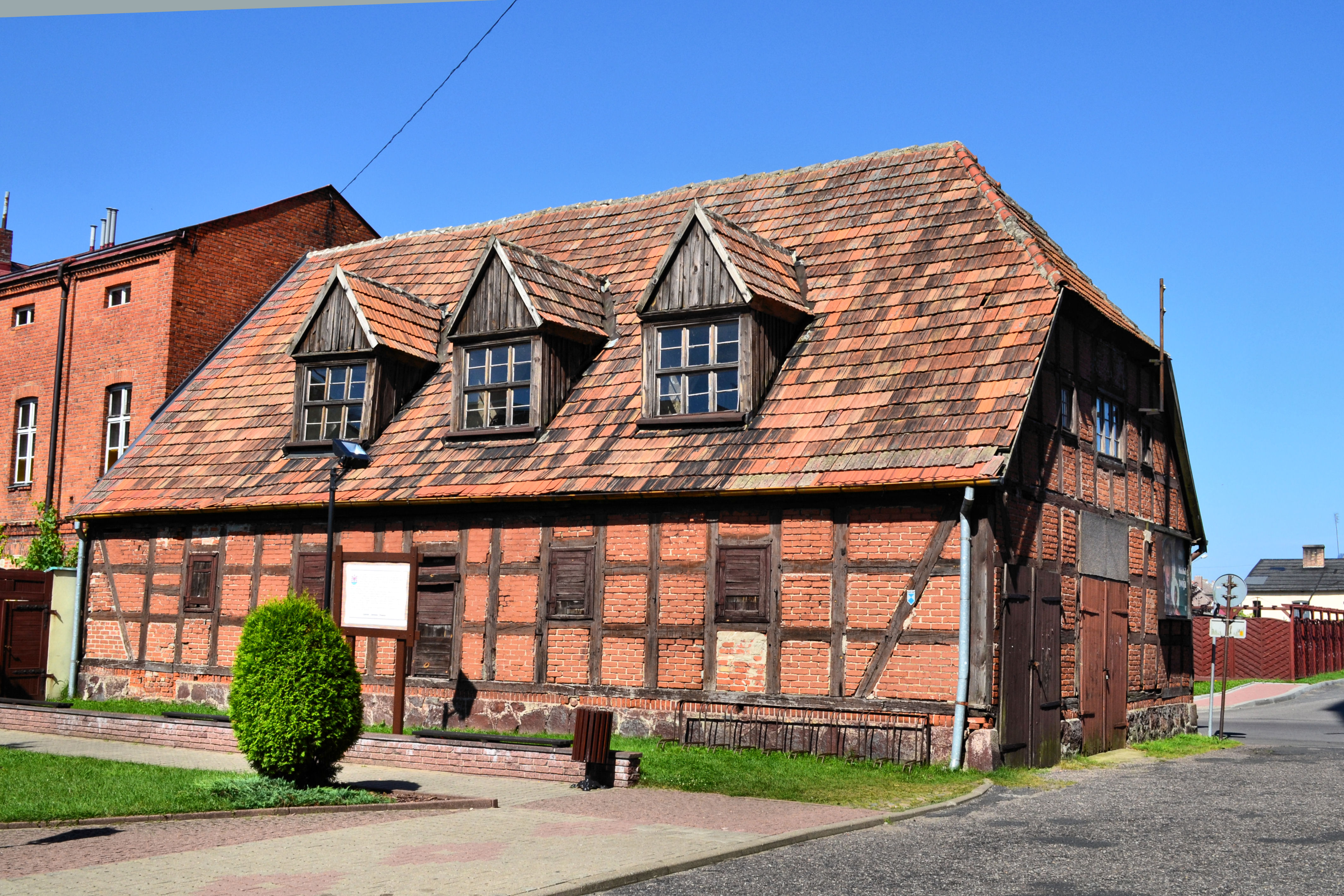
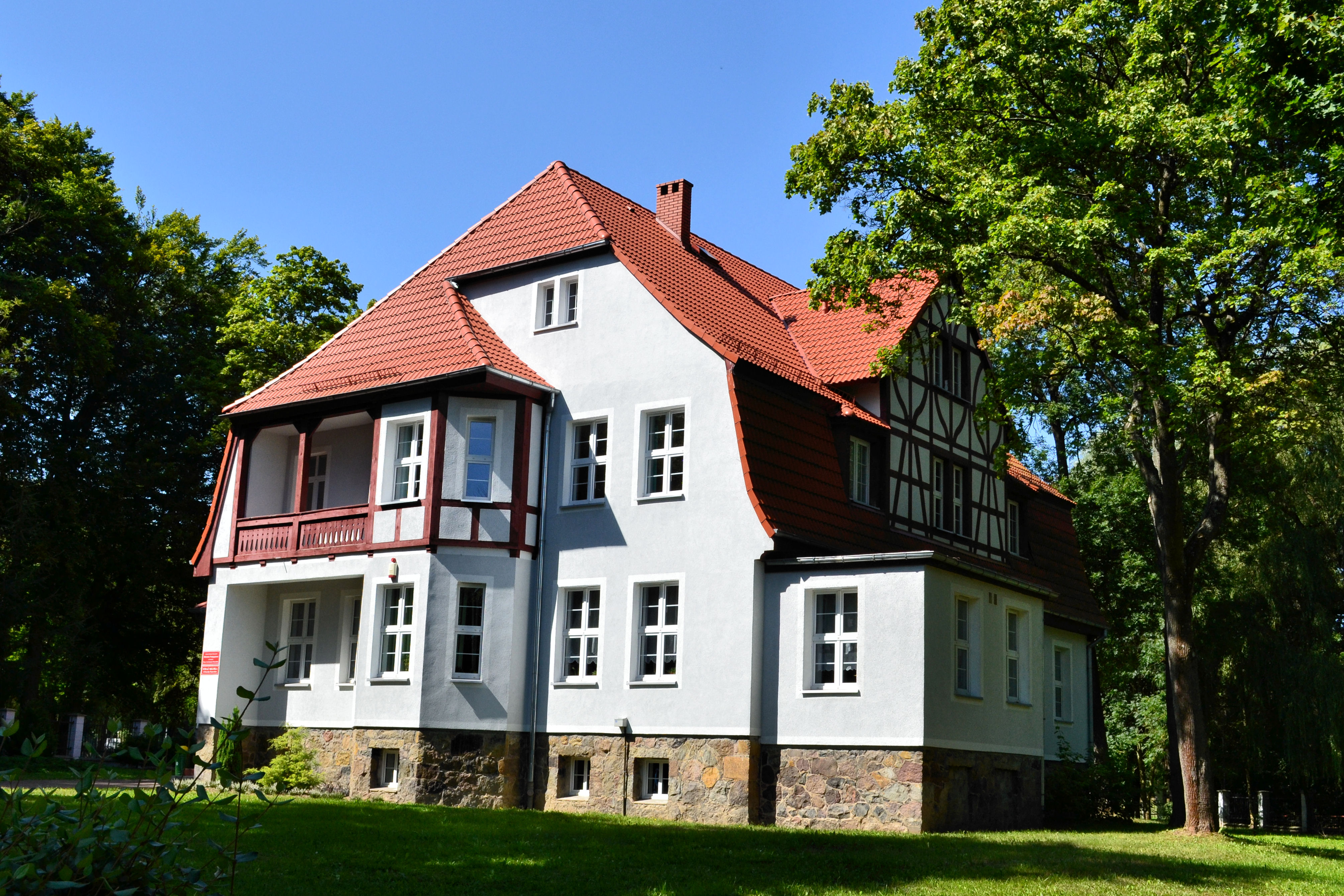
- Skyline Timber framed granary Villa in Chopin Park

- Flag Coat of arms

- Location within Poland
- Coordinates: 53°32′N 15°48′E
- Country: Poland
- Voivodeship: West Pomeranian
- County: Drawsko
- Gmina: Drawsko Pomorskie
- Established: 7th century
- Town rights: 1297

Government
  - Mayor: Krzysztof Czerwiński

Area
  - Total: 22.24 km^{2} (8.59 sq mi)
- Elevation: 160 m (520 ft)

Population (31 December 2021)
  - Total: 11,292
  - Density: 507.7/km^{2} (1,315/sq mi)
- Time zone: UTC+1 (CET)
  - Summer (DST): UTC+2 (CEST)
- Postal code: 78-500
- Area code: +48 94
- Vehicle registration: ZDR
- Website: http://www.drawsko.pl/

Drawsko Pomorskie [ˈdrafskɔ pɔˈmɔrskʲɛ] (until 1948 Polish: Drawsko; German: Dramburg) is a town in the West Pomeranian Voivodeship, in northwestern Poland. It is the administrative seat of Drawsko County and the urban-rural commune of Gmina Drawsko Pomorskie. As of December 2021, the town has a population of 11,292. It is home to the Drawsko Training Ground, one of the largest military training areas in Poland.

== Geography ==
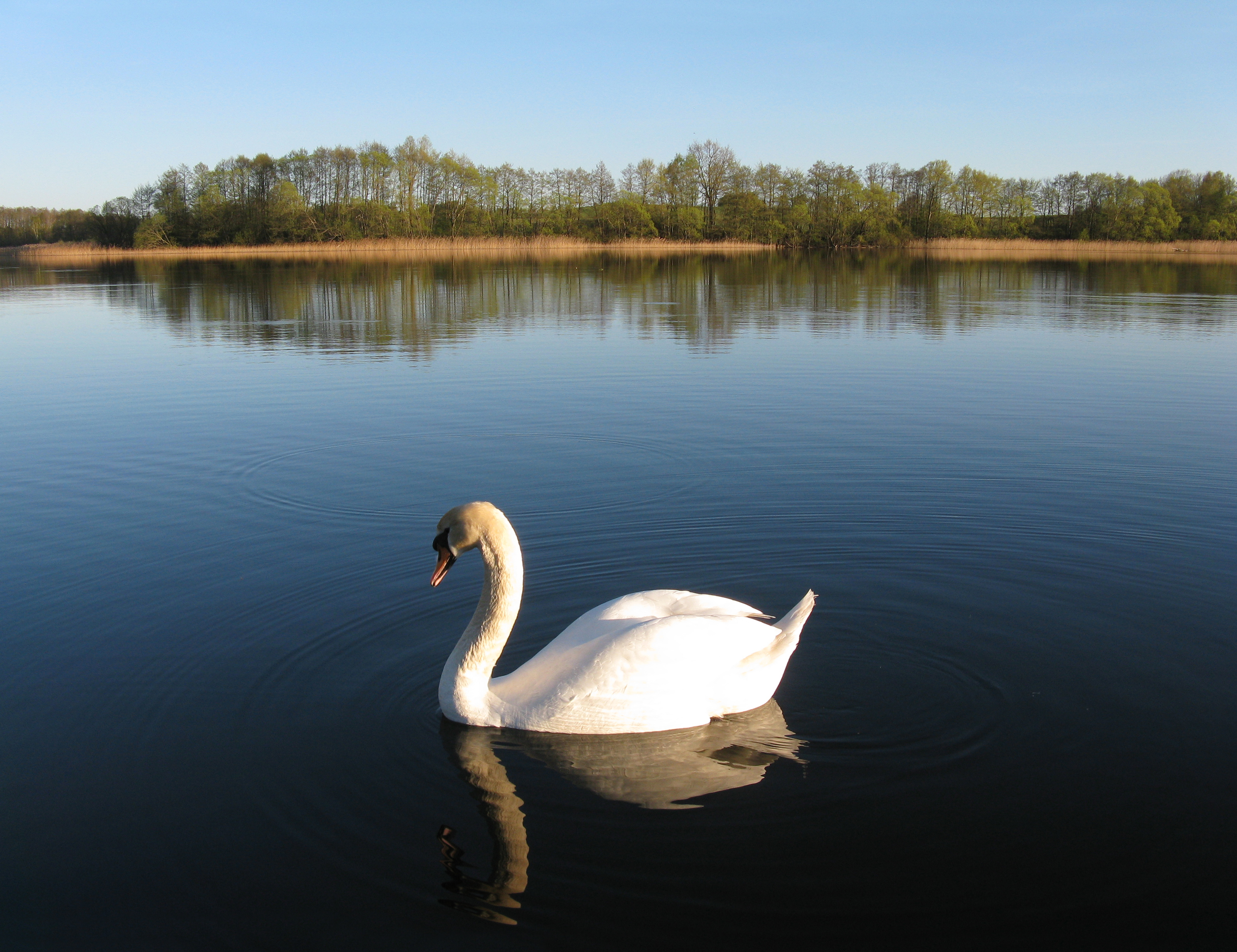
Lake Okra

Located in the southeast of West Pomeranian Voivodeship in the Pomerania region, Drawsko is situated within the Pomeranian Lakeland, the western spur of the Baltic Uplands. The town lies on the headwater of the Drawa River, a right tributary of the Noteć, west of an expansive woodland with the protected area of the Drawsko Landscape Park.

The regional capital Szczecin is about 100 km (62 mi) to the west. A large training area south of the town is frequently used in NATO exercises.

== History ==
=== Medieval Poland ===
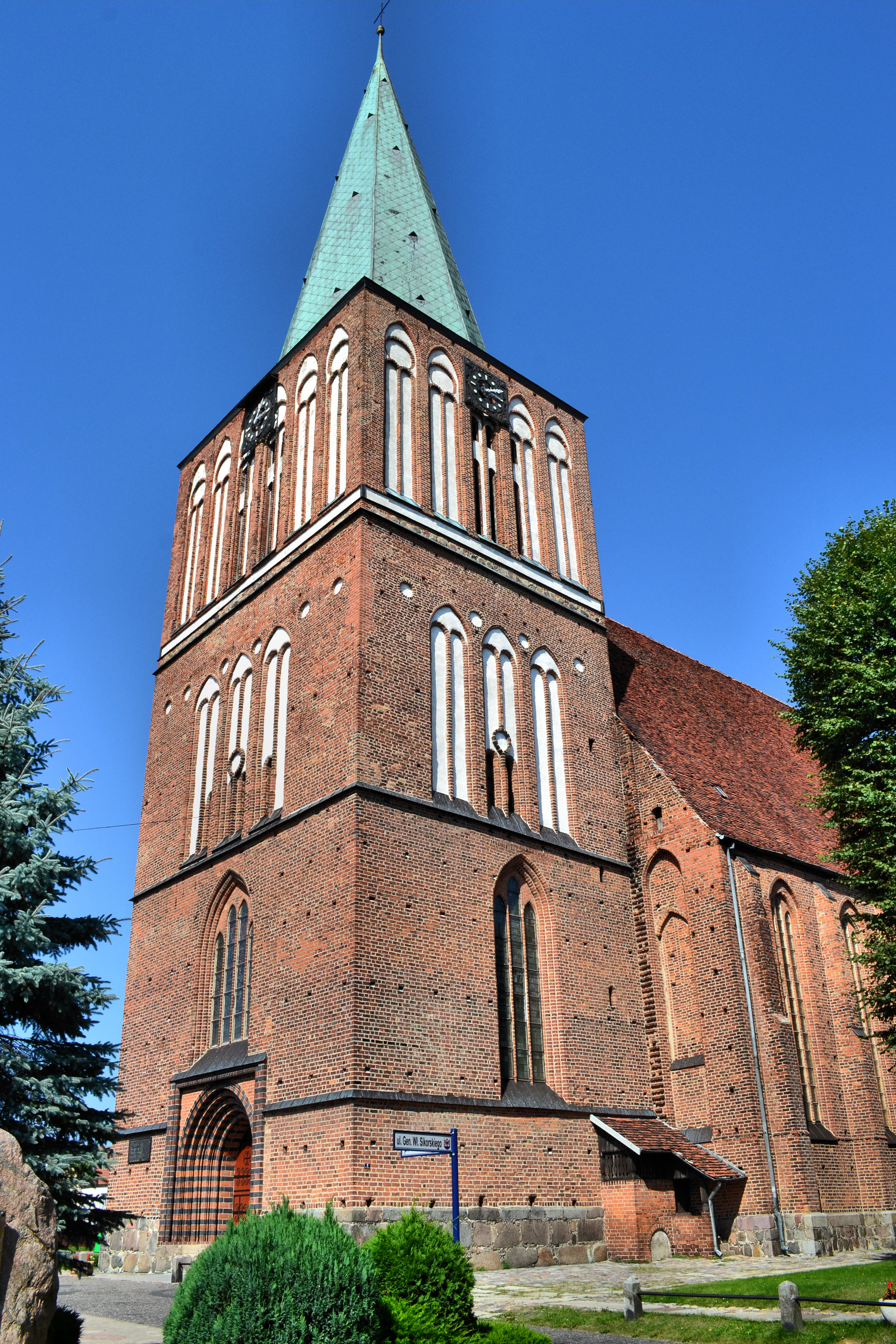
Gothic Resurrection Church

From the 7th century onwards Slavic tribes settled along the shores of the Drawa River, where they erected a fortress a few kilometers north of Lake Lubie. In the 10th century the region was under the sovereignty of the Piast duke Mieszko I of Poland; however, the sparsely inhabited border area during the fragmentation of Poland was also claimed by the Dukes of Pomerania, and later also by the mighty Ascanian margraves John I and Otto III.

=== New March ===
At that time, the fortress of Drawsko had been held by Duke Przemysł I of Greater Poland, but after his death the settlement was also acquired by the Margraves of Brandenburg. They invited Premonstratensian monks from Belbuck (Białoboki) Abbey near Trzebiatów to found a monastery in their new territory. These plans failed, however, as the desired location was too far from Belbuck and the monks saw the wilderness as unsuitable. The Brandenburg margraves planned to expand upon a settlement already developing near the fortress of Drawsko. The Uckermark knights Arnold, Konrad and Johann von Goltz were granted the right to develop the settlement into a town mentioned as Drawenborch. It grew after the arrival of German colonists, allowing the margraves to grant it Magdeburg town rights in 1297.

When the Ascanian dynasty became extinct in 1320, the colonisation efforts in the Neumark region abated. Nevertheless, to promote the further development of the newly established town of Dramburg, the Wittelsbach margrave Louis I of Brandenburg released the town from all duties from 1338 until 1350, when he ceded the town as a fief to the noble Wedell family. On 13 February 1368, Dramburg was the setting of a peace treaty between Elector Otto VII of Brandenburg and King Casimir III of Poland, whereby Otto returned the town of Wałcz to Poland. The influx of colonists began to cease, although by the end of the 14th century the Dramburg Neustadt ("new town") had developed on the southern shore of the Drawa.

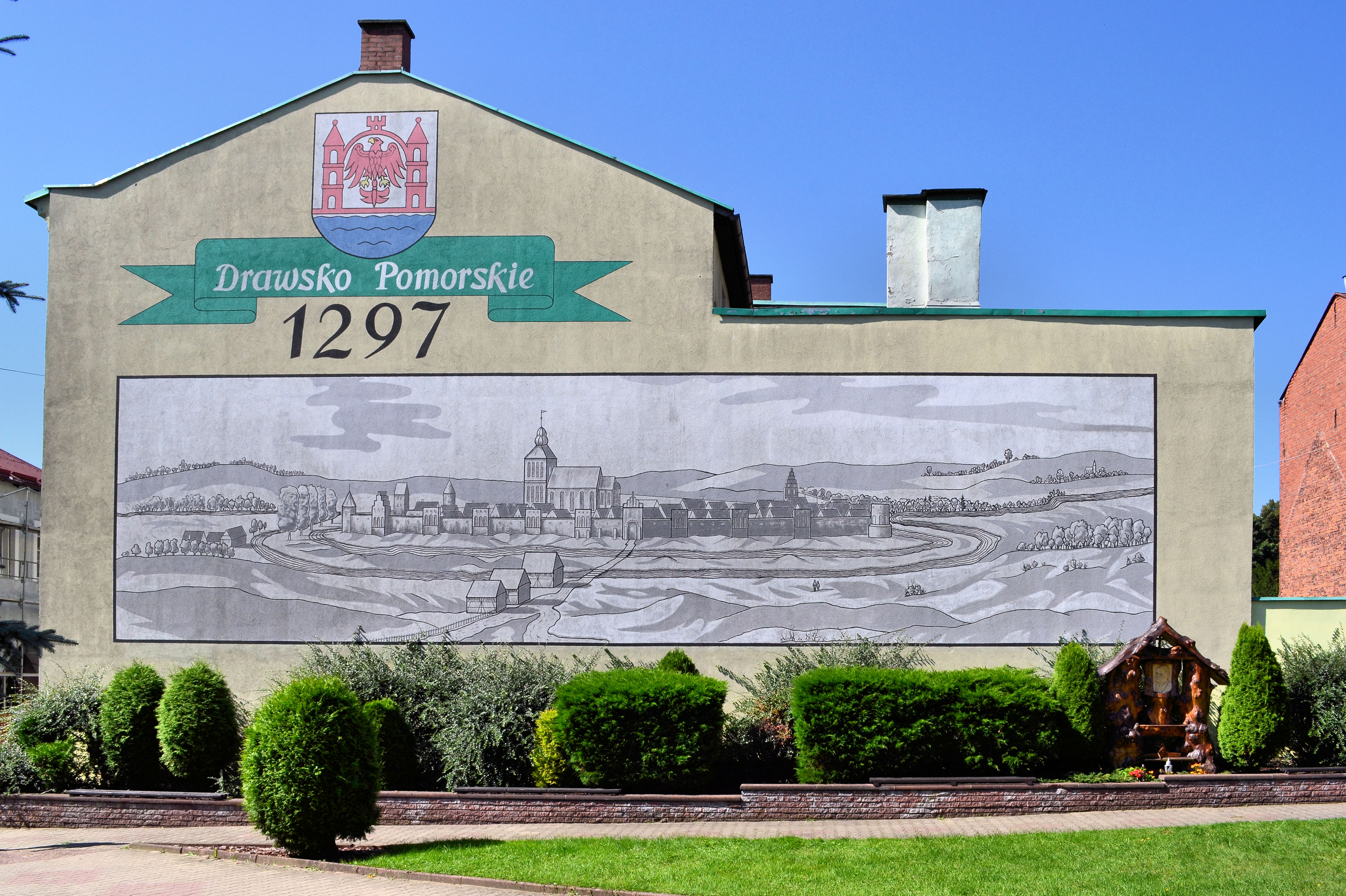
An old view of Drawsko Pomorskie in the form of a modern mural

From 1373 the New March was part of the Lands of the Bohemian (Czech) Crown under the House of Luxembourg. The decay of the region continued: held by Jobst of Moravia since 1388, it was pawned by his cousin Sigismund to the Teutonic Knights in 1402, despite an agreement with Poland, based on which Poland was to buy and re-incorporate the territory. The Teutonic Knights also neglected the region, which furthermore was devastated by Hussite forces in 1433. In 1454 the Knights sold the New March to the Hohenzollern elector Frederick II of Brandenburg, in order to raise funds for war with Poland. From that time on, the Hohenzollerns retained the region; the red eagle of the town's coat of arms was taken from the coat of arms of Brandenburg.

In 1537 the former Franciscan friar Faustinus Schliepe introduced Lutheranism to Dramburg during the Protestant Reformation. From 1540 the town was administered by the Order of St. John (until 1808). A great fire destroyed a wide section of Dramburg in 1620, leaving only five houses unscathed, while five years later numerous citizens died from plague. In 1638 during the Thirty Years' War, the Swedish colonel Beer plundered and pillaged Dramburg. Despite that setback, the town's economic advantages allowed it to recuperate quickly. Dramburg had staple rights, giving it the privilege to force merchants traveling on the Drawa to offer their wares, such as Kołobrzeg (Kolberg) salt, for sale at Dramburg's markets. Wool-weaving and shoe-making were also important craft industries since the Middle Ages.

=== Province of Pomerania ===
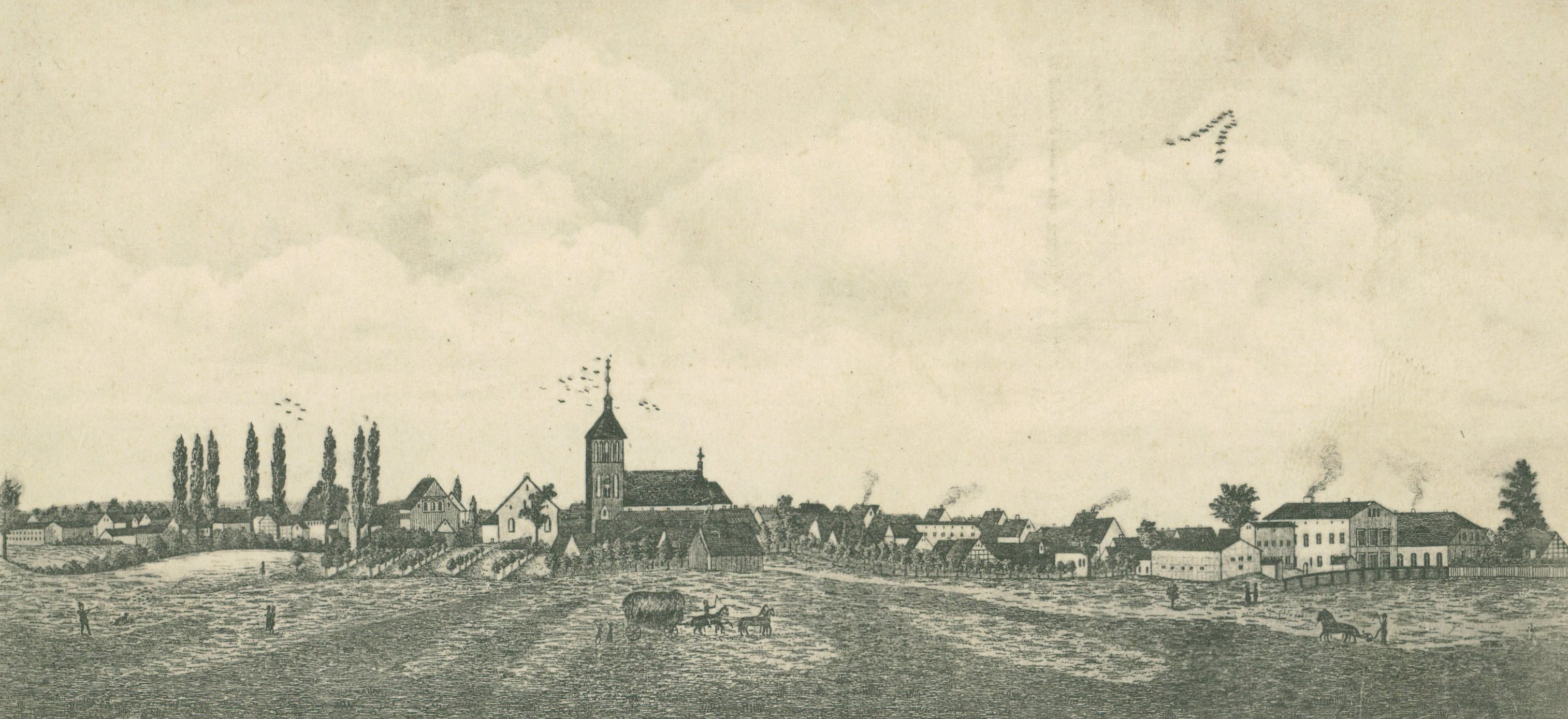
Panorama from the mid-19th century

Dramburg became part of the Kingdom of Prussia in 1701. With the reorganization of the Prussian provinces in 1815 following the Napoleonic Wars, Dramburg left the Neumark region and in 1818 became the seat of Landkreis Dramburg in the Regierungsbezirk of Köslin within the Prussian Province of Pomerania. Dramburg became part of the German Empire after the 1871 unification of Germany.

In 1877 the Pommersche Zentralbahn (Pomeranian Central Railway) became connected to the town, which was also connected in 1896 to the Saatziger Kleinbahnnetz (Szadzko District railroad network). Dramburg's access to the railroads led to the establishment of wood and textile industries. This led the Pommersche Saatzucht Gesellschaft based in Stettin (Szczecin) to use the Dramburg region as a testing area for its plant breeding experiments.

After Poland regained its independence and reincorporated many areas previously annexed by the Germans (but not Drawsko/Dramburg), following the 1919 Treaty of Versailles after World War I, many Germans from the former Province of Posen immigrated to Dramburg, expanding settlement in the south of the town. When the province of Posen-West Prussia was disbanded in 1938, Dramburg became part of Regierungsbezirk Schneidemühl (Piła). At the start of World War II, the German 4th Army invaded Poland from the town, and the Einsatzgruppe IV followed to commit atrocities against the Poles in various cities and towns, including Chojnice, Bydgoszcz, Białystok and Warsaw. During the war, the SS established a large training school for motorcyclists and mechanics in the town. In the course of the Vistula–Oder Offensive, on March 4, 1945 the Red Army and the Polish First Army captured the town, whose center was largely destroyed during the fighting.

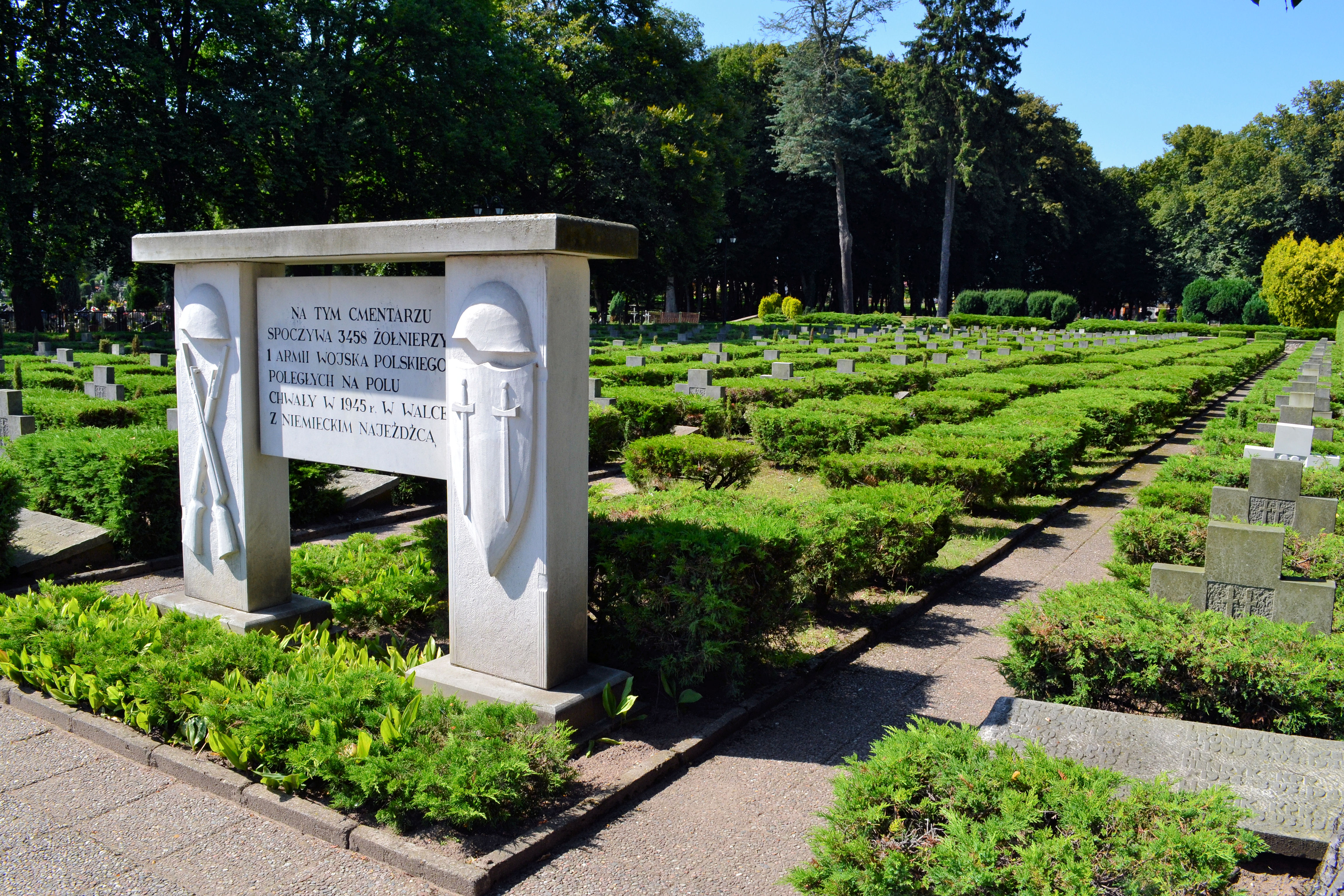
Military cemetery of the Polish First Army

=== Post-war Poland ===
Polish authorities began administering the town on March 6, 1945. The town became again part of Poland, although with a Soviet-installed communist regime, which remained in power until the 1980s. The remaining German citizens were expelled.

The town, initially named Drawsko, was renamed Drawsko Pomorskie by adding the adjective Pomorskie (meaning Pomeranian or in Pomerania) in 1948 to distinguish it from other Polish settlements of the same name. It was the administrative seat of a powiat until 1975. After the Local Government Reorganization Act of 1998, Drawsko became a county seat again in 1999.

== Population ==
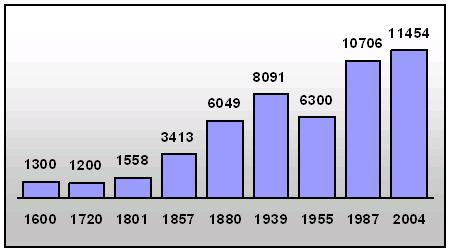

== Notable people ==
- Kacper Chodyna (born 1999), Polish professional football player
- August Froehlich (1891-1943), German Roman Catholic priest, opponent of National Socialism, defender of Polish forced laborers, served as rector of St. Paul the Apostle Parish in Drawsko Pomorskie
- Karl Christoph von der Goltz (1707–1761), lieutenant general in the Prussian army during the reign of Frederick the Great
- Natalia Oleszkiewicz (born 2002), Polish footballer
- Małgorzata Rohde (born 1962), Polish politician
- Mariusz Rumak (born 1977), Polish football manager
- Hans Wolter (1911–1978), German physicist who worked with mirrors
- Krystian Zalewski (born 1989), Polish distance runner in the 3000 metres steeplechase, competed at the 2016 Summer Olympics

== International relations ==
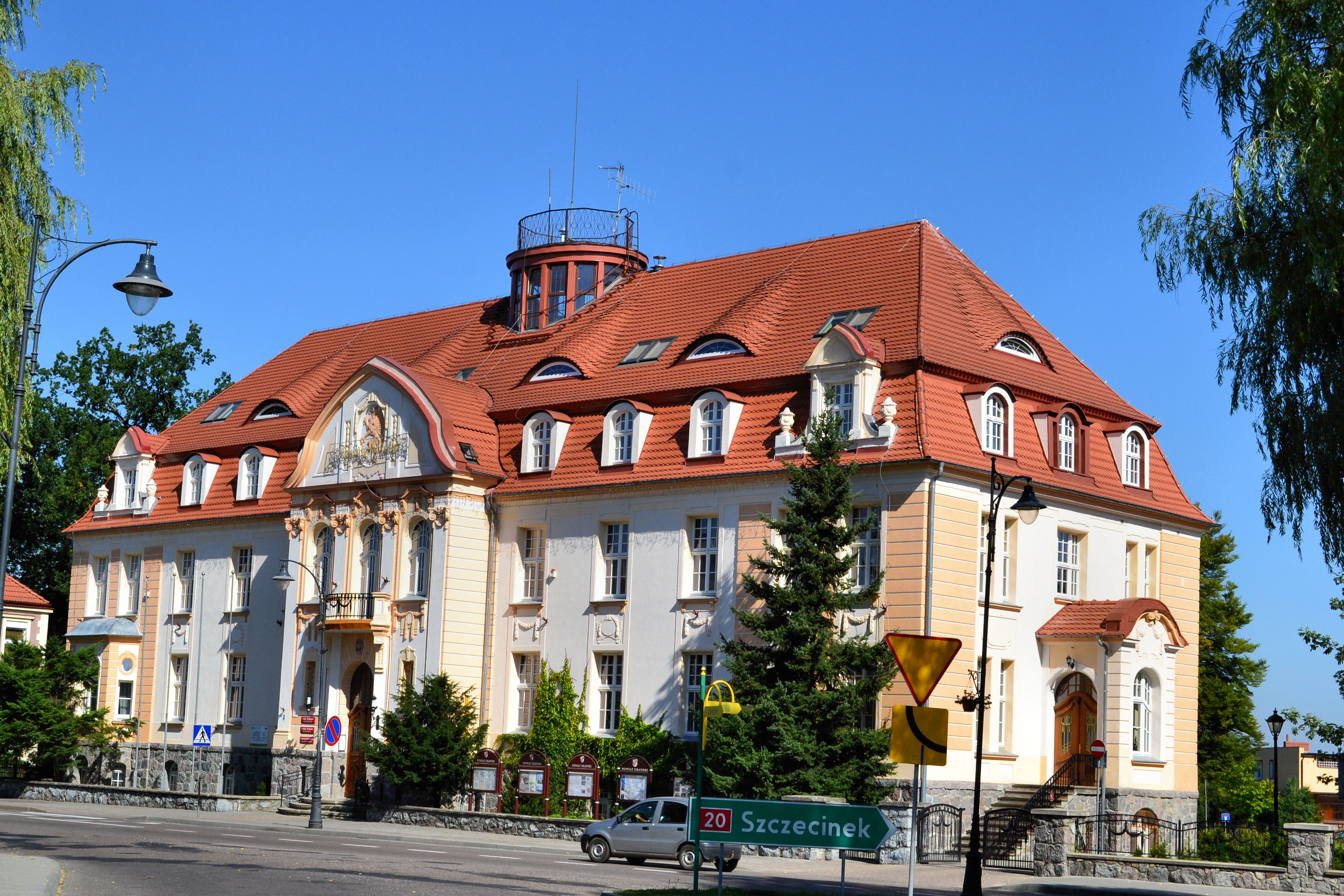
County office

Drawsko Pomorskie is twinned with:

- Bad Bramstedt, Germany
- Strasburg (Uckermark), Germany
- Złocieniec, Poland
