= Zajączkówko =

- Village
- Location within Poland
- Coordinates: 53°44′N 16°2′E
- Country: Poland
- Voivodeship: West Pomeranian
- County: Świdwin
- Gmina: Połczyn-Zdrój

Zajączkówko [zajɔnt͡ʂˈkufkɔ] (German Neu Sanskow) is a village in the administrative district of Gmina Połczyn-Zdrój, within Świdwin County, West Pomeranian Voivodeship, in north-western Poland. It lies approximately 6 km (4 mi) south-west of Połczyn-Zdrój, 19 km (12 mi) east of Świdwin, and 103 km (64 mi) east of the regional capital Szczecin.

== See also ==
- History of Pomerania
