= Leo Levy =

German Jewish merchant, a doctor of chemistry, and a soldier

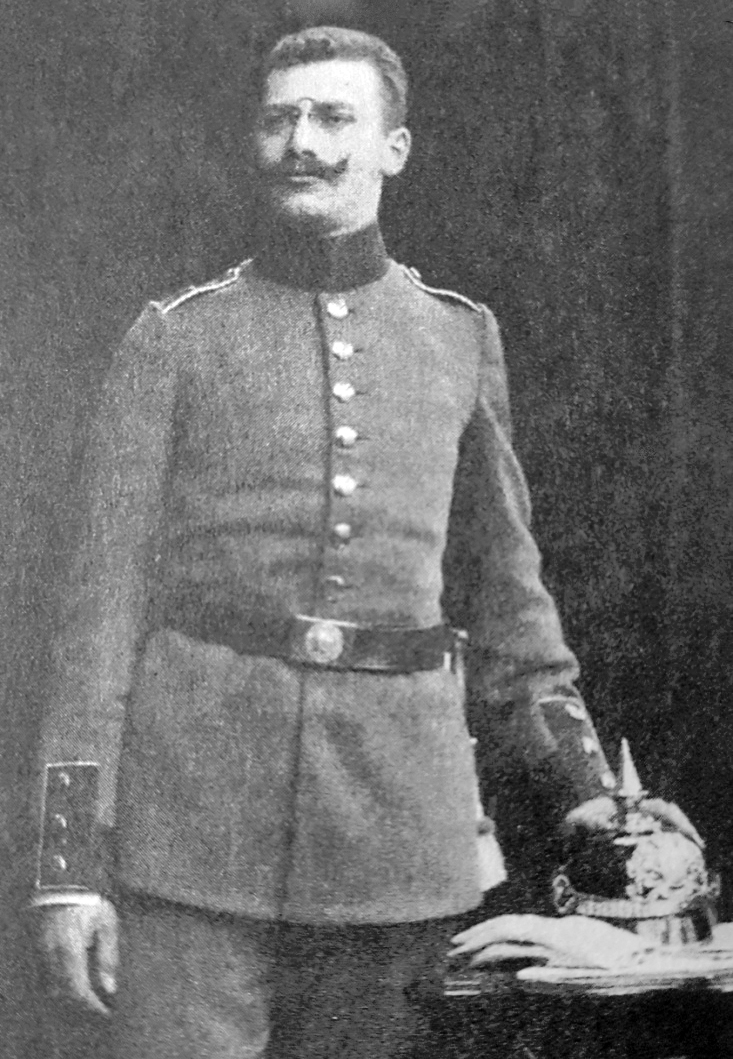
- Leo Levy drafted into military service (1915)
- Born: September 19, 1881; Połczyn-Zdrój
- Died: November 10, 1938 (aged 57); Połczyn-Zdrój
- Occupation(s): merchant, financier
- Honours: Iron Cross; Military Merit Order

Leo Levy (born 19 September 1881 in Połczyn-Zdrój, died 10 November 1938 in Połczyn-Zdrój) was a German merchant from the Jewish Levy family, a doctor of chemistry, and a soldier in Wilhelm II's Imperial Army during World War I. He was a wealthy townsman who was murdered in his home by the Sturmabteilung during Kristallnacht.

== Biography ==
=== Origins ===
The ancestors of Leo Levy settled in Greater Poland during the 18th century. They faced numerous restrictions, including prohibitions on purchasing land, employing Christians, and other significant limitations. They were also denied the status of Schutzjuden (protected Jews under special patronage).

On 14 June 1744, Ascher Ben Yechazkiel Halevi was born. In Greater Poland, he bore the surname Ben Yechazkiel Halevi but later adopted the name Berisch Ascher. In 1765, he married Feigel Gitel Bat Yehuda Mosche, a member of the Horowitz family.

Berisch Ascher's family eventually emigrated to Western Pomerania (then known as Farther Pomerania, German: Hinterpommern), where subsequent generations resided in Połczyn-Zdrój (German: Polzin, later Bad Polzin) during the 19th and 20th centuries. The Levy lineage spans five generations: Berisch Ascher, Ascher Jäckel/Ascher Jakob Levy, Ascher Levy, Bernhard Levy, and Leo Levy.

=== Leo Levy ===
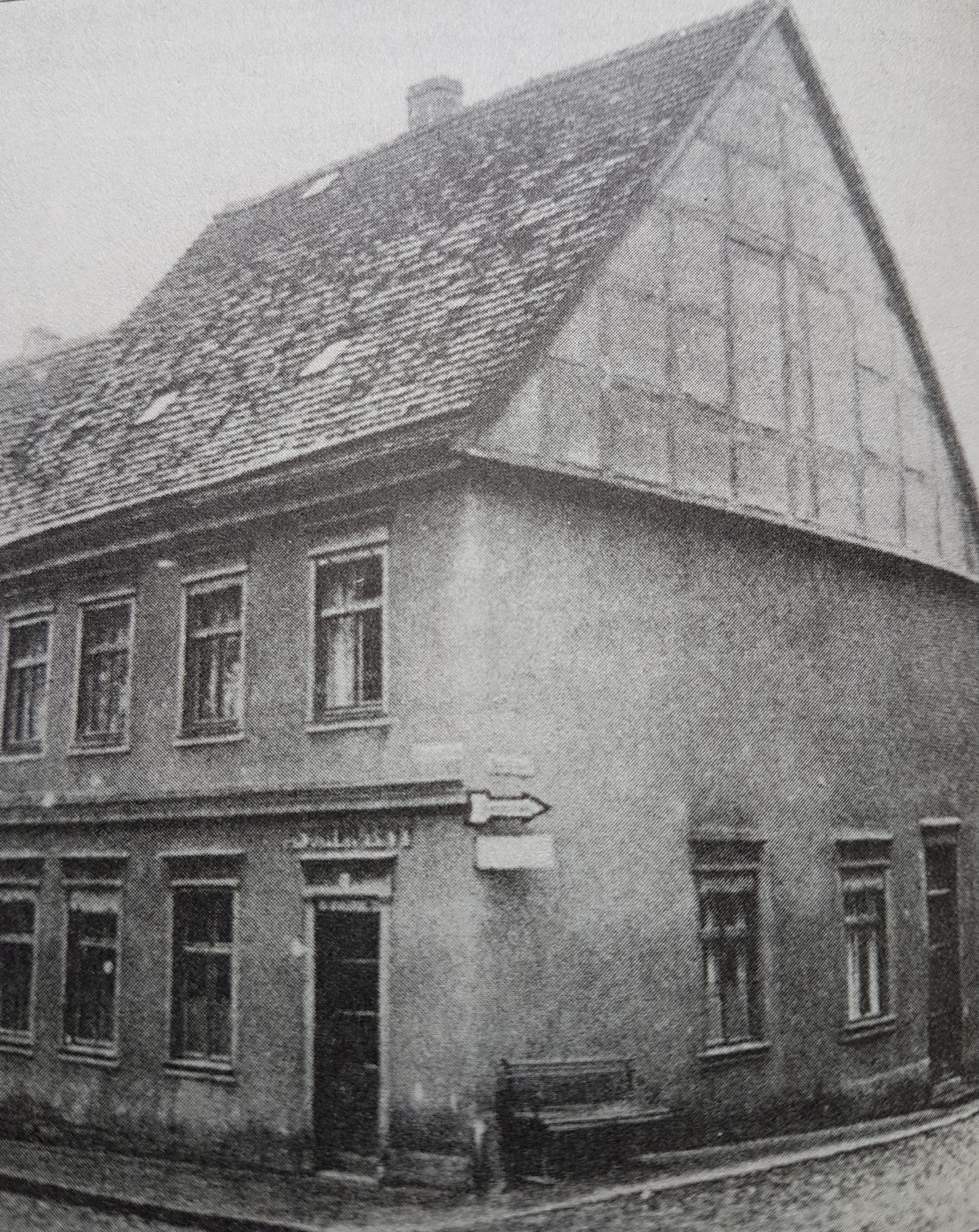
Połczyn-Zdrój. Leo's family home

Leo Levy was born on 19 September 1881 in Połczyn-Zdrój. His father was Bernhard Levy, his grandfather Ascher Levy, and his great-grandfather Ascher Jäckel-Levy. He attended the Jewish school on Targowa Street (no longer in existence) and the public school built in 1866 on Grunwaldzka Street. His education included religious studies (reading the Torah, learning to read and write in Hebrew), singing, gymnastics, and subjects taught at the public school. Classes were held daily except for Friday afternoons and Saturdays. Under his father's guidance, Leo also gained knowledge of finance, accounting, and the principles of running the family business. The family lived in a two-story house on 5 Marca Street (German: Brunnenstrasse) in Połczyn, purchased in 1842 by Ascher and Fanny Levy for 1,300 thalers from the von Manteuffel family.

From 1899 onward, Leo lived in a large house on Zdrojowa Street, where his father gradually acquired an entire floor, which had previously served as a sanatorium. Leo resided there with his parents and four siblings: Lina, Ernst, Siegfried, and Ida, later joined by his wife and daughters. Until 1938, the family occupied the entire floor. The business headquarters, however, remained on 5 Marca Street.

In 1899, at the age of 18, Leo was sent to London to continue his education at Linck Moeller, a company specializing in the timber trade. Simultaneously, he pursued a chemistry degree at the prestigious Heidelberg University. Upon graduation, he was awarded a doctorate in chemistry.

At the start of the 20th century, Połczyn-Zdrój had a population of 6,000, including 40 Jewish families, among them Leo's family.

=== Leo and Else Levy's family ===
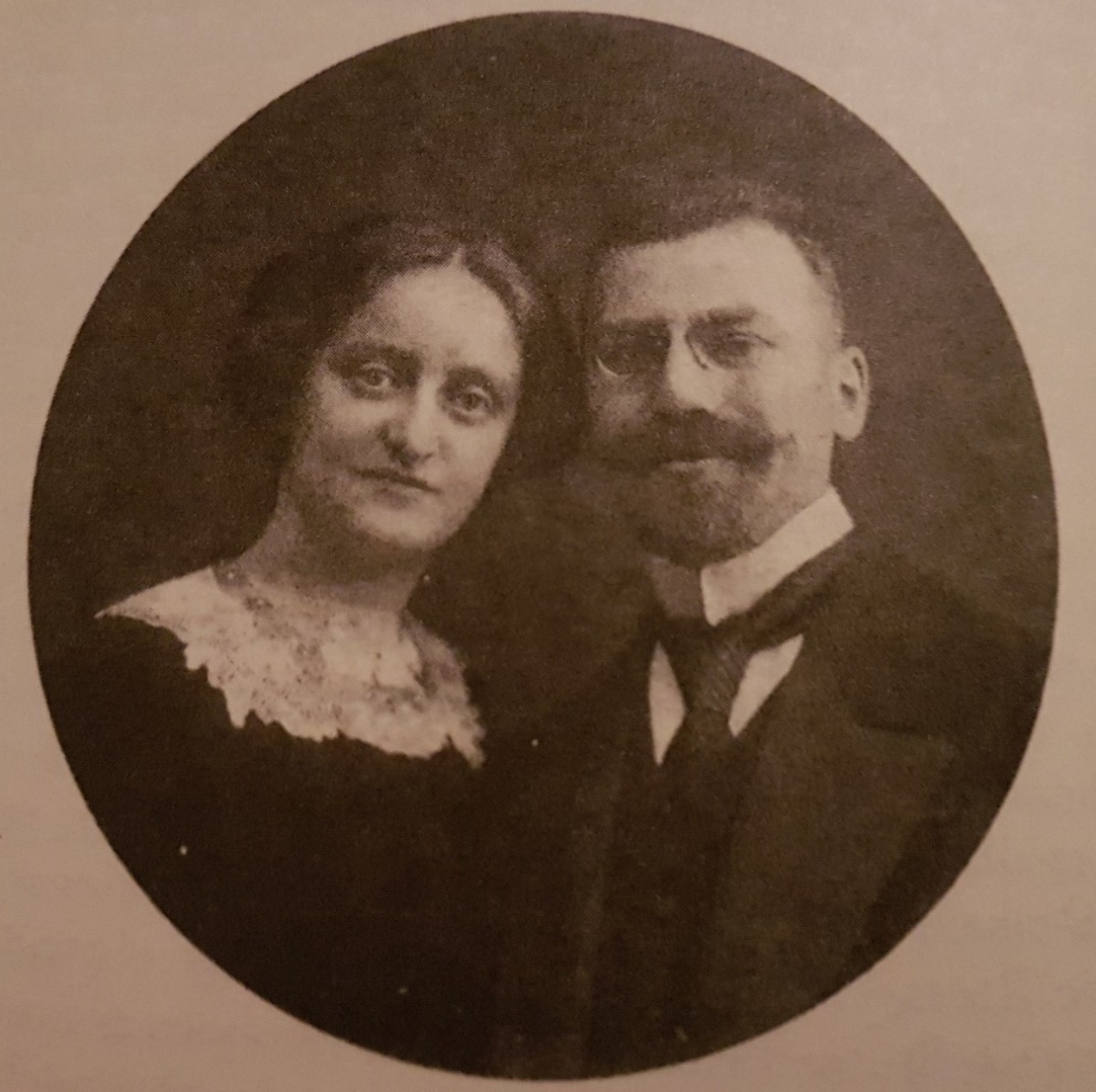
Else Levy (née Frensdorf) and Leo Levy

In 1913, Leo Levy married Else Frensdorf, a woman from a traditional Jewish family in Hanover. Some sources suggest the marriage may have occurred in 1911 when Leo turned 30. The couple led a peaceful, harmonious life. Leo deeply valued his wife and was devoted to his family.

Leo and his older brother Siegfried assisted their father in managing the family business, eventually becoming co-owners. The company operated in diverse sectors, including grain and agricultural trade, lumber sales, banking (holding shares in the Leipzig–Magdeburg railway line), and the railway enterprise constructing the Stargard–Koszalin line. Due to his passion for chemistry, Leo took particular interest in the limeworks in Grzmiąca.

On the Shabbat of 1 August 1914, Leo reflected on the significance of the Tisha B'Av holiday and offered prayers for Emperor Wilhelm II in light of the outbreak of war. In the absence of a rabbi in Połczyn-Zdrój, Leo led synagogue prayers, a responsibility previously fulfilled by his father and grandfather.

In September 1914, at age 33, Leo was drafted into the military. His brother Siegfried, deemed unfit for service by the draft board, took over the business. Leo's cousin, Rudolf Levy, served as a driver in the 117th Infantry Division on the Western Front, earning the Iron Cross for his actions during the battles in Artois. Leo began his military training at the barracks in Piła (German: Schneidemühle) and was later deployed to a small town in northeastern France, near the front. He was assigned to provisioning duties within the 1st Royal Bavarian Reserve Infantry Brigade, part of the 1st Bavarian Reserve Division and the I Royal Bavarian Reserve Corps, commanded by General of the Infantry Karl von Fasbender. His superior was Captain Tuch, responsible for provisioning the division.

In October 1916, the German army conducted a census of Jews (Judenzählung) to investigate allegations of Jewish unpatriotism and draft evasion. Leo was shocked and outraged by these accusations, having previously believed that the battlefield was free of discrimination. (Note: In the autumn of 1916, approximately 63,000 Jewish soldiers served in the German Army. Of these, 5,000 were stationed in the rear, 28,000 were on the front lines, and 30,000 were in occupation forces. These numbers corresponded proportionally to the percentage of Jews in society. During World War I, nearly one hundred thousand German Jews wore a uniform, and 78% of Jewish soldiers fought on the front. Over 80 of them were awarded the Iron Cross 1st class, and more than 8,000 received the Iron Cross 2nd class (Frister (2007, pp. 207, 214–218)).) In 1918, artillery fire destroyed the buildings housing Leo's unit. The war's outcome was a significant blow to Leo and his family. He attributed the defeat to the restrictions and reparations imposed by the Treaty of Versailles. Leo was discharged from military service three months before the proclamation of the Weimar Republic. He was awarded the Class II Military Merit Order with Crown and received a commendation letter from General Fasbender.

Leo returned to Połczyn-Zdrój on Christmas Eve, 1918. Upon his return, his father, Bernhard, updated him on the company's financial standing. The firm had assets of approximately three million marks in the grain market, invested in bonds, real estate, and a small amount deposited in a bank in Szczecin. Leo continued living with his family on Zdrojowa Street. In 1919, Leo's brother Siegfried moved to Szczecin and later to Berlin. In the spring of 1920, Leo's sister Ida also left, first for Berlin and then to Cologne.

=== After the death of his father ===
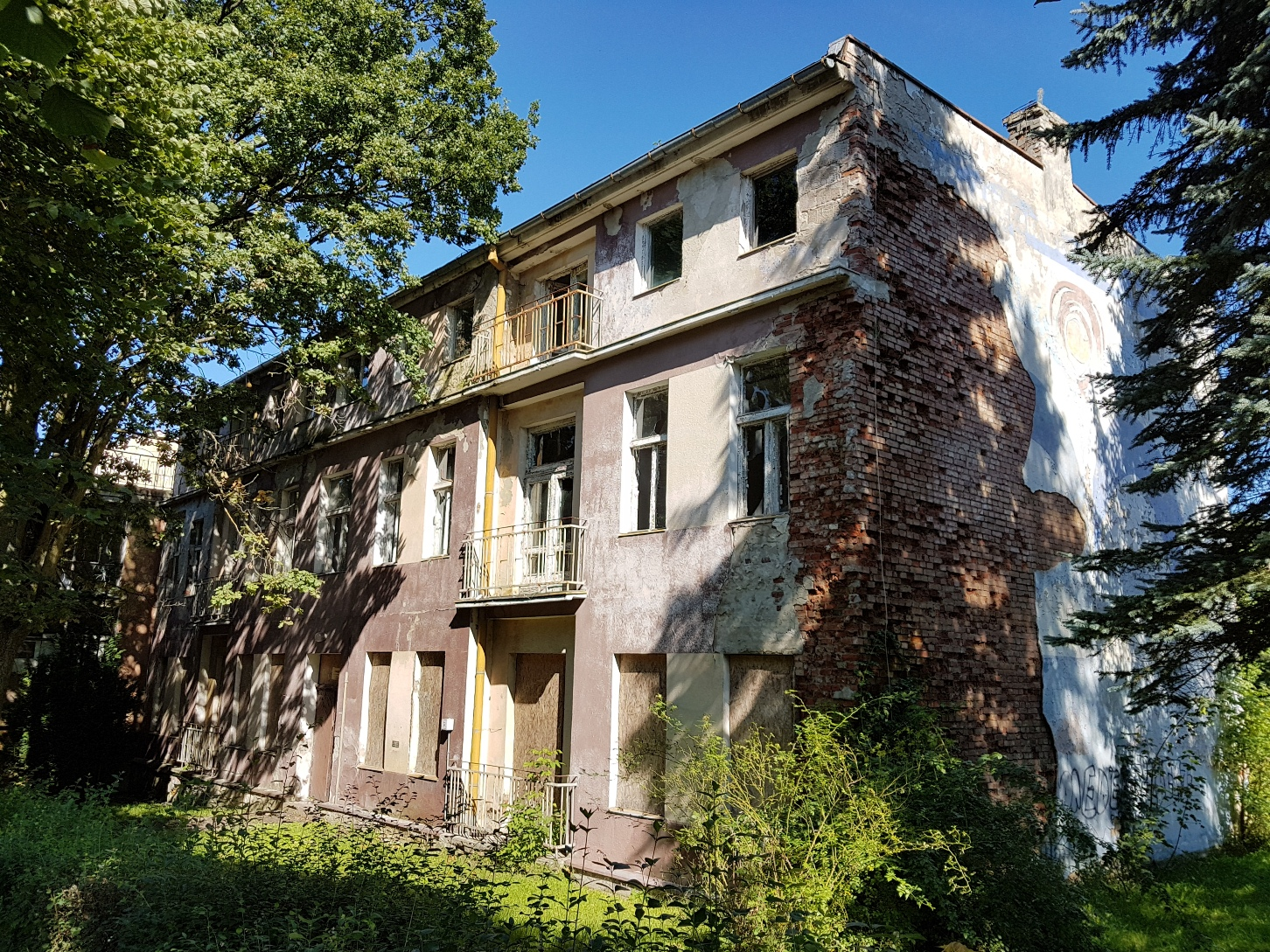
Leo and his family's second home. Currently, 2 Zdrojowa Street

Leo Levy, after the death of his father in 1920, ordered the office to be closed for the period of shiva; family members gathered in the family home, observing the official mourning for a week. Leo became the head of the family and the director of the company. In 1922, Leo's mother Henrietta died. Her funeral was modest and quiet. Due to the war reparations that Germany had to pay to the victors, there was an atmosphere of crisis and defeat in the country. On 20 November 1922, Leo and Siegfried received a loan of one hundred and five hundred thousand marks from the bank, which allowed them to expand the timber business on a large scale. They purchased another sawmill near Koszalin. Leo's daughters, Hannah and Eva, studied at an agricultural school and left for Palestine before the war. According to the will, Leo paid his siblings, Ernst, Ida, and Lina, their rightful share of the inheritance. Leo was known as a righteous, diligent, but also stubborn owner of the company.

In 1926, Polzin changed its name to Bad Polzin. In 1932, there were 120 Jews living in the town, including Leo, his wife Else, and their four daughters: Hannah, Eva, Greta, and Ruth.

=== Leo after 1933 ===
When Adolf Hitler became Chancellor of the Reich in 1933, there were about half a million Jews living in Germany, and their wealth amounted to approximately twelve billion marks. From this moment on, the situation for local Jews began to systematically worsen. Already in 1932, the local Nazi Party branch was the largest and most influential party in Połczyn-Zdrój. Hatred towards Jews became a widespread phenomenon. In the same year, Leo wrote to his brother in Berlin:

Two books will never be on the shelves of my library: "Der Judenstaat" by Theodor Herzl and "Mein Kampf" by Adolf Hitler.

In Połczyn-Zdrój, hostile acts against Jews began to appear, such as the inscription "Jews enter at their own risk", a sign at the entrance to the spa park reading "Dogs and Jews not allowed", and the throwing of a rotten egg into the Levych family's basement room. Leo began wearing a medal indicating that he was a loyal German. In 1933, during the Passover holiday, when the family gathered for the traditional Seder, he, as the head of the family, sat at the head of the table during the festive meal.

On 16 March 1934, his brother Ernst died in Tel Aviv. After Ernst's death, Leo took a short trip to Palestine to visit his niece Thea. In 1935, within two years of Hitler taking power, about twenty-five thousand German Jews left the country, including Leo's three daughters. Eva was taking a course in the Netherlands, Hannah was at an agricultural school in Lithuania, and Gretel was in London working as a teacher. Leo Levy endured the blows with dignity: the loss of the lime kilns in Grzmiąca, the farm in Buślarki, and later the takeover of sawmills in Kołacz, Trzebiec, and Świerczyna. Leo Levy continued to try to be a loyal citizen of the German state until the end. Even when the Nazis came to power in Germany, he still believed that Hitler would not last long.

In 1938, he accompanied his third daughter, Eva, on her way to Palestine. Despite warnings from his loved ones and his brother Siegfried's suggestion to stay in Switzerland, he returned to Połczyn-Zdrój on 7 November 1938, still considering Germany his homeland until the end.

=== Murder of Leo Levy ===
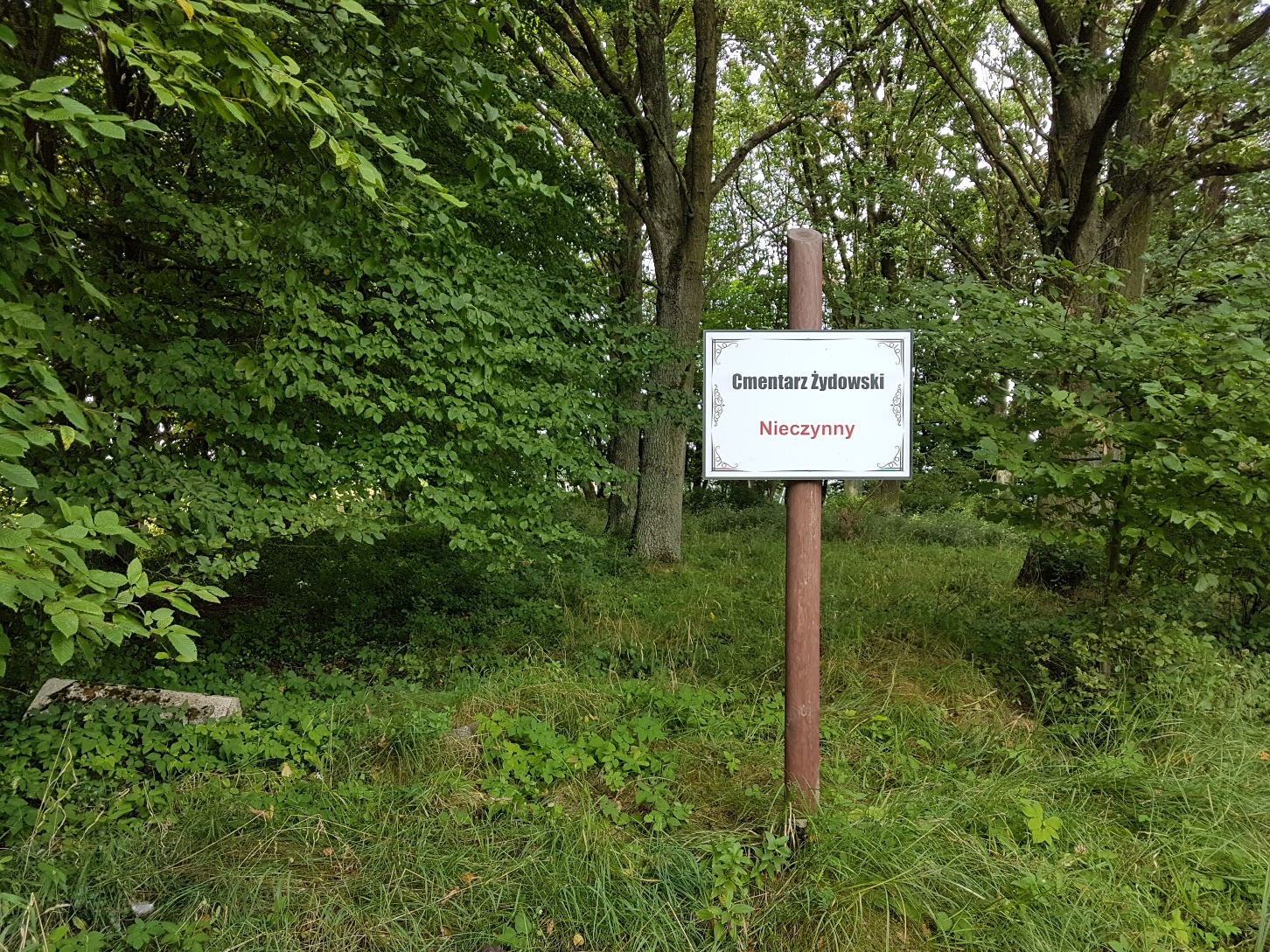
Former Jewish cemetery, where Leo Levy was buried on 12 November 1938

The day before Kristallnacht, Leo Levy dismissed one of his employees, an assistant accountant named Franz, who was a member of the Gestapo. On 10 November 1938, at 4 AM, just days after his return from Palestine, Leo was murdered in his room at the house on Zdrojowa Street (Bismarck Prommenade) by the Sturmabteilung. One version of the story says that Franz entered his apartment with two Sturmabteilung members, who shot him as soon as Levy opened the door. Leo's wife, Else, informed their youngest daughter, Ruth, who arrived several hours later from Berlin to Połczyn-Zdrój. The family secretly buried him at the local cemetery. Ruth arranged the funeral, and two Christian gravediggers dug the grave. There was no man present who could recite the Kaddish, and only Else and Ruth prayed at the grave.

Leo Levy was the last male descendant of the Levy family from Pomerania. He loved his homeland while being fully aware of his Jewish heritage and his attachment to religious rituals. He embodied a dual cultural patriotism, sharing his respect between two traditions: the Prussian state and Hebrew heritage. On his grave, Else had the following words engraved: "Here rests Leo Levy, who died an honest death, for he lived an honest life".

== Bibliography ==
- Frister, Roman (2007). Miłość niemożliwa. Aschera Levy'ego tęsknota do Niemiec [Impossible Love: Ascher Levy's Longing for Germany] (in Polish). Translated by Klingofer, Anna. Warsaw: Państwowy Instytut Wydawniczy. ISBN 978-83-06-03095-2.
- Chmielewski, Tomasz (2015). Połczyn-Zdrój i okolice [Połczyn-Zdrój and Surroundings] (in Polish). Połczyn-Zdrój: PHU Eko-Map. ISBN 978-83-60286-86-9.
