= Bolkowo =

- Village
- Location within Poland
- Coordinates: 53°51′N 16°4′E
- Country: Poland
- Voivodeship: West Pomeranian
- County: Świdwin
- Gmina: Połczyn-Zdrój

Bolkowo [bɔlˈkɔvɔ] (German: Bolkow) is a village in the administrative district of Gmina Połczyn-Zdrój, within Świdwin County, West Pomeranian Voivodeship, in north-western Poland. It lies approximately 10 km (6 mi) north of Połczyn-Zdrój, 22 km (14 mi) east of Świdwin, and 110 km (68 mi) north-east of the regional capital Szczecin.

== See also ==
- History of Pomerania
