= Ostre Bardo, West Pomeranian Voivodeship =

Ostre Bardo
- Village
- Location within Poland
- Coordinates: 53°50′N 16°7′E
- Country: Poland
- Voivodeship: West Pomeranian
- County: Świdwin
- Gmina: Połczyn-Zdrój

Ostre Bardo [ˈɔstrɛ ˈbardɔ] (German: Wusterbarth) is a village in the administrative district of Gmina Połczyn-Zdrój, within Świdwin County, West Pomeranian Voivodeship, in north-western Poland. It lies approximately 8 km (5 mi) north of Połczyn-Zdrój, 24 km (15 mi) east of Świdwin, and 112 km (70 mi) north-east of the regional capital Szczecin.

For the history of the region, see History of Pomerania.
