= Nowy Toporzyk =

- Village
- Location within Poland
- Coordinates: 53°42′25″N 16°3′17″E
- Country: Poland
- Voivodeship: West Pomeranian
- County: Świdwin
- Gmina: Połczyn-Zdrój
- Population: 70

Nowy Toporzyk [ˈnɔvɨ tɔˈpɔʐɨk] (formerly German Lankow) is a village in the administrative district of Gmina Połczyn-Zdrój, within Świdwin County, West Pomeranian Voivodeship, in north-western Poland. It lies approximately 8 km (5 mi) south-west of Połczyn-Zdrój, 21 km (13 mi) south-east of Świdwin, and 103 km (64 mi) east of the regional capital Szczecin.

For the history of the region, see History of Pomerania.

The village has a population of 70.
