= Ogrodno =

- Village
- Location within Poland
- Coordinates: 53°44′N 16°8′E
- Country: Poland
- Voivodeship: West Pomeranian
- County: Świdwin
- Gmina: Połczyn-Zdrój

Ogrodno [ɔˈɡrɔdnɔ] (German: Kavelsberg) is a village in the administrative district of Gmina Połczyn-Zdrój, within Świdwin County, West Pomeranian Voivodeship, in north-western Poland. It lies approximately 5 km (3 mi) south-east of Połczyn-Zdrój, 25 km (16 mi) east of Świdwin, and 109 km (68 mi) east of the regional capital Szczecin.

For the history of the region, see History of Pomerania.
