= Ostrowąs, West Pomeranian Voivodeship =

Ostrowąs
- Village
- Location within Poland
- Coordinates: 53°45′14″N 16°3′13″E
- Country: Poland
- Voivodeship: West Pomeranian
- County: Świdwin
- Gmina: Połczyn-Zdrój
- Population: 30

Ostrowąs [ɔsˈtrɔvɔ̃s] (German: Wusterhansberg) is a village in the administrative district of Gmina Połczyn-Zdrój, within Świdwin County, West Pomeranian Voivodeship, in north-western Poland. It lies approximately 4 km (2 mi) south-west of Połczyn-Zdrój, 20 km (12 mi) east of Świdwin, and 105 km (65 mi) east of the regional capital Szczecin. The village has a population of 30.

== See also ==
- History of Pomerania
