= Popielewko =

- Village
- Location within Poland
- Coordinates: 53°45′29″N 16°9′24″E
- Country: Poland
- Voivodeship: West Pomeranian
- County: Świdwin
- Gmina: Połczyn-Zdrój
- Population: 160

Popielewko [pɔpjɛˈlɛfkɔ] (German: Klein Poplow) is a village in the administrative district of Gmina Połczyn-Zdrój, within Świdwin County, West Pomeranian Voivodeship, in north-western Poland. It lies approximately 4 km (2 mi) east of Połczyn-Zdrój, 26 km (16 mi) east of Świdwin, and 111 km (69 mi) east of the regional capital Szczecin. The village has a population of 160.

== See also ==
- History of Pomerania
