= Wardyń Górny =

- Village
- Location within Poland
- Coordinates: 53°47′N 16°1′E
- Country: Poland
- Voivodeship: West Pomeranian
- County: Świdwin
- Gmina: Połczyn-Zdrój

Wardyń Górny [ˈvardɨɲ ˈɡurnɨ] (German Hohenwardin) is a village in the administrative district of Gmina Połczyn-Zdrój, within Świdwin County, West Pomeranian Voivodeship, in north-western Poland. It lies approximately 6 km (4 mi) west of Połczyn-Zdrój, 17 km (11 mi) east of Świdwin, and 104 km (65 mi) north-east of the regional capital Szczecin.

== See also ==
- History of Pomerania
