= Gaworkowo =

- Village
- Location within Poland
- Coordinates: 53°43′N 16°5′E
- Country: Poland
- Voivodeship: West Pomeranian
- County: Świdwin
- Gmina: Połczyn-Zdrój

Gaworkowo [ɡavɔrˈkɔvɔ] (German: Gauerkow) is a village in the administrative district of Gmina Połczyn-Zdrój, within Świdwin County, West Pomeranian Voivodeship, in north-western Poland. It lies approximately 6 km (4 mi) south of Połczyn-Zdrój, 23 km (14 mi) east of Świdwin, and 105 km (65 mi) east of the regional capital Szczecin.
