= Dziwogóra =

- Village
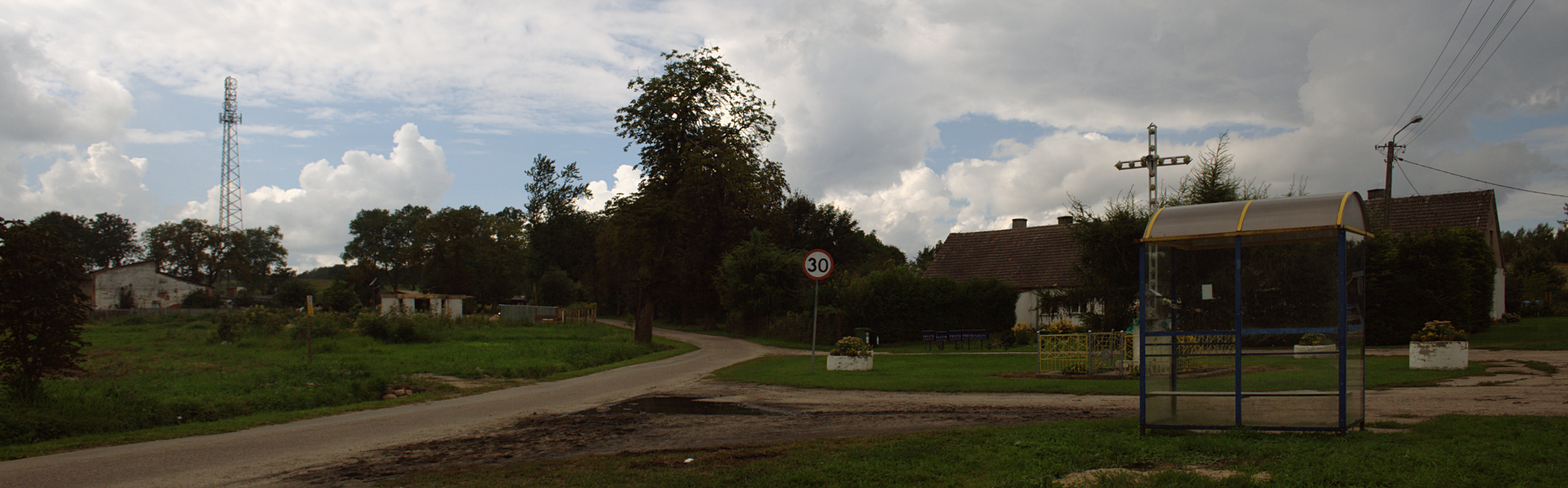

- Location within Poland
- Coordinates: 53°47′1″N 16°2′46″E
- Country: Poland
- Voivodeship: West Pomeranian
- County: Świdwin
- Gmina: Połczyn-Zdrój

Population
  - Total: 170
- Time zone: UTC+1 (CET)
  - Summer (DST): UTC+2 (CEST)

Dziwogóra [d͡ʑivɔˈɡura] (German: Dewsberg) is a village in the administrative district of Gmina Połczyn-Zdrój, within Świdwin County, West Pomeranian Voivodeship, in north-western Poland. It lies approximately 5 km (3 mi) north-west of Połczyn-Zdrój, 19 km (12 mi) east of Świdwin, and 105 km (65 mi) north-east of the regional capital Szczecin.

The village has a population of 170.

== History ==
During World War II, the German administration operated a forced labour subcamp of the Stalag II-D prisoner-of-war camp in the village.
