= Żołędno =

- Settlement
- Location within Poland
- Coordinates: 53°46′55″N 15°59′40″E
- Country: Poland
- Voivodeship: West Pomeranian
- County: Świdwin
- Gmina: Połczyn-Zdrój

Żołędno [ʐɔˈwɛndnɔ] (German: Eichmühle) is a settlement in the administrative district of Gmina Połczyn-Zdrój, within Świdwin County, West Pomeranian Voivodeship, in north-western Poland. It lies approximately 8 km (5 mi) west of Połczyn-Zdrój, 15 km (9 mi) east of Świdwin, and 102 km (63 mi) north-east of the regional capital Szczecin.

== See also ==
- History of Pomerania
