= Skarbimierz, West Pomeranian Voivodeship =

Skarbimierz
- Settlement
- Location within Poland
- Coordinates: 53°42′18″N 16°0′33″E
- Country: Poland
- Voivodeship: West Pomeranian
- County: Świdwin
- Gmina: Połczyn-Zdrój

Skarbimierz [skarˈbimjɛʂ] is a settlement in the administrative district of Gmina Połczyn-Zdrój, within Świdwin County, West Pomeranian Voivodeship, in north-western Poland. It lies approximately 10 km (6 mi) south-west of Połczyn-Zdrój, 19 km (12 mi) south-east of Świdwin, and 100 km (62 mi) east of the regional capital Szczecin.

== See also ==
- History of Pomerania
