= Łęgi, Świdwin County =

Łęgi
- Village
- Location within Poland
- Coordinates: 53°47′N 15°57′E
- Country: Poland
- Voivodeship: West Pomeranian
- County: Świdwin
- Gmina: Połczyn-Zdrój

Łęgi [ˈwɛnɡi] (German: Langen) is a village in the administrative district of Gmina Połczyn-Zdrój, within Świdwin County, West Pomeranian Voivodeship, in north-western Poland. It lies approximately 11 km (7 mi) west of Połczyn-Zdrój, 13 km (8 mi) east of Świdwin, and 100 km (62 mi) north-east of the regional capital Szczecin.

For the history of the region, see History of Pomerania.

== Notable residents ==
- Albrecht von Hagen (1904 – 1944), resistance fighter
