= Tychówko, Świdwin County =

Tychówko
- Settlement
- Location within Poland
- Coordinates: 53°53′38″N 16°4′14″E
- Country: Poland
- Voivodeship: West Pomeranian
- County: Świdwin
- Gmina: Połczyn-Zdrój
- Population: 310

Tychówko [tɨˈxufkɔ] (German: Woldisch Tychow) is a settlement in the administrative district of Gmina Połczyn-Zdrój, within Świdwin County, West Pomeranian Voivodeship, in north-western Poland. It lies approximately 15 km (9 mi) north of Połczyn-Zdrój, 24 km (15 mi) north-east of Świdwin, and 112 km (70 mi) north-east of the regional capital Szczecin.

For the history of the region, see History of Pomerania.

The settlement has a population of 310.

== Notable residents ==
- Max Wagenknecht (1857–1922), composer of organ and piano music
