= Imienko =

- Settlement
- Location within Poland
- Coordinates: 53°42′55″N 15°57′41″E
- Country: Poland
- Voivodeship: West Pomeranian
- County: Świdwin
- Gmina: Połczyn-Zdrój

Imienko [iˈmjɛnkɔ] is a settlement in the administrative district of Gmina Połczyn-Zdrój, within Świdwin County, West Pomeranian Voivodeship, in north-western Poland. It lies approximately 11 km (7 mi) south-west of Połczyn-Zdrój, 15 km (9 mi) south-east of Świdwin, and 97 km (60 mi) east of the regional capital Szczecin.

For the history of the region, see History of Pomerania.
