= Kłokówko =

- Settlement
- Location within Poland
- Coordinates: 53°43′27″N 16°4′43″E
- Country: Poland
- Voivodeship: West Pomeranian
- County: Świdwin
- Gmina: Połczyn-Zdrój
- Population: 20

Kłokówko [kwɔˈkufkɔ] (German: Kolonie Klockow) is a settlement in the administrative district of Gmina Połczyn-Zdrój, within Świdwin County, West Pomeranian Voivodeship, in north-western Poland. It lies approximately 5 km (3 mi) south of Połczyn-Zdrój, 22 km (14 mi) east of Świdwin, and 105 km (65 mi) east of the regional capital Szczecin.

For the history of the region, see History of Pomerania.

The settlement has a population of 20.
