= Jelonki, Świdwin County =

Jelonki
- Settlement
- Location within Poland
- Coordinates: 53°43′34″N 16°6′34″E
- Country: Poland
- Voivodeship: West Pomeranian
- County: Świdwin
- Gmina: Połczyn-Zdrój
- Population: 30

Jelonki [jɛˈlɔnki] (German: Heinrichshütte) is a settlement in the administrative district of Gmina Połczyn-Zdrój, within Świdwin County, West Pomeranian Voivodeship, in north-western Poland. It lies approximately 5 km (3 mi) south of Połczyn-Zdrój, 24 km (15 mi) east of Świdwin, and 107 km (66 mi) east of the regional capital Szczecin.

For the history of the region, see History of Pomerania.

The settlement has a population of 30.
