= Kapice, West Pomeranian Voivodeship =

Kapice
- Village
- Location within Poland
- Coordinates: 53°40′49″N 15°57′10″E
- Country: Poland
- Voivodeship: West Pomeranian
- County: Świdwin
- Gmina: Połczyn-Zdrój
- Population: 20

Kapice [kaˈpit͡sɛ] (formerly German Kappe) is a village in the administrative district of Gmina Połczyn-Zdrój, within Świdwin County, West Pomeranian Voivodeship, in north-western Poland. It lies approximately 14 km (9 mi) south-west of Połczyn-Zdrój, 17 km (11 mi) south-east of Świdwin, and 96 km (60 mi) east of the regional capital Szczecin.

For the history of the region, see History of Pomerania.

The village has a population of 20.
