= Kołaczek, West Pomeranian Voivodeship =

Kołaczek
- Village
- Location within Poland
- Coordinates: 53°46′44″N 16°12′33″E
- Country: Poland
- Voivodeship: West Pomeranian
- County: Świdwin
- Gmina: Połczyn-Zdrój
- Population: 80

Kołaczek [kɔˈwat͡ʂɛk] (German: Neu Kollatz) is a village in the administrative district of Gmina Połczyn-Zdrój, within Świdwin County, West Pomeranian Voivodeship, in north-western Poland. It lies approximately 8 km (5 mi) east of Połczyn-Zdrój, 30 km (19 mi) east of Świdwin, and 115 km (71 mi) east of the regional capital Szczecin.

For the history of the region, see History of Pomerania.

The village has a population of 80.
