= Stare Resko =

- Settlement
- Location within Poland
- Coordinates: 53°40′44″N 15°58′31″E
- Country: Poland
- Voivodeship: West Pomeranian
- County: Świdwin
- Gmina: Połczyn-Zdrój
- Population: 100

Stare Resko [ˈstarɛ ˈrɛskɔ] (German: Ritzig) is a settlement in the administrative district of Gmina Połczyn-Zdrój, within Świdwin County, West Pomeranian Voivodeship, in north-western Poland. It lies approximately 13 km (8 mi) south-west of Połczyn-Zdrój, 18 km (11 mi) south-east of Świdwin, and 97 km (60 mi) east of the regional capital Szczecin.

For the history of the region, see History of Pomerania.

The settlement has a population of 100.
