= Połczyńska =

- Village
- Location within Poland
- Coordinates: 53°45′1″N 16°7′25″E
- Country: Poland
- Voivodeship: West Pomeranian
- County: Świdwin
- Gmina: Połczyn-Zdrój

Połczyńska [pɔu̯ˈt͡ʂɨɲska] is a village in the administrative district of Gmina Połczyn-Zdrój, within Świdwin County, West Pomeranian Voivodeship, in north-western Poland. It lies approximately 3 km (2 mi) south-east of Połczyn-Zdrój, 24 km (15 mi) east of Świdwin, and 109 km (68 mi) east of the regional capital Szczecin.

== See also ==
- History of Pomerania
