= Nowe Resko =

- Village
- Location within Poland
- Coordinates: 53°42′N 15°58′E
- Country: Poland
- Voivodeship: West Pomeranian
- County: Świdwin
- Gmina: Połczyn-Zdrój

Nowe Resko [ˈnɔvɛ ˈrɛskɔ] (German Ritzig) is a village in the administrative district of Gmina Połczyn-Zdrój, within Świdwin County, West Pomeranian Voivodeship, in north-western Poland. It lies approximately 12 km (7 mi) south-west of Połczyn-Zdrój, 17 km (11 mi) south-east of Świdwin, and 97 km (60 mi) east of the regional capital Szczecin.

For the history of the region, see History of Pomerania.
