= Kocury, West Pomeranian Voivodeship =

Kocury
- Village
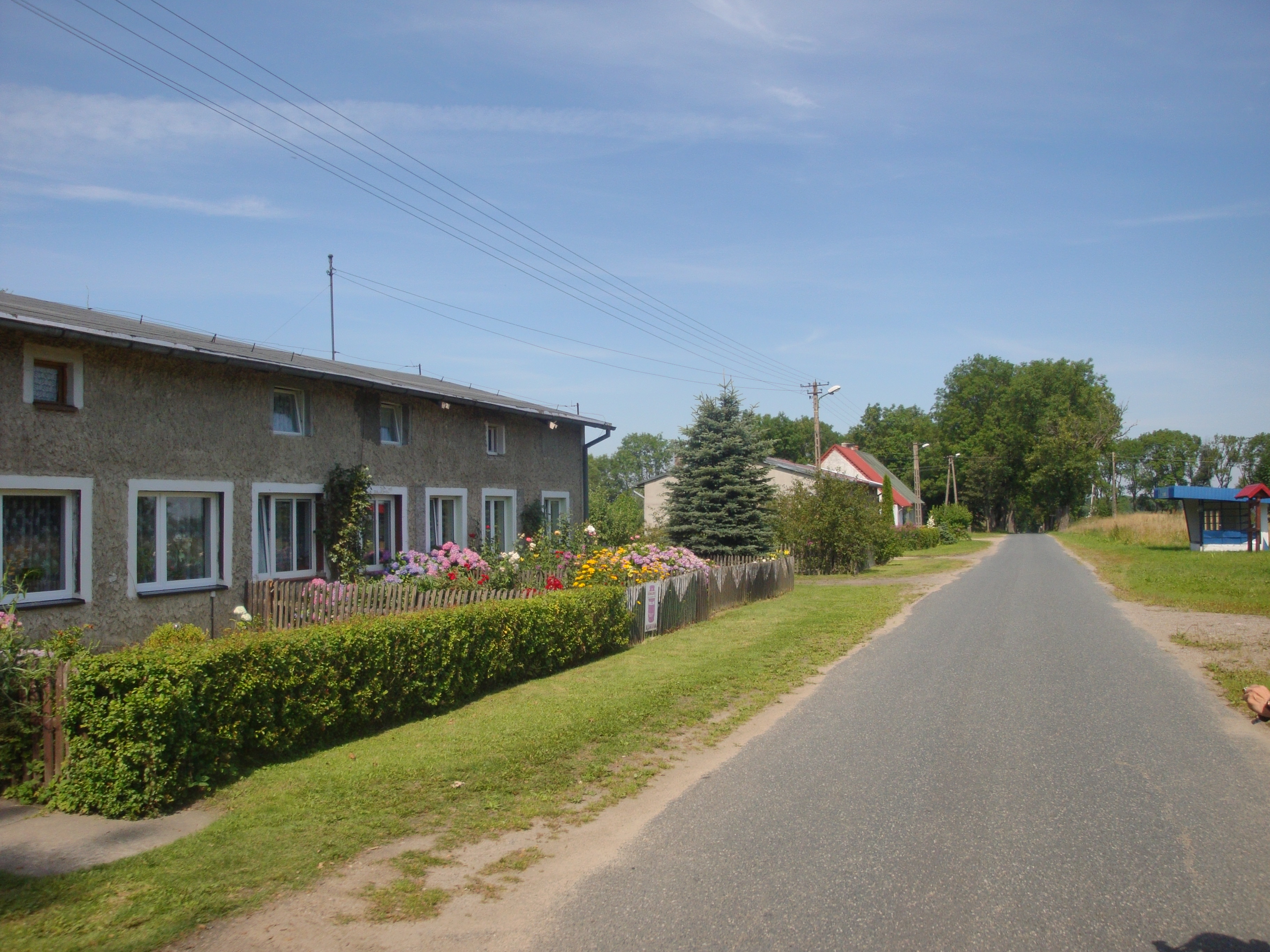

- Location within Poland
- Coordinates: 53°42′1″N 16°13′58″E
- Country: Poland
- Voivodeship: West Pomeranian
- County: Świdwin
- Gmina: Połczyn-Zdrój
- Population: 80

Kocury [kɔˈt͡surɨ] (German: Hagenhorst) is a village in the administrative district of Gmina Połczyn-Zdrój, within Świdwin County, West Pomeranian Voivodeship, in north-western Poland. It lies approximately 12 km (7 mi) south-east of Połczyn-Zdrój, 33 km (21 mi) east of Świdwin, and 114 km (71 mi) east of the regional capital Szczecin.

For the history of the region, see History of Pomerania.

The village has a population of 80.
