= Borucino, West Pomeranian Voivodeship =

Borucino
- Village
- Location within Poland
- Coordinates: 53°45′24″N 16°1′49″E
- Country: Poland
- Voivodeship: West Pomeranian
- County: Świdwin
- Gmina: Połczyn-Zdrój
- Population: 20

Borucino [bɔruˈt͡ɕinɔ] (German: Brosland) is a village in the administrative district of Gmina Połczyn-Zdrój, within Świdwin County, West Pomeranian Voivodeship, in north-western Poland. It lies approximately 5 km (3 mi) west of Połczyn-Zdrój, 18 km (11 mi) east of Świdwin, and 103 km (64 mi) east of the regional capital Szczecin. The village has a population of 20.

== See also ==
- History of Pomerania
