= Popielawy, West Pomeranian Voivodeship =

Popielawy
- Settlement
- Location within Poland
- Coordinates: 53°45′49″N 16°11′12″E
- Country: Poland
- Voivodeship: West Pomeranian
- County: Świdwin
- Gmina: Połczyn-Zdrój
- Population: 10

Popielawy [pɔpjɛˈlavɨ] (German: Poplower Mühle) is a settlement in the administrative district of Gmina Połczyn-Zdrój, within Świdwin County, West Pomeranian Voivodeship, in north-western Poland. It lies approximately 6 km (4 mi) east of Połczyn-Zdrój, 28 km (17 mi) east of Świdwin, and 113 km (70 mi) east of the regional capital Szczecin. The settlement has a population of 10.

== See also ==
- History of Pomerania
