= Buślary =

- Village
- Location within Poland
- Coordinates: 53°48′N 16°4′E
- Country: Poland
- Voivodeship: West Pomeranian
- County: Świdwin
- Gmina: Połczyn-Zdrój

Buślary [buˈɕlarɨ] (German Buslar) is a village in the administrative district of Gmina Połczyn-Zdrój, within Świdwin County, West Pomeranian Voivodeship, in north-western Poland. It lies approximately 5 km (3 mi) north-west of Połczyn-Zdrój, 20 km (12 mi) east of Świdwin, and 107 km (66 mi) north-east of the regional capital Szczecin.

== See also ==
- History of Pomerania
