= Bronowo, West Pomeranian Voivodeship =

Bronowo
- Village
- Location within Poland
- Coordinates: 53°43′N 15°58′E
- Country: Poland
- Voivodeship: West Pomeranian
- County: Świdwin
- Gmina: Połczyn-Zdrój

Bronowo [brɔˈnɔvɔ] (German Brunow) is a village in the administrative district of Gmina Połczyn-Zdrój, within Świdwin County, West Pomeranian Voivodeship, in north-western Poland. It lies approximately 11 km (7 mi) south-west of Połczyn-Zdrój, 16 km (10 mi) south-east of Świdwin, and 98 km (61 mi) east of the regional capital Szczecin.

== See also ==
- History of Pomerania
