= Dobino, Świdwin County =

Dobino
- Settlement
- Location within Poland
- Coordinates: 53°42′46″N 16°2′31″E
- Country: Poland
- Voivodeship: West Pomeranian
- County: Świdwin
- Gmina: Połczyn-Zdrój
- Population: 90

Dobino [dɔˈbinɔ] (German: Althütten) is a settlement in the administrative district of Gmina Połczyn-Zdrój, within Świdwin County, West Pomeranian Voivodeship, in north-western Poland. It lies approximately 8 km (5 mi) south-west of Połczyn-Zdrój, 20 km (12 mi) south-east of Świdwin, and 102 km (63 mi) east of the regional capital Szczecin.

For the history of the region, see History of Pomerania.

The settlement has a population of 90.
