= Zaborze, Świdwin County =

Zaborze
- Village
- Location within Poland
- Coordinates: 53°48′13″N 16°8′19″E
- Country: Poland
- Voivodeship: West Pomeranian
- County: Świdwin
- Gmina: Połczyn-Zdrój
- Population: 60

Zaborze [zaˈbɔʐɛ] (German: Waldhof) is a village in the administrative district of Gmina Połczyn-Zdrój, within Świdwin County, West Pomeranian Voivodeship, in north-western Poland. It lies approximately 5 km (3 mi) north-east of Połczyn-Zdrój, 25 km (16 mi) east of Świdwin, and 112 km (70 mi) north-east of the regional capital Szczecin. The village has a population of 60.
