= Łąkówko =

- Settlement
- Location within Poland
- Coordinates: 53°52′28″N 16°6′24″E
- Country: Poland
- Voivodeship: West Pomeranian
- County: Świdwin
- Gmina: Połczyn-Zdrój
- Population: 10

Łąkówko [wɔnˈkufkɔ] (German Lankow) is a settlement in the administrative district of Gmina Połczyn-Zdrój, within Świdwin County, West Pomeranian Voivodeship, in north-western Poland. It lies approximately 12 km (7 mi) north of Połczyn-Zdrój, 25 km (16 mi) north-east of Świdwin, and 113 km (70 mi) north-east of the regional capital Szczecin.

For the history of the region, see History of Pomerania.

The settlement has a population of 10.
