= Wardyń Dolny =

- Settlement
- Location within Poland
- Coordinates: 53°46′24″N 16°0′7″E
- Country: Poland
- Voivodeship: West Pomeranian
- County: Świdwin
- Gmina: Połczyn-Zdrój
- Population: 200

Wardyń Dolny [ˈvardɨɲ ˈdɔlnɨ] (German: Groß Wardin) is a settlement in the administrative district of Gmina Połczyn-Zdrój, within Świdwin County, West Pomeranian Voivodeship, in north-western Poland. It lies approximately 7 km (4 mi) west of Połczyn-Zdrój, 16 km (10 mi) east of Świdwin, and 102 km (63 mi) north-east of the regional capital Szczecin.

For the history of the region, see History of Pomerania.

The settlement has a population of 200.
