= Nowe Ludzicko =

- Village
- Location within Poland
- Coordinates: 53°47′41″N 16°2′39″E
- Country: Poland
- Voivodeship: West Pomeranian
- County: Świdwin
- Gmina: Połczyn-Zdrój
- Population: 280

Nowe Ludzicko [ˈnɔvɛ luˈd͡ʑit͡skɔ] (German: Neu Lutzig) is a village in the administrative district of Gmina Połczyn-Zdrój, within Świdwin County, West Pomeranian Voivodeship, in north-western Poland. It lies approximately 5 km (3 mi) north-west of Połczyn-Zdrój, 19 km (12 mi) east of Świdwin, and 106 km (66 mi) north-east of the regional capital Szczecin.

For the history of the region, see History of Pomerania.

The village has a population of 280.
