= Widów, West Pomeranian Voivodeship =

Widów
- Settlement
- Location within Poland
- Coordinates: 53°43′55″N 16°02′43″E
- Country: Poland
- Voivodeship: West Pomeranian
- County: Świdwin
- Gmina: Połczyn-Zdrój

Widów [ˈviduf] is a settlement in the administrative district of Gmina Połczyn-Zdrój, within Świdwin County, West Pomeranian Voivodeship, in north-western Poland.

== See also ==
- History of Pomerania
