= Grabno, Świdwin County =

Grabno
- Settlement
- Location within Poland
- Coordinates: 53°43′28″N 15°59′50″E
- Country: Poland
- Voivodeship: West Pomeranian
- County: Świdwin
- Gmina: Połczyn-Zdrój

Grabno [ˈɡrabnɔ] (German: Rabensberg) is a settlement in the administrative district of Gmina Połczyn-Zdrój, within Świdwin County, West Pomeranian Voivodeship, in north-western Poland.

For the history of the region, see History of Pomerania.
