= Gromnik =

Gromnik may refer to:

- Gromnik, Lesser Poland Voivodeship, a village in Poland
- Gromnik, West Pomeranian Voivodeship, a settlement in Poland
- Gmina Gromnik, an administrative district in Poland
- Gromnik (hill), a hill in Poland
- Gromnik (divinatory book), a Russian work of astrology
