= Rzęsna =

- Village
- Location within Poland
- Coordinates: 53°44′00″N 16°00′00″E
- Country: Poland
- Voivodeship: West Pomeranian
- County: Świdwin
- Gmina: Połczyn-Zdrój
- Population (2011): 49

Rzęsna [ˈʐɛ̃sna] (German: Vorbruch) is a village in the administrative district of Gmina Połczyn-Zdrój, within Świdwin County, West Pomeranian Voivodeship, in north-western Poland.

The village was reported to have a population of 49 in 2011.
