= Milice, West Pomeranian Voivodeship =

Milice
- Settlement
- Location within Poland
- Coordinates: 53°43′21″N 16°07′53″E
- Country: Poland
- Voivodeship: West Pomeranian
- County: Świdwin
- Gmina: Połczyn-Zdrój

Milice [miˈlit͡sɛ] is a settlement in the administrative district of Gmina Połczyn-Zdrój, within Świdwin County, West Pomeranian Voivodeship, in north-western Poland.
