= Czarnkowie =

- Village
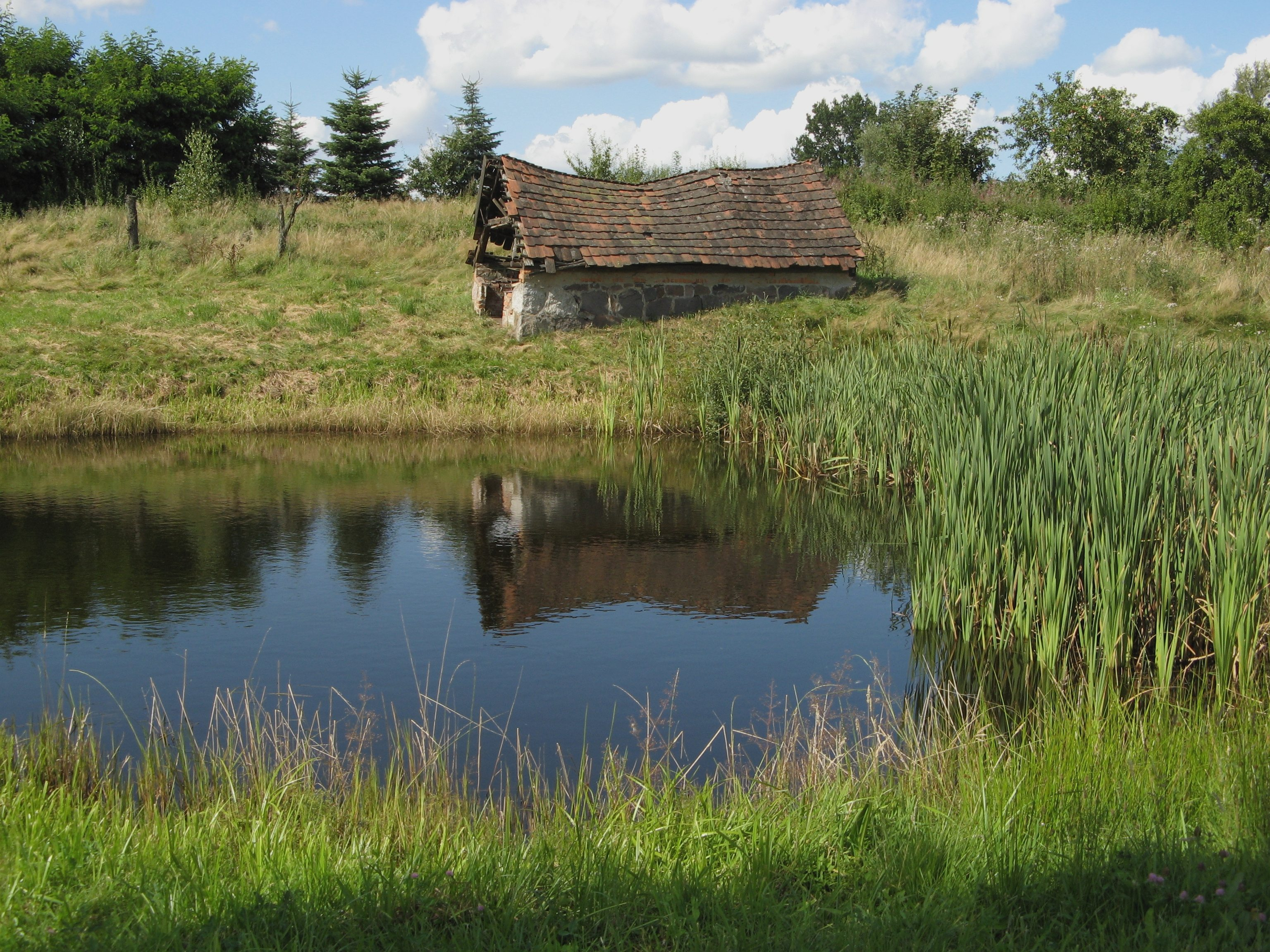
- View from a pond in Czarnkowie

- Location within Poland
- Coordinates: 53°41′06″N 16°09′06″E
- Country: Poland
- Voivodeship: West Pomeranian
- County: Świdwin
- Gmina: Połczyn-Zdrój

Czarnkowie [t͡ʂarnˈkɔvjɛ] is a village in the administrative district of Gmina Połczyn-Zdrój, within Świdwin County, West Pomeranian Voivodeship, in north-western Poland.
