= Kołacz, West Pomeranian Voivodeship =

Kołacz
- Village
- Location within Poland
- Coordinates: 53°47′N 16°11′E
- Country: Poland
- Voivodeship: West Pomeranian
- County: Świdwin
- Gmina: Połczyn-Zdrój

Kołacz [ˈkɔwat͡ʂ] (German Kollatz) is a village in the administrative district of Gmina Połczyn-Zdrój, within Świdwin County, West Pomeranian Voivodeship, in north-western Poland. It lies approximately 6 km (4 mi) east of Połczyn-Zdrój, 28 km (17 mi) east of Świdwin, and 114 km (71 mi) east of the regional capital Szczecin.
