= Popielewice =

- Settlement
- Location within Poland
- Coordinates: 53°44′35″N 16°8′11″E
- Country: Poland
- Voivodeship: West Pomeranian
- County: Świdwin
- Gmina: Połczyn-Zdrój

Popielewice [pɔpjɛlɛˈvit͡sɛ] (German: Vorwerk Poplow) is a settlement in the administrative district of Gmina Połczyn-Zdrój, within Świdwin County, West Pomeranian Voivodeship, in north-western Poland.

== See also ==
- History of Pomerania
