= Gersdorf =

Gersdorf may refer to:

Places:

- in Austria
  - Gersdorf an der Feistritz, in Styria, Austria
- in the Czech Republic
  - Gersdorf, former German name of a village in the Tetschen district, Bohemia
- in Germany:
  - Gersdorf, Saxony, a municipality in the Chemnitzer Land district, Saxony
  - Gersdorf, part of Bahretal, Saxony
  - Gersdorf, part of Haselbachtal, Saxony
  - Gersdorf, part of Ottendorf-Okrilla, Saxony
  - several parts of towns and municipalities
- in Poland:
  - Gersdorf, former German name of Dąbie, Lubusz Voivodeship
  - Gersdorf, former German name of Gawroniec, West Pomeranian Voivodeship

People:

- Ernst Gotthelf Gersdorf, 19th-century German librarian
- Hans von Gersdorff (surgeon), 16th-century German surgeon
- Henriette Catharina von Gersdorff, 17th-century German poet
- Małgorzata Gersdorf (born 1952), Polish judge
