= Porąbka, Świdwin County =

Porąbka
- Settlement
- Location within Poland
- Coordinates: 53°42′11″N 15°58′42″E
- Country: Poland
- Voivodeship: West Pomeranian
- County: Świdwin
- Gmina: Połczyn-Zdrój

Porąbka [pɔˈrɔmpka] (German: Stubbenberg) is a settlement in the administrative district of Gmina Połczyn-Zdrój, within Świdwin County, West Pomeranian Voivodeship, in north-western Poland.

For the history of the region, see History of Pomerania.
