= Głażówka =

- Settlement
- Location within Poland
- Coordinates: 53°45′04″N 16°03′17″E
- Country: Poland
- Voivodeship: (West Pomeranian Voivodeship) West Pomeranian
- County: Świdwin
- Gmina: Połczyn-Zdrój
- Time zone: UTC+01:00 (CET)
  - Summer (DST): UTC+02:00 (CEST)

Głażówka [ɡwaˈʐufka] is a settlement in the administrative district of Gmina Połczyn-Zdrój, within Świdwin County, West Pomeranian Voivodeship, in north-western Poland.
