= Buślarki =

- Village
- Location within Poland
- Coordinates: 53°47′28″N 16°7′35″E
- Country: Poland
- Voivodeship: West Pomeranian
- County: Świdwin
- Gmina: Połczyn-Zdrój
- Population: 30

Buślarki [buˈɕlarki] (German: Neu Buslar) is a village in the administrative district of Gmina Połczyn-Zdrój, within Świdwin County, West Pomeranian Voivodeship, in north-western Poland. It lies approximately 4 km (2 mi) north-east of Połczyn-Zdrój, 24 km (15 mi) east of Świdwin, and 111 km (69 mi) east of the regional capital Szczecin.

The village has a population of 30.

== See also ==
- History of Pomerania
