= Łężek =

Łężek may refer to the following places:

- Łężek, Greater Poland Voivodeship (west-central Poland)
- Łężek, Sławno County in West Pomeranian Voivodeship (north-west Poland)
- Łężek, Świdwin County in West Pomeranian Voivodeship (north-west Poland)

== See also ==
- Discworld characters: Lezek is the innkeeper in Mort
