= Plebanówka =

- Settlement
- Location within Poland
- Coordinates: 53°44′10″N 16°03′33″E
- Country: Poland
- Voivodeship: West Pomeranian
- County: Świdwin
- Gmina: Połczyn-Zdrój

Plebanówka [plɛbaˈnufka] is a settlement in the administrative district of Gmina Połczyn-Zdrój, within Świdwin County, West Pomeranian Voivodeship, in north-western Poland.
