= Grzybnica =

Grzybnica may refer to the Polish settlements:

- Grzybnica, Koszalin County
- Grzybnica, Świdwin County
