= Niemierzyno =

Niemierzyno may refer to the following places:

- Niemierzyno, Szczecinek County in West Pomeranian Voivodeship (north-west Poland)
- Niemierzyno, Gmina Połczyn-Zdrój in West Pomeranian Voivodeship (north-west Poland)
- Niemierzyno, Gmina Świdwin in West Pomeranian Voivodeship (north-west Poland)
