= Zdroje, Świdwin County =

Zdroje
- Settlement
- Location within Poland
- Coordinates: 53°43′37″N 16°08′34″E
- Country: Poland
- Voivodeship: West Pomeranian
- County: Świdwin
- Gmina: Połczyn-Zdrój

Zdroje [ˈzdrɔjɛ] (German: Räubersberg) is a settlement in the administrative district of Gmina Połczyn-Zdrój, within Świdwin County, West Pomeranian Voivodeship, in north-western Poland.
