= Przyrowo =

- Village
- Location within Poland
- Coordinates: 53°46′53″N 16°04′26″E
- Country: Poland
- Voivodeship: West Pomeranian
- County: Świdwin
- Gmina: Połczyn-Zdrój

Przyrowo [pʂɨˈrɔvɔ] is a village in the administrative district of Gmina Połczyn-Zdrój, within Świdwin County, West Pomeranian Voivodeship, in north-western Poland.
