= Karsin, West Pomeranian Voivodeship =

Settlement in Pomerania

Karsin
- Hamlet
- Location within Poland
- Coordinates: 53°43′25″N 16°15′50″E
- Country: Poland
- Voivodeship: West Pomeranian
- County: Świdwin
- Gmina: Połczyn-Zdrój

Karsin [ˈkarɕin] is a hamlet in the administrative district of Gmina Połczyn-Zdrój, within Świdwin County, West Pomeranian Voivodeship, in north-western Poland.
