= Gawroniec, West Pomeranian Voivodeship =

Gawroniec
- Village
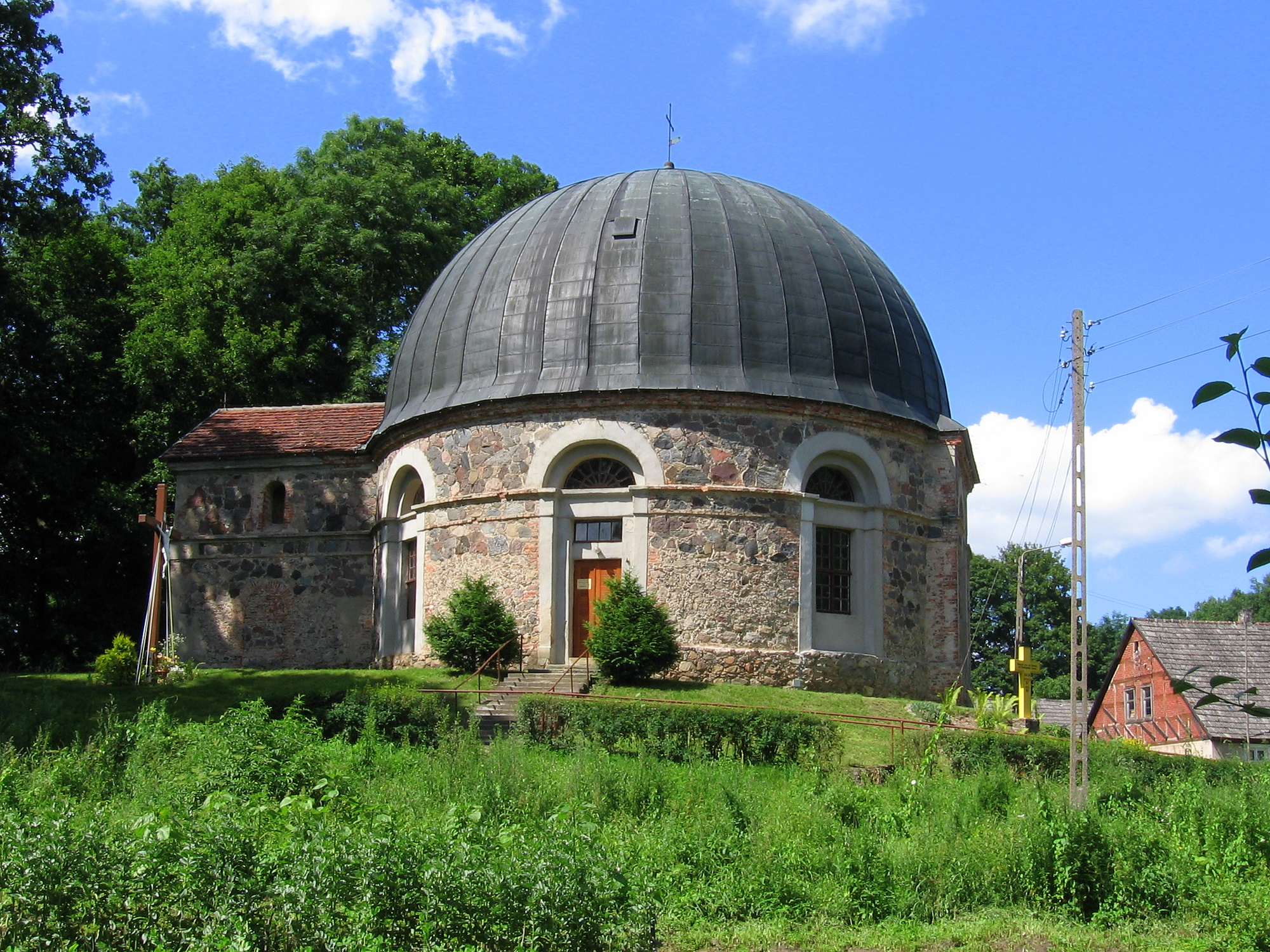
- Roman Catholic Church St. Theresa of the Infant Jesus

- Location within Poland
- Coordinates: 53°40′28″N 16°1′5″E
- Country: Poland
- Voivodeship: West Pomeranian
- County: Świdwin
- Gmina: Połczyn-Zdrój
- Population: 490

Gawroniec [ɡaˈvrɔɲɛt͡s] (German Gersdorf) is a village in the administrative district of Gmina Połczyn-Zdrój, within Świdwin County, West Pomeranian Voivodeship, in north-western Poland. It lies approximately 12 km (7 mi) south-west of Połczyn-Zdrój, 21 km (13 mi) south-east of Świdwin, and 100 km (62 mi) east of the regional capital Szczecin.

The village has a population of 490.

For more on the region's history, see History of Pomerania.

== Notable residents ==
- Friedrich Wilhelm von Borcke (1693–1769), Prussian politician
- Kaspar Wilhelm von Borcke (1704–1747), Prussian politician
- Otto Dann (1937-2014), German historian
