= Borkowo =

Borkowo may refer to the following places:

- Borkowo, Kuyavian-Pomeranian Voivodeship (north-central Poland)
- Borkowo, Masovian Voivodeship (east-central Poland)
- Borkowo, Podlaskie Voivodeship (north-east Poland)
- Borkowo, Kartuzy County in Pomeranian Voivodeship (north Poland)
- Borkowo, Tczew County in Pomeranian Voivodeship (north Poland)
- Borkowo, Sławno County in West Pomeranian Voivodeship (north-west Poland)
- Borkowo, Świdwin County in West Pomeranian Voivodeship (north-west Poland)
