= Międzyborze, West Pomeranian Voivodeship =

Międzyborze
- Village
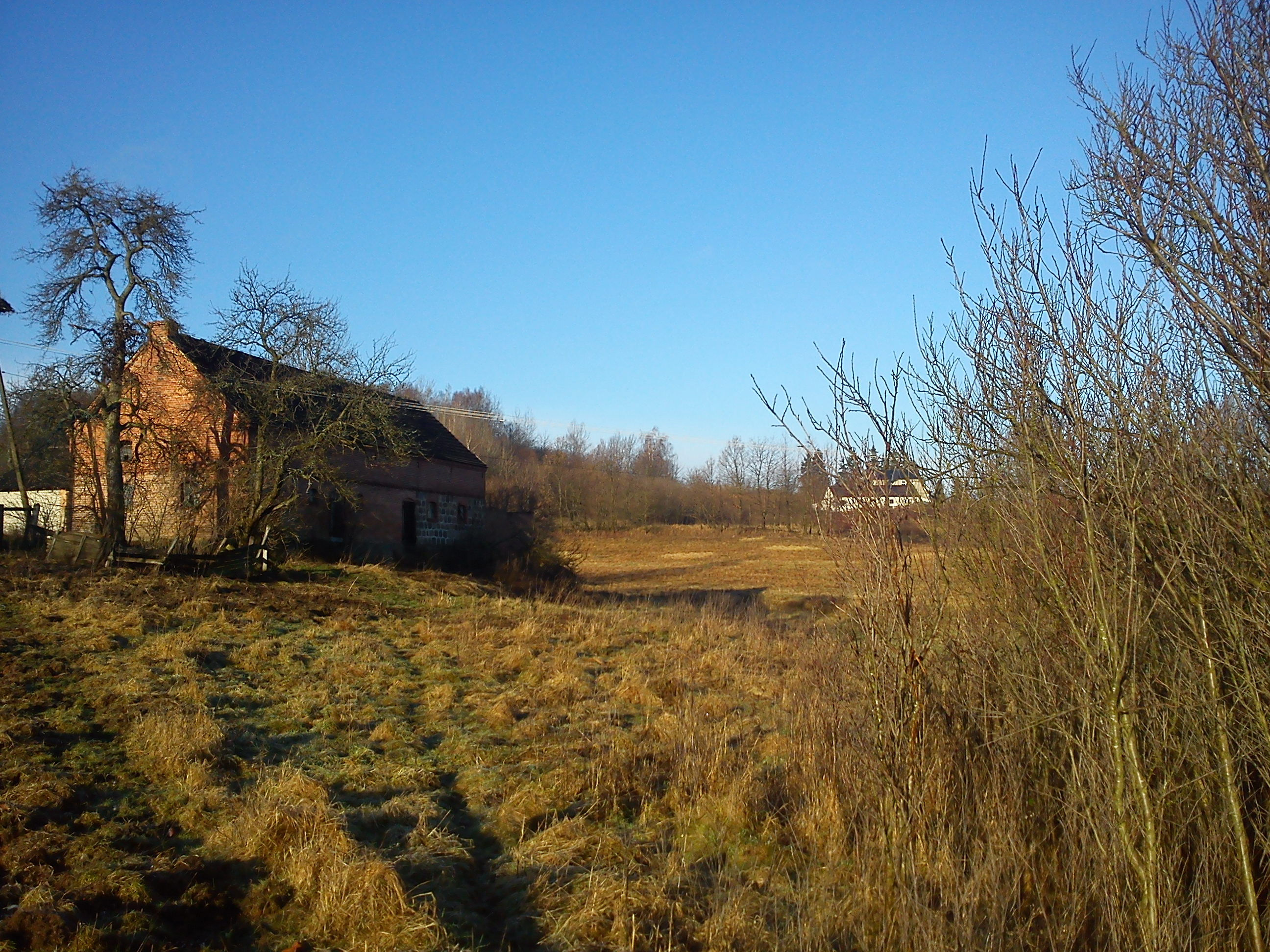
- Abandoned farm in Międzyborze

- Location within Poland
- Coordinates: 53°44′37.82″N 16°5′2.96″E
- Country: Poland
- Voivodeship: West Pomeranian
- County: Świdwin
- Gmina: Połczyn-Zdrój
- Time zone: UTC+01:00 (CET)
  - Summer (DST): UTC+02:00 (CEST)

Międzyborze [mjɛnd͡zɨˈbɔʐɛ] (German: Luisenbad) is a village in the administrative district of Gmina Połczyn-Zdrój, within Świdwin County, West Pomeranian Voivodeship, in north-western Poland.

For the history of the region, see History of Pomerania.
