= Prosno, West Pomeranian Voivodeship =

Prosno
- Settlement
- Location within Poland
- Coordinates: 53°42′04″N 15°59′41″E
- Country: Poland
- Voivodeship: West Pomeranian
- County: Świdwin
- Gmina: Połczyn-Zdrój

Prosno [ˈprɔsnɔ] is a settlement in the administrative district of Gmina Połczyn-Zdrój, within Świdwin County, West Pomeranian Voivodeship, in north-western Poland.
