= Brzozowica, West Pomeranian Voivodeship =

Brzozowica
- Settlement
- Location within Poland
- Coordinates: 53°43′44″N 15°59′44″E
- Country: Poland
- Voivodeship: West Pomeranian
- County: Świdwin
- Gmina: Połczyn-Zdrój

Brzozowica [bʐɔzɔˈvit͡sa] (German: Vorwerk Birkenberg, Birkenberg) is a settlement in the administrative district of Gmina Połczyn-Zdrój, within Świdwin County, West Pomeranian Voivodeship, in north-western Poland.
