= Karwie, West Pomeranian Voivodeship =

Karwie
- Settlement
- Location within Poland
- Coordinates: 53°43′37″N 15°57′28″E
- Country: Poland
- Voivodeship: West Pomeranian
- County: Świdwin
- Gmina: Połczyn-Zdrój

Karwie [ˈkarvjɛ] is a settlement in the administrative district of Gmina Połczyn-Zdrój, within Świdwin County, West Pomeranian Voivodeship, in north-western Poland.

For the history of the region, see History of Pomerania.
