= Nowe Borne =

- Settlement
- Location within Poland
- Coordinates: 53°43′54″N 16°03′26″E
- Country: Poland
- Voivodeship: West Pomeranian
- County: Świdwin
- Gmina: Połczyn-Zdrój

Nowe Borne [ˈnɔvɛ ˈbɔrnɛ] (German: Kolonie Alt Hütten) is a settlement in the administrative district of Gmina Połczyn-Zdrój, within Świdwin County, West Pomeranian Voivodeship, in north-western Poland.

== See also ==
- History of Pomerania, for the history of the region
