= Bronówko =

- Settlement
- Location within Poland
- Coordinates: 53°43′08″N 15°57′58″E
- Country: Poland
- Voivodeship: West Pomeranian
- County: Świdwin
- Gmina: Połczyn-Zdrój

Bronówko [brɔˈnufkɔ] is a settlement in the administrative district of Gmina Połczyn-Zdrój, within Świdwin County, West Pomeranian Voivodeship, in north-western Poland.
