= Piotr Kosiorowski =

Polish footballer

Personal information
- Full name: Piotr Kosiorowski
- Date of birth: 5 January 1981 (age 45)
- Place of birth: Połczyn Zdrój, Poland
- Height: 1.80 m (5 ft 11 in)
- Position: Midfielder

Youth career
- 1995–1999: Polonia Warsaw

Senior career*
| Years | Team | Apps | (Gls) |
| 1999–2003 | Polonia Warsaw | 13 | (1) |
| 2002 | → Orlen Płock (loan) | 7 | (0) |
| 2003 | Błękitni Stargard Szczeciński | 14 | (1) |
| 2004–2005 | Świt Nowy Dwór Mazowiecki | 32 | (4) |
| 2005–2007 | KSZO Ostrowiec | 54 | (2) |
| 2007–2008 | Polonia Warsaw | 19 | (0) |
| 2008–2012 | Dolcan Ząbki | 91 | (8) |
| 2012–2014 | Sandecja Nowy Sącz | 40 | (0) |
| 2014–2015 | Pogoń Siedlce | 18 | (0) |
| 2015–2017 | Polonia Warsaw | 48 | (3) |
| Total | | 336 | (19) |
- * Club domestic league appearances and goals

Piotr Kosiorowski (born 5 January 1981) is a Polish former professional footballer who played as a midfielder. He was most recently the sporting director of his former club Polonia Warsaw.

== Honours ==
Polonia Warsaw

- III liga Łódź–Masovia: 2015–16
- Polish League Cup: 1999–2000
