= Stanisław Wziątek =

Polish politician (born 1959)

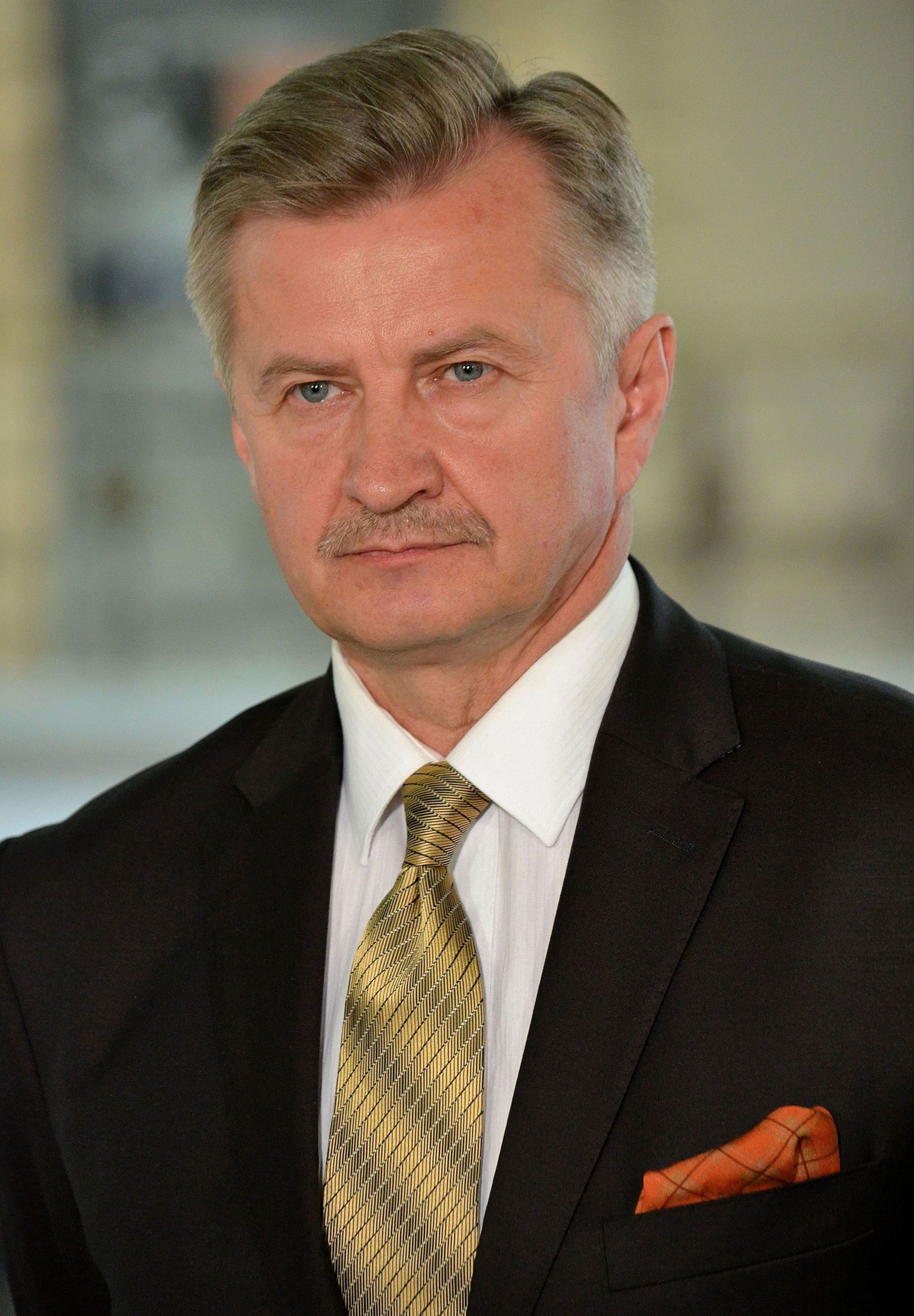

Member of Sejm
- In office 18 October 2005 – 11 November 2015

Personal details
- Born: 13 November 1959 (age 66)
- Party: Democratic Left Alliance

Stanisław Czesław Wziątek (born 13 November 1959 in Połczyn Zdrój) is a Polish politician. He was elected to Sejm on 25 September 2005, getting 8887 votes in 40 Koszalin district as a candidate from Democratic Left Alliance list.

== See also ==
- Members of Polish Sejm 2005-2007
