= Gmina Połczyn-Zdrój =

Gmina Połczyn-Zdrój Połczyn-Zdrój Commune
- Gmina
- Flag Coat of arms
- Interactive map of Gmina Połczyn-Zdrój
- Coordinates (Połczyn-Zdrój): 53°46′N 16°6′E
- Country: Poland
- Voivodeship: West Pomeranian
- County: Świdwin
- Seat: Połczyn-Zdrój

Area
  - Total: 343.71 km^{2} (132.71 sq mi)

Population (2006)
  - Total: 16,016
  - Density: 46.597/km^{2} (120.69/sq mi)
  - Urban: 8,572
  - Rural: 7,444
- Website: http://www.polczyn-zdroj.pl/

Gmina Połczyn-Zdrój is an urban-rural gmina (administrative district) in Świdwin County, West Pomeranian Voivodeship, in north-western Poland. Its seat is the town of Połczyn-Zdrój, which lies approximately 23 kilometres (14 mi) east of Świdwin and 108 km (67 mi) east of the regional capital Szczecin.

The gmina covers an area of 343.71 square kilometres (132.7 sq mi). As of 2006 its total population is 16,016. Out of this, the population of Połczyn-Zdrój amounts to 8,572, and the population of the rural part of the gmina is 7,444.

The gmina contains part of the protected area called Drawsko Landscape Park.

== Villages ==
Apart from the town of Połczyn-Zdrój, Gmina Połczyn-Zdrój contains the villages and settlements of Bolkowo, Borkowo, Borucino, Bronówko, Bronowo, Brusno, Brzękowice, Brzozowica, Buślarki, Buślary, Czarnkowie, Dobino, Dziwogóra, Gaworkowo, Gawroniec, Głażówka, Grabno, Gromnik, Grzybnica, Imienko, Jaźwiny, Jelonki, Kapice, Karsin, Karwie, Kłokówko, Kłokowo, Kocury, Kołacz, Kołaczek, Łąkówko, Łęgi, Łężek, Lipno, Łośnica, Międzyborze, Milice, Niemierzyno, Nowe Borne, Nowe Ludzicko, Nowe Resko, Nowy Toporzyk, Ogartówko, Ogartowo, Ogrodno, Ostre Bardo, Ostrowąs, Pasieka, Plebanówka, Połczyńska, Popielawy, Popielewice, Popielewko, Popielewo, Porąbka, Prosno, Przyrówko, Przyrowo, Redło, Rzęsna, Sękorady, Skarbimierz, Słowianki, Smogorze, Stare Resko, Strosławiec, Sucha, Szeligowo, Toporzyk, Tychówko, Wardyń Dolny, Wardyń Górny, Widów, Zaborze, Zajączkówko, Zajączkowo, Zdroiska, Zdroje and Żołędno.

== Neighbouring gminas ==
Gmina Połczyn-Zdrój is bordered by the gminas of Barwice, Białogard, Czaplinek, Ostrowice, Rąbino, Świdwin, Tychowo and Złocieniec.
