= Rosemarie Zens =

German writer and photographer (born 1944)

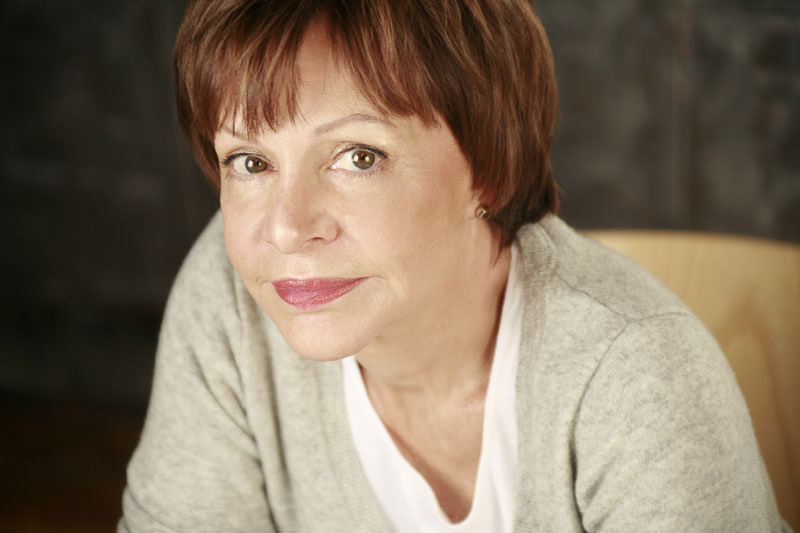
- Zens in 2007
- Born: 1944 (age 81–82) Bad Polzin, Germany (now Poland)

Website
- www.zens.info/phot/en/

Rosemarie Zens (born 1944, Bad Polzin, Germany; present-day Połczyn-Zdrój, Poland) is a German writer and photographer. Zens is a trained psychotherapist. She lives in Berlin.

== Early life and education ==
Zens was born in Bad Polzin in Pomerania in 1944. She received her PhD in German Literature at LMU Munich. Zens also trained as a psychotherapist.

== Career ==
Before beginning her career as a writer and photographer, Zens worked as a teacher and psychotherapist. Since 1995 she has continuously published poems and prose in literary magazines, separate volumes and audio CDs.

== Works ==
- Journeying 66. Vom Mythos des Unterwegsseins. The Myth of the Road (in German and English). Heidelberg, Germany: Kehrer. 2012. ISBN 978-3868282757. - Photography and text.
- Im Schein der Laterna Magica. Hidden Patterns (in German and English). Berlin, Germany: Edition WortOrt. 2011. ISBN 9783000319426. - Selected writings and photographs.
- Vom Gesetz der Währung: Gedichtzyklus. Aachen, Germany: Rimbaud Verlag. 2009. ISBN 9783890865263.
- Eingeschrieben in Kohlenstoff. Aachen, Germany: Rimbaud Verlag. 2007. ISBN 9783890865584. - Selected poems.
- Oberhalb der Solarsegel: Notationen nach der Natur. Gedichtzyklus. Dresden, Germany: Die Scheune. 2004. ISBN 9783937832043.
- Als gingen wir vorüber. Berlin, Germany: APHAIA Verlag. 2003. ISBN 9783926677365. - Poems.
- Lautlos. Regenatem. Berlin: APHAIA Verlag. 2002. ISBN 9783926677334. - Gedichte mit Holzschnitten von Wilfried Bohne und Kompositionen für Stimme und E-Gitarre von Friedemann Graef.

== Recordings ==
- Die Schöne Das Fortgehen Der Ort. (Text and voice: Rosemarie Zens, guitar: Jürgen Heckel) audio book, Edition WortOrt, Berlin 2006
- Siliziumherz. Poesie und Perkussion. (Text: Rosemarie Zens, composition: Ulrich Moritz), Berlin 2003
- Lautlos. Regenaten. Rosemarie Zens, Künstlerporträt, audio book, Berlin 2002
