= Niemierzyno, Gmina Połczyn-Zdrój =

Niemierzyno
- Settlement
- Location within Poland
- Coordinates: 53°48′41″N 16°12′01″E
- Country: Poland
- Voivodeship: West Pomeranian
- County: Świdwin
- Gmina: Połczyn-Zdrój

Niemierzyno [ɲɛmjɛˈʐɨnɔ] (German: Nemrin) is a settlement in the administrative district of Gmina Połczyn-Zdrój, within Świdwin County, West Pomeranian Voivodeship, in north-western Poland.

For the history of the region, see History of Pomerania.
