= Janusz Janowski =

Polish painter and jazz drummer (born 1965)

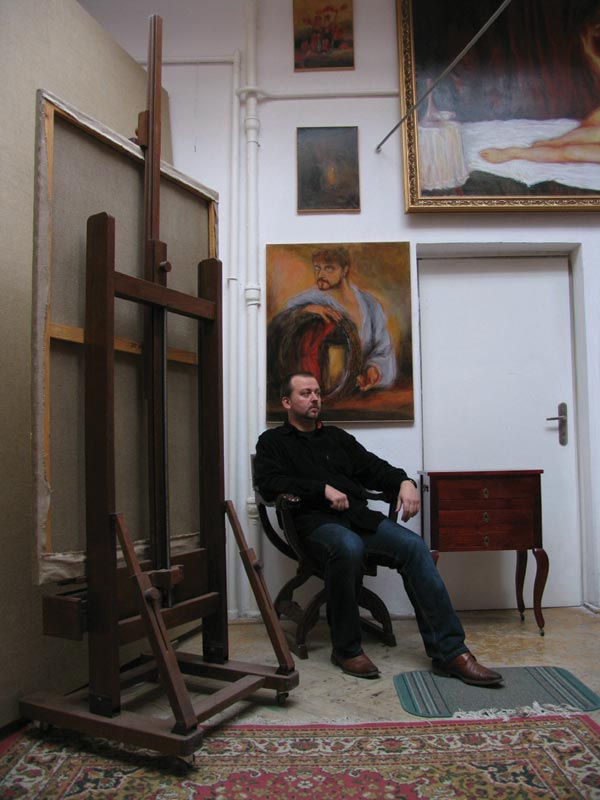
Janusz Janowski

Janusz Janowski (born September 9, 1965 in Połczyn Zdrój, Poland) is a Polish painter, jazz drummer, art theorist, since 2006 president of the Gdańsk Branch of the Association of Polish Painters and Designers (ZPAP), co-creator of the Kazimierz Ostrowski Award (one of the most important awards given to Polish painters). He has been related for most of his artistic life with the city of Gdańsk.

Janowski studied painting at the Academy of Fine Arts in Gdańsk and graduated in 1994. A prominent activist of the cultural life in the region, he initiated a series of annual exhibitions entitled Ocalić od zapomnienia ('To Save from Oblivion'), presenting output of the local painters, and took part in many group and individual expositions of his own artwork. He co-founded an artistic group "Stowarzyszenie Malarzy" ('The Painters' Association'). Janowski was also co-editor of the Polish edition of Donald Kuspit's book The End of Art, which accompanied the art exhibition New Old Masters in National Museum in Gdańsk in 2006.

From the 1980s until the early 2000s Janowski performed as a musician, with a notable participation in the European Projects for Young Artists - Germinations Europe and as a member of a jazz band European Sextett, consisting of Polish, French and German musicians. In the late 1990s and early 2000, he performed in the jazz band Nowy Kwartet ('New Quartet'), playing on the scenes of Tricity.

== Discography ==
- 1998 - „Suita Europejska”, Germany

== Awards ==
- 2004 - Scholarship for the Creators of Culture; Pomeranian Voivodeship Marshal Office
