= Łężek, Świdwin County =

Łężek
- Settlement
- Location within Poland
- Coordinates: 53°46′54.44″N 16°6′38.13″E
- Country: Poland
- Voivodeship: West Pomeranian
- County: Świdwin
- Gmina: Połczyn-Zdrój

Łężek [ˈwɛ̃ʐɛk] is a settlement in the administrative district of Gmina Połczyn-Zdrój, within Świdwin County, West Pomeranian Voivodeship, in north-western Poland.
