= Albrecht von Hagen =

German jurist and resistance fighter

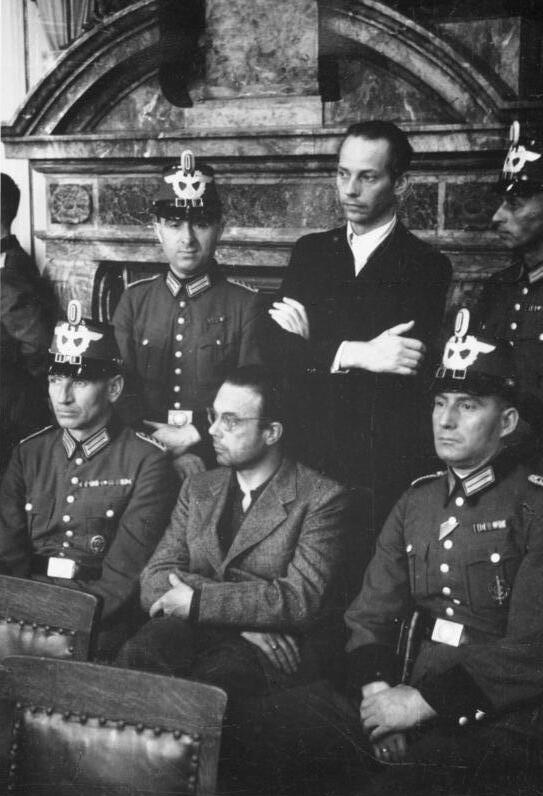
von Hagen at the Volksgerichtshof (sitting in the center)

Albrecht von Hagen (11 March 1904 – 8 August 1944) was a German jurist and a resistance fighter in the time of the Third Reich.

== Life ==
Von Hagen was born in Langen, Pomerania (today Łęgi), on the manor of the original East Brandenburg-Pomeranian noble family in which he was rooted. After studying law in Heidelberg, where he joined the Corps Saxo-Borussia Heidelberg (a Studentenverbindung), and in Königsberg, where he did his articling, he worked for the Osthilfe (a Weimar Republic programme for developing the agrarian economy in eastern Germany) and a private bank. In 1935, he willingly took part in Wehrmacht officer training courses, so that at the outbreak of the Second World War, he entered the military as a lieutenant in the reserves. During an assignment in the Africa campaign, he got to know Claus Graf Schenk von Stauffenberg, under whose influence he joined the resistance movement against the Nazis. The plotters got Von Hagen his post at the Oberkommando der Wehrmacht, where he was responsible for the courier service between military posts in Berlin and the so-called Führerhauptquartier "Wolfsschanze" (the Wolf's Lair, Hitler's secret military headquarters near Rastenburg in East Prussia). In May 1944, Hagen, together with Joachim Kuhn, arranged for the explosive that was to be used in the attempt on Hitler's life. It was delivered through Hellmuth Stieff to Claus von Stauffenberg, who used it in the attack on the Wolf's Lair on 20 July 1944.

Von Hagen was arrested straightaway after the failed attempt to assassinate the Führer. A few days later, his family was also taken into custody. On 8 August 1944, the Volksgerichtshof sentenced him to death in a show trial, and Von Hagen was hanged later the same day at Plötzensee Prison in Berlin. In his farewell letter to his wife is the line:

... mit meinem Schicksal kann ich nicht hadern.
("... with my fate I cannot quarrel.")

Von Hagen was a Knight of Honour of the Order of St John.

== Literature ==
- Dagmar Albrecht, Mit meinem Schicksal kann ich nicht hadern. Sippenhaft in der Familie Albrecht von Hagen; Berlin (Dietz) 2001 (ISBN 3-320-02018-8)

== See also ==
- List of members of the 20 July plot
