= Borkowo, Świdwin County =

Borkowo
- Village
- Location within Poland
- Coordinates: 53°45′32″N 15°56′15″E
- Country: Poland
- Voivodeship: West Pomeranian
- County: Świdwin
- Gmina: Połczyn-Zdrój

Borkowo [bɔrˈkɔvɔ] is a village in the administrative district of Gmina Połczyn-Zdrój, within Świdwin County, West Pomeranian Voivodeship, in north-western Poland.
