= Max Wagenknecht =

German composer (1857–1922)

Max Otto Arnold Wagenknecht
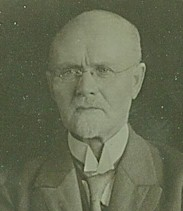
- Born: 14 August 1857; Woldisch Tychow, Pomerania, Kingdom of Prussia
- Died: 7 May 1922 (aged 64)
- Occupation: Composer
- Style: Romantic

Max Otto Arnold Wagenknecht (14 August 1857 – 7 May 1922) was a German composer of organ and piano music.

== Biography ==
He was born in Woldisch Tychow, Pomerania, Kingdom of Prussia and spent most of his life in the Mecklenburg-Western Pomerania region where he was music teacher at the Franzburg Teachers' College and in his later life organist and composer in Anklam. He is most well known for his Opus 5, 58 Vor- und Nachspiele ("58 Preludes and Postludes"), completed in July 1889 in Franzburg. The work demonstrates a remarkable gift for melodic organ compositions, bridging traditional church music and the late 19th-century romantic music era.

== Works ==
Wagenknecht published an unknown number of musical works. The following have been preserved:

- Three Polkas, Op. 1, for piano. This work was most likely composed while he was studying at the conservatory in Berlin
- Rheinländer, Op. 2, for violin or flute with piano accompaniment (Stralsund: J. P. Lindner Sohn)
- Three Songs, Op. 3, with texts by Schanz, Kletke and Reinick, with piano accompaniment (Stralsund: J. P. Lindner Sohn)
- 58 Vor- und Nachspiele, Op. 5, for organ (Stralsund: J. P. Lindner Sohn, 1889)
- Opus 10, 13 and 14: songs with piano accompaniment. It is unknown whether these works have been published since only the handwritten originals remain.
