= Połczyn-Zdrój =

Town in West Pomeranian Voivodeship, Poland

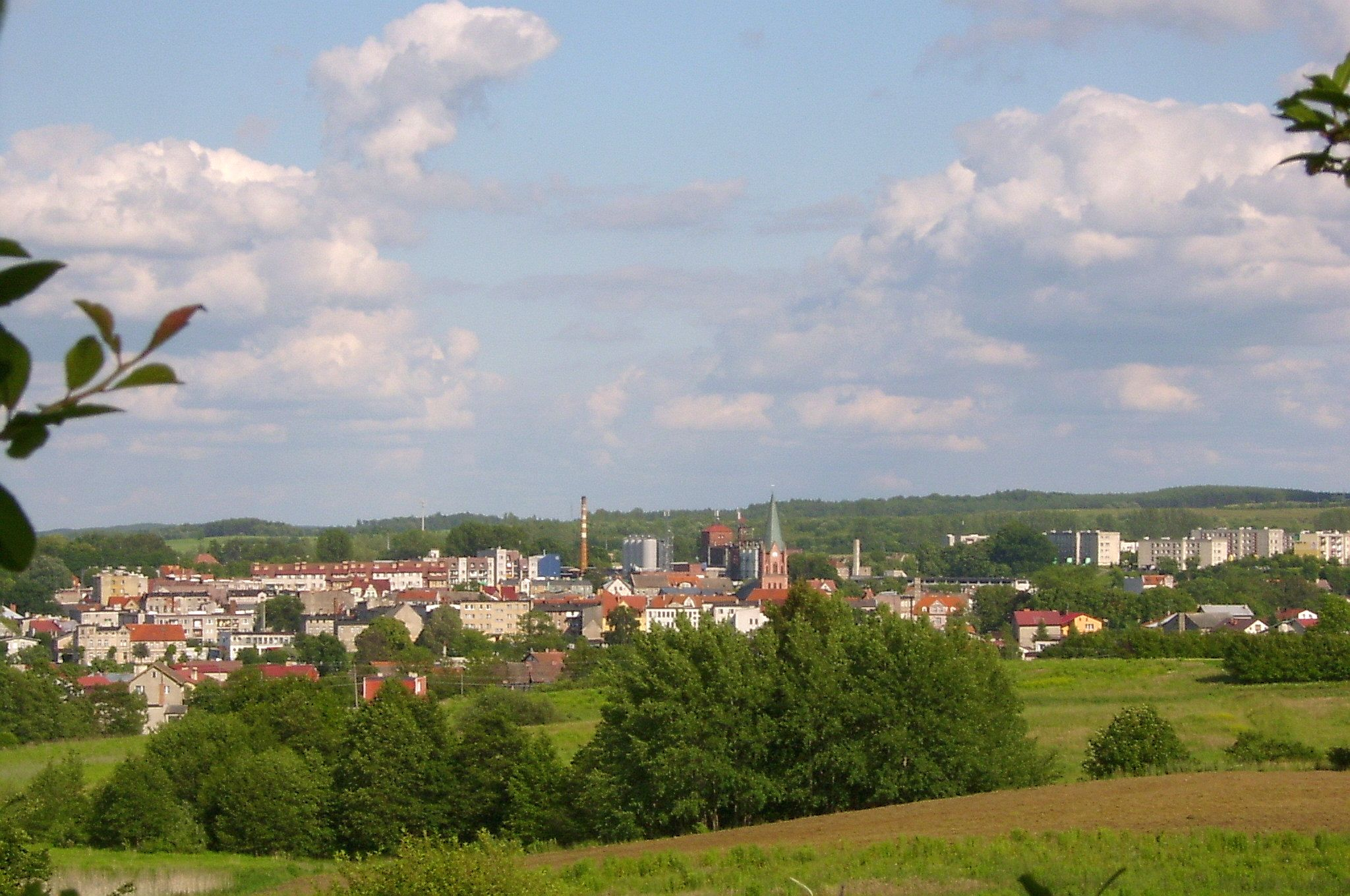
- Panorama of the town

- Flag Coat of arms

- Location within Poland
- Coordinates: 53°46′N 16°6′E
- Country: Poland
- Voivodeship: West Pomeranian
- County: Świdwin
- Gmina: Połczyn-Zdrój

Area
  - Total: 7.21 km^{2} (2.78 sq mi)

Population (2010)
  - Total: 8,372
  - Density: 1,160/km^{2} (3,010/sq mi)
- Time zone: UTC+1 (CET)
  - Summer (DST): UTC+2 (CEST)
- Postal code: 78-320
- Area Code: (+48) 94
- Car plates: ZSD
- Website: www.polczyn-zdroj.pl

Połczyn-Zdrój [ˈpɔu̯t͡ʂɨn ˈzdrui̯] (Kashubian: Pôłczëno; German: Bad Polzin) is a spa town in Świdwin County, West Pomeranian Voivodeship, in north-western Poland, with 8,372 inhabitants (2010). It is situated on the Wogra River in the historic region of Pomerania.

== History ==
Połczyn-Zdrój dates back to an early medieval Pomeranian settlement. The territory became part of the emerging Polish state under Mieszko I around 967. Following the fragmentation of Poland, it formed part of the Duchy of Pomerania. Połczyn was a defensive stronghold located in the Białogard castellany. The town and its castle are mentioned in historical records from 1321 and 1331, respectively, which state that they belonged to a fief that the powerful noble Wedel family had obtained from the Pomeranian dukes. In the 15th century other families were in possession of the town.

In 1825, a brewery was founded. The town had three mineral springs of enhanced iron content and with a temperature between 9 and 11 °C (48 and 52 °F), which were exploited in sanatoriums in order to cure rheumatism. Before World War I, the town was known as Polzin. It acquired the name Bad Polzin (i. e., "Bath Polzin", or "Polzin Spa") between the two World Wars. Just before World War II, in 1939, the local brewery reached its highest production level in its pre-war history, with 65,000 hl.

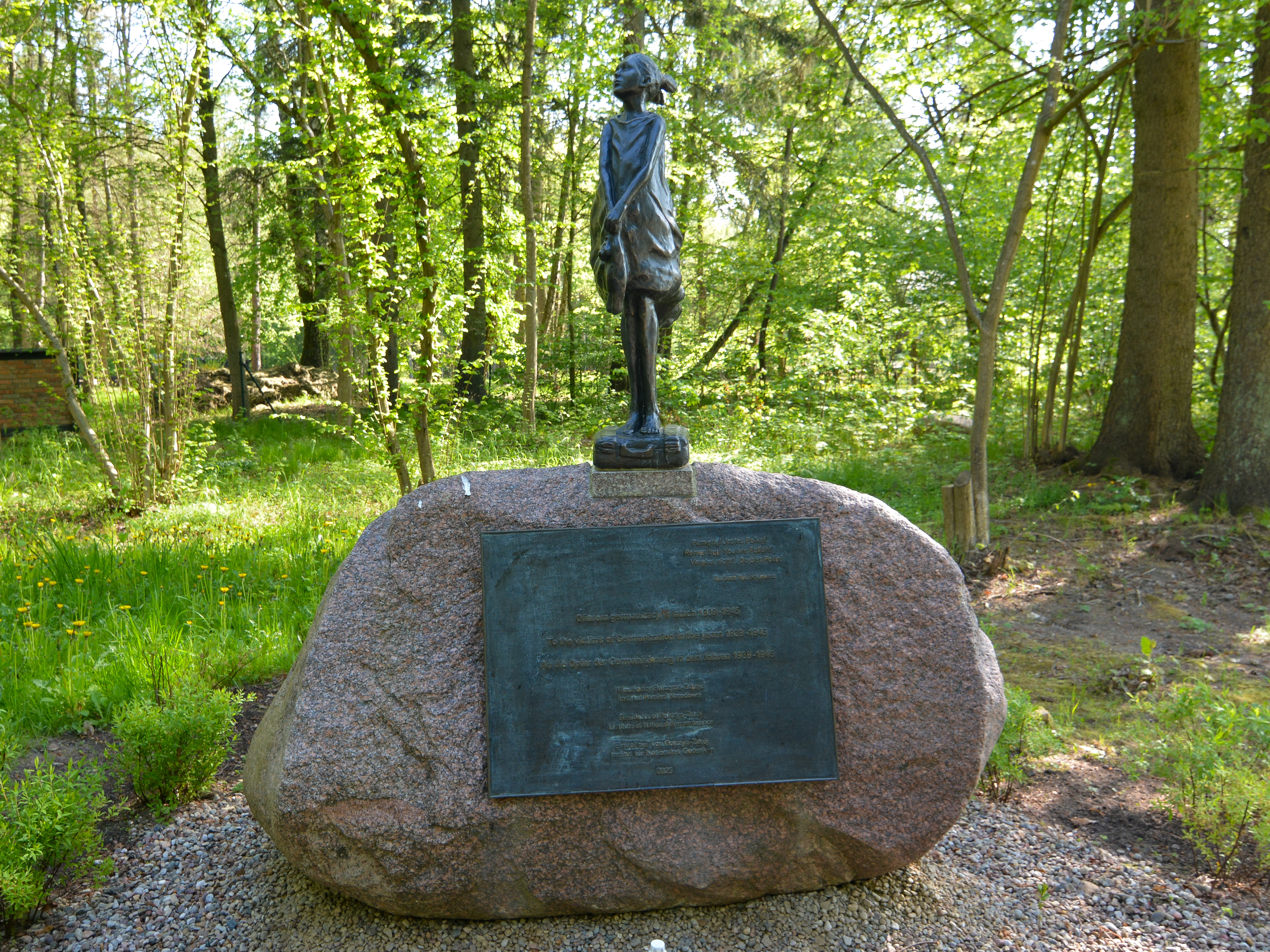
Memorial to victims of Germanisation in World War II

During World War II, the Germans established a camp for kidnapped Polish children intended for Germanisation. On 5 March 1945, the town was captured by the Poles and after the end of the war it became again part of Poland, although with a Soviet-installed communist regime.

In the summer of 1945, the communist authorities announced that the population has to leave their home after harvest. However, after the Potsdam Conference evictions were officially postponed to spring 1946. In-officially, the administration was mandated to continue expulsions. According to German witness reports, starting end of October 1945, each night 100-150 Germans to be expelled were forced out of their homes, plundered and sometimes raped.

The town's first post-war mayor was Benedykt Polak, former prisoner of the Oflag II-C German prisoner-of-war camp. The local brewery was seized by the Soviets, who agreed to hand it over to Poland; however, they continued to occupy it for several months until February 1946, despite the appointment of Aleksander Stromenger as the Polish director of the brewery in November 1945. Stromenger, a member of the Home Army resistance movement and participant of the Warsaw Uprising, rewarded with the Cross of Valour and Virtuti Militari, was dismissed in November 1948 and subsequently arrested by the communists on charges of subversive activity in 1950.

In July 1996, after heavy rainfall, the town suffered a flood, after which a new retention reservoir was built between 2000 and 2003.

== Demographics ==
Historical population

Year	Pop.	±%
1880	4,724	—
1890	4,632	−1.9%
1900	4,956	+7.0%
1910	5,160	+4.1%
1925	5,959	+15.5%

Year	Pop.	±%
1939	6,920	+16.1%
1950	4,949	−28.5%
1960	7,593	+53.4%
2010	8,372	+10.3%

== Gallery ==
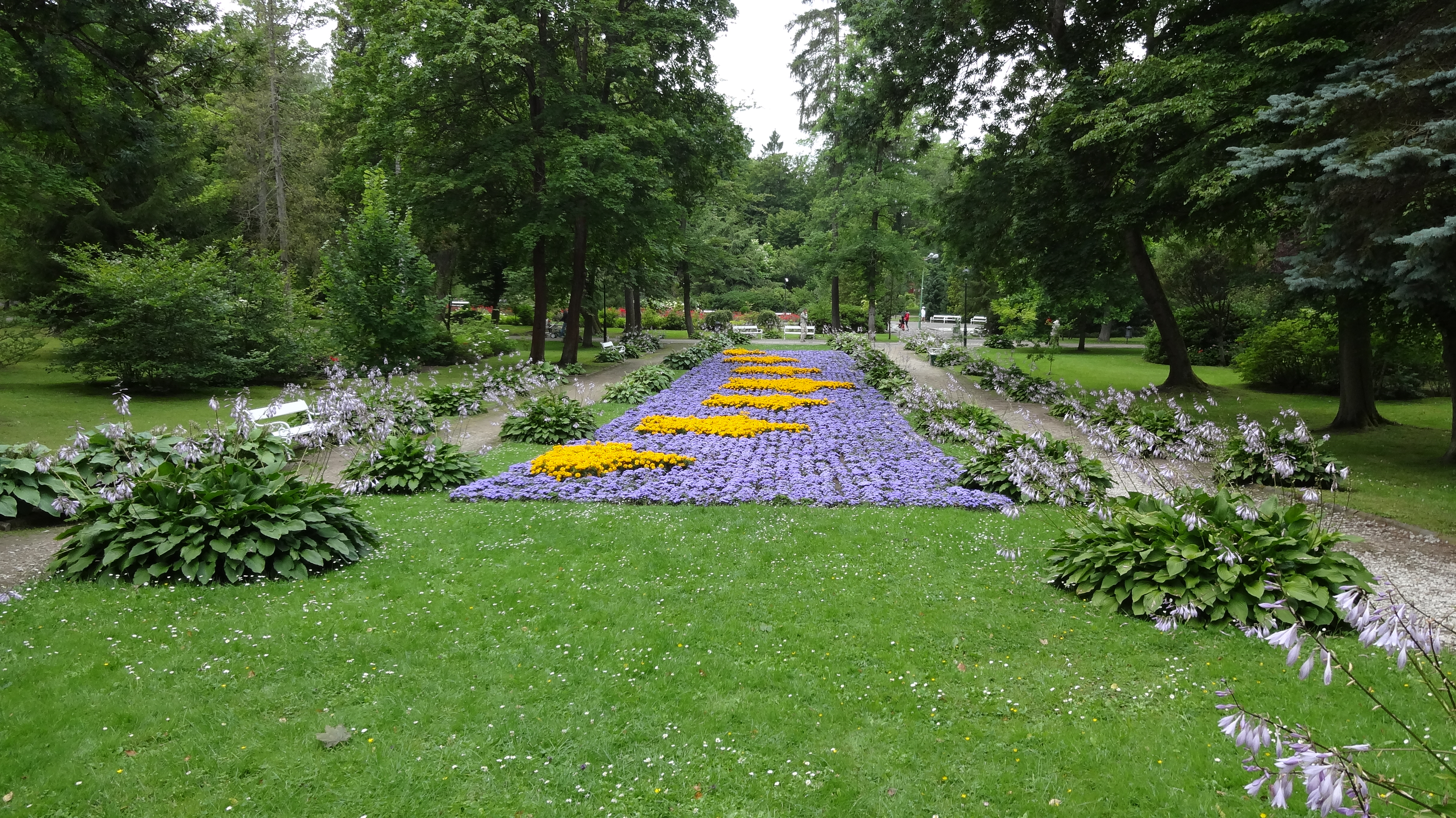
Park Zdrojowy (Spa Park)

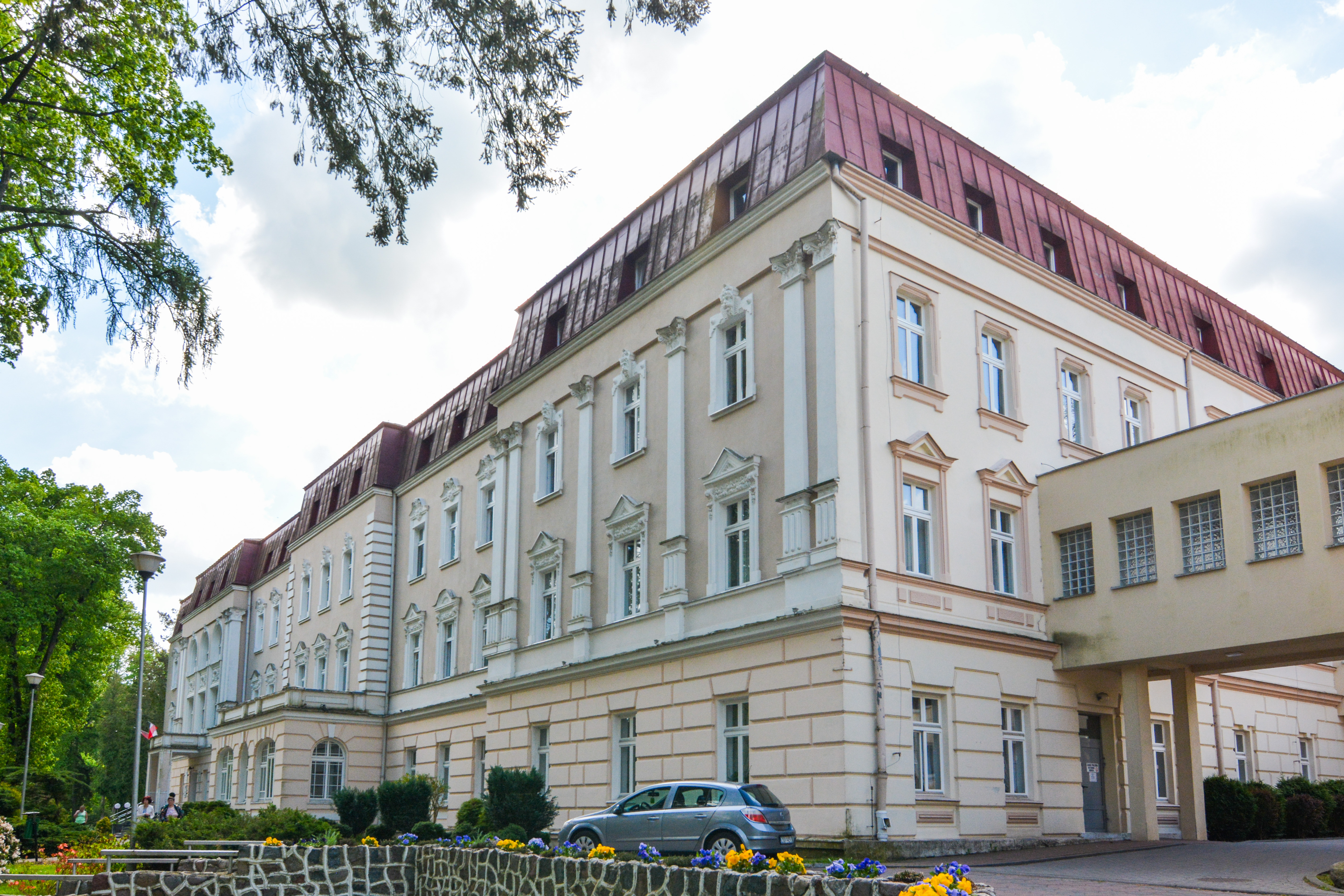
Sanatorium Gryf

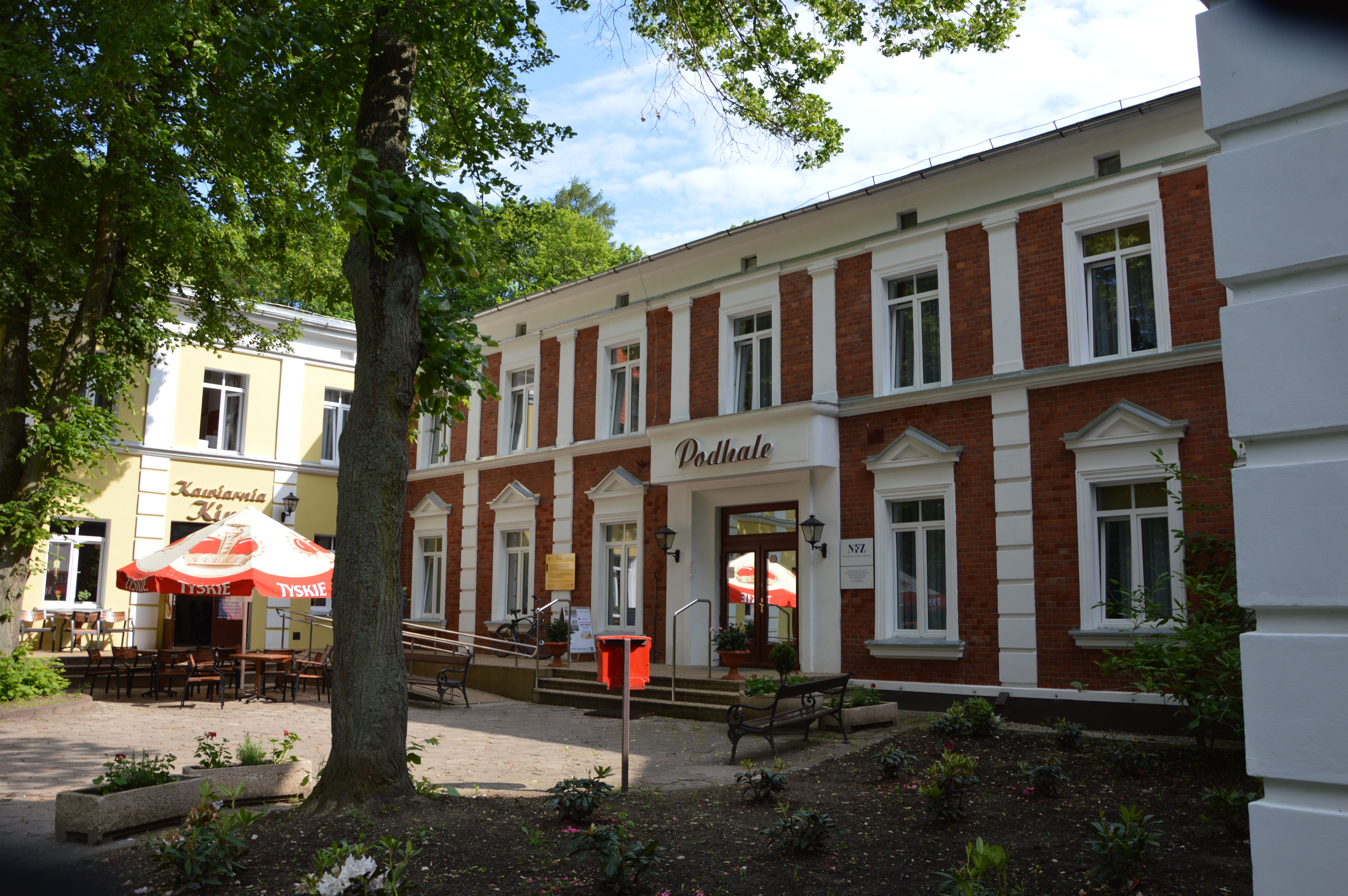
Sanatorium Podhale

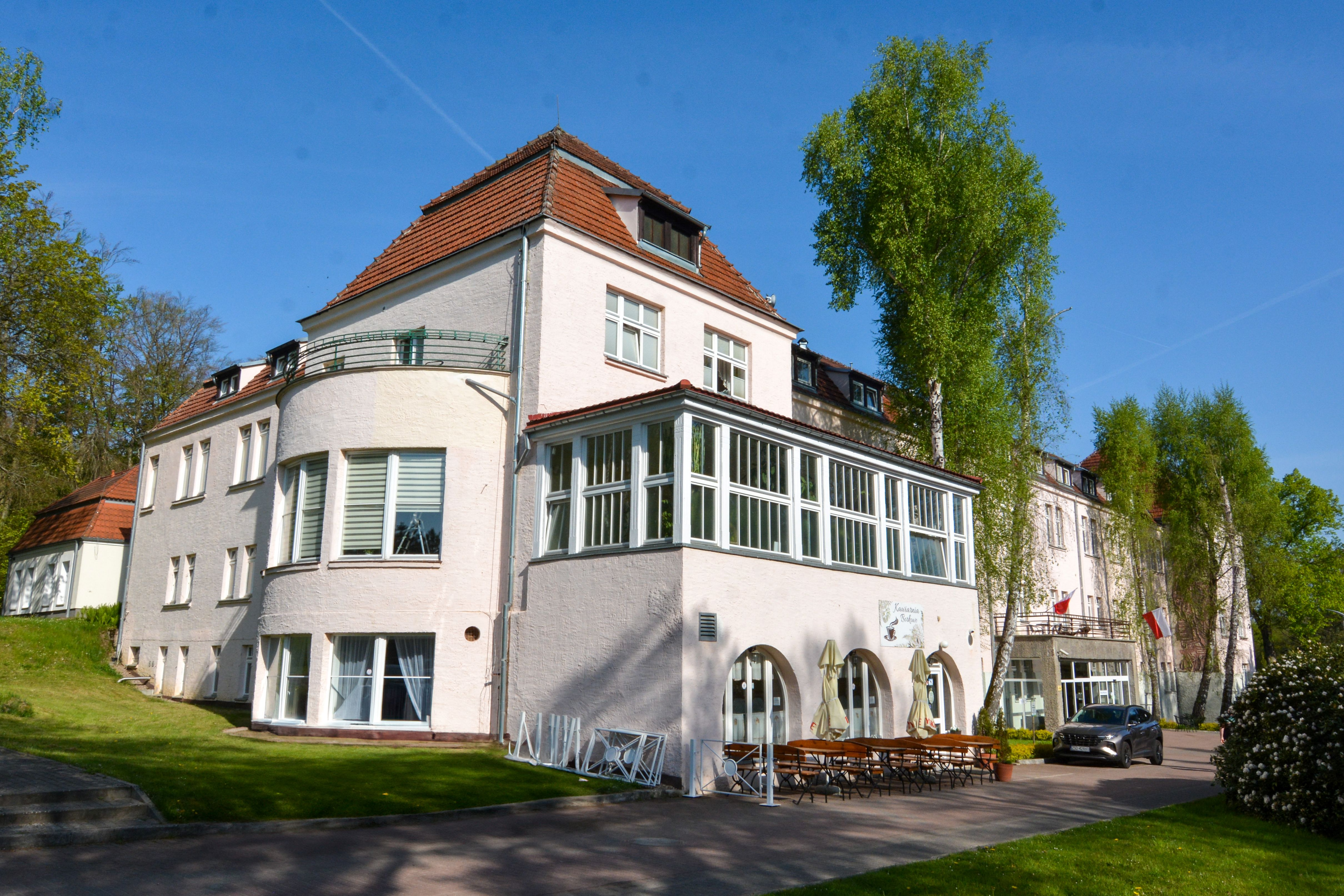
Sanatorium Borkowo, Germanisation camp for kidnapped Polish children during World War II

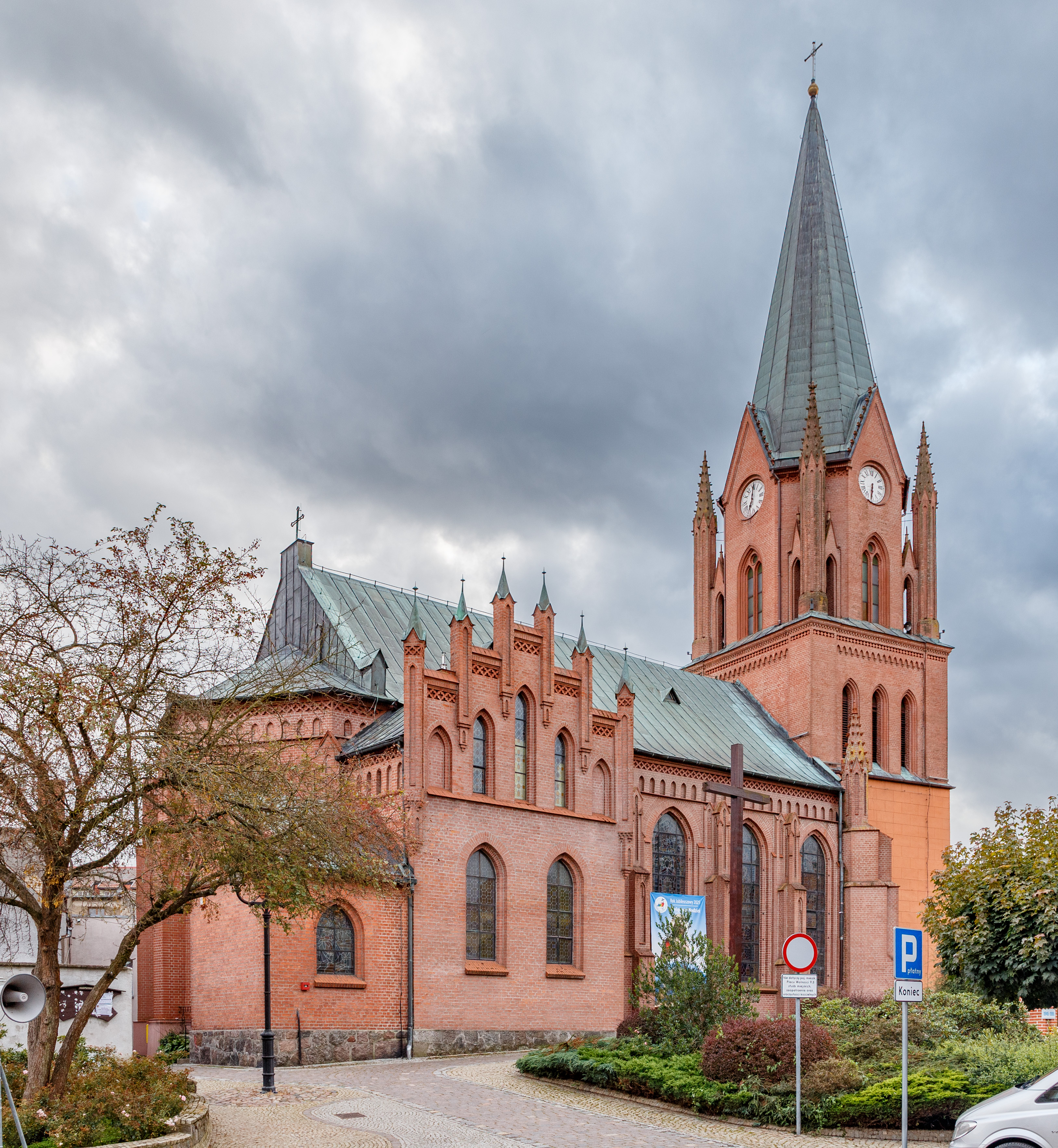
Our Lady of Perpetual Help church

== Notable residents ==
- Anton von Krockow (1714–1778) a Prussian lieutenant general.
- Karl Schröder (1884–1950) a German communist politician and writer
- Friedl Behn-Grund (1906–1989) a German cinematographer
- Volker Vogeler (1930–2005) a German film director and screenwriter
- Bernd Heinrich (born 1940) a biologist and long distance runner
- Susan Denberg (born 1944) a German-Austrian model and actress
- Rosemarie Zens (born 1944) a German writer and photographer
- Robert Atzorn (born 1945) a German television actor
- Stanisław Wziątek (born 1959) a Polish politician, elected to Sejm in 2005
- Janusz Janowski (born 1965) a Polish painter, jazz drummer and art theorist
- Olgierd Moskalewicz (born 1974) a Polish footballer, over 420 pro appearances
- Sławomir Nitras (born 1973) a Polish politician and political scientist, elected to the Sejm in 2015.
- Piotr Kosiorowski (born 1981), Polish footballer, over 200 pro appearances
- Szymon Pawłowski (born 1986), Polish footballer, over 275 pro appearances and 17 for Poland
- Joanna Zachoszcz (born 1993) a Polish swimmer, competed in the women's 10 km at the 2016 Summer Olympics
- Leo Levy (1881–1938) a German merchant from the Jewish Levy family, a doctor of chemistry, and a soldier in Wilhelm II's Imperial Army during World War I.
