= Świdwin County =

Świdwin County Powiat świdwiński
- County
- Flag Coat of arms

- Location within the voivodeship

- Division into gminas
- Coordinates (Świdwin): 53°47′N 15°46′E
- Country: Poland
- Voivodeship: West Pomeranian
- Seat: Świdwin
- Gminas: Total 6 (incl. 1 urban): Świdwin; Gmina Brzeżno; Gmina Połczyn-Zdrój; Gmina Rąbino; Gmina Sławoborze; Gmina Świdwin

Area
  - Total: 1,093.1 km^{2} (422.0 sq mi)

Population (2006)
  - Total: 48,920
  - Density: 44.75/km^{2} (115.9/sq mi)
  - Urban: 24,209
  - Rural: 24,711
- Car plates: ZSD
- Website: www.powiatswidwinski.pl

Świdwin County (Polish: powiat świdwiński) is a unit of territorial administration and local government (powiat) in West Pomeranian Voivodeship, north-western Poland. It came into being on January 1, 1999, as a result of the Polish local government reforms passed in 1998. Its administrative seat and largest town is Świdwin, which lies 89 kilometres (55 mi) north-east of the regional capital Szczecin. The only other town in the county is Połczyn-Zdrój, lying 23 km (14 mi) east of Świdwin.

The county covers an area of 1,093.06 square kilometres (422.0 sq mi). As of 2012 its total population is 49,181.

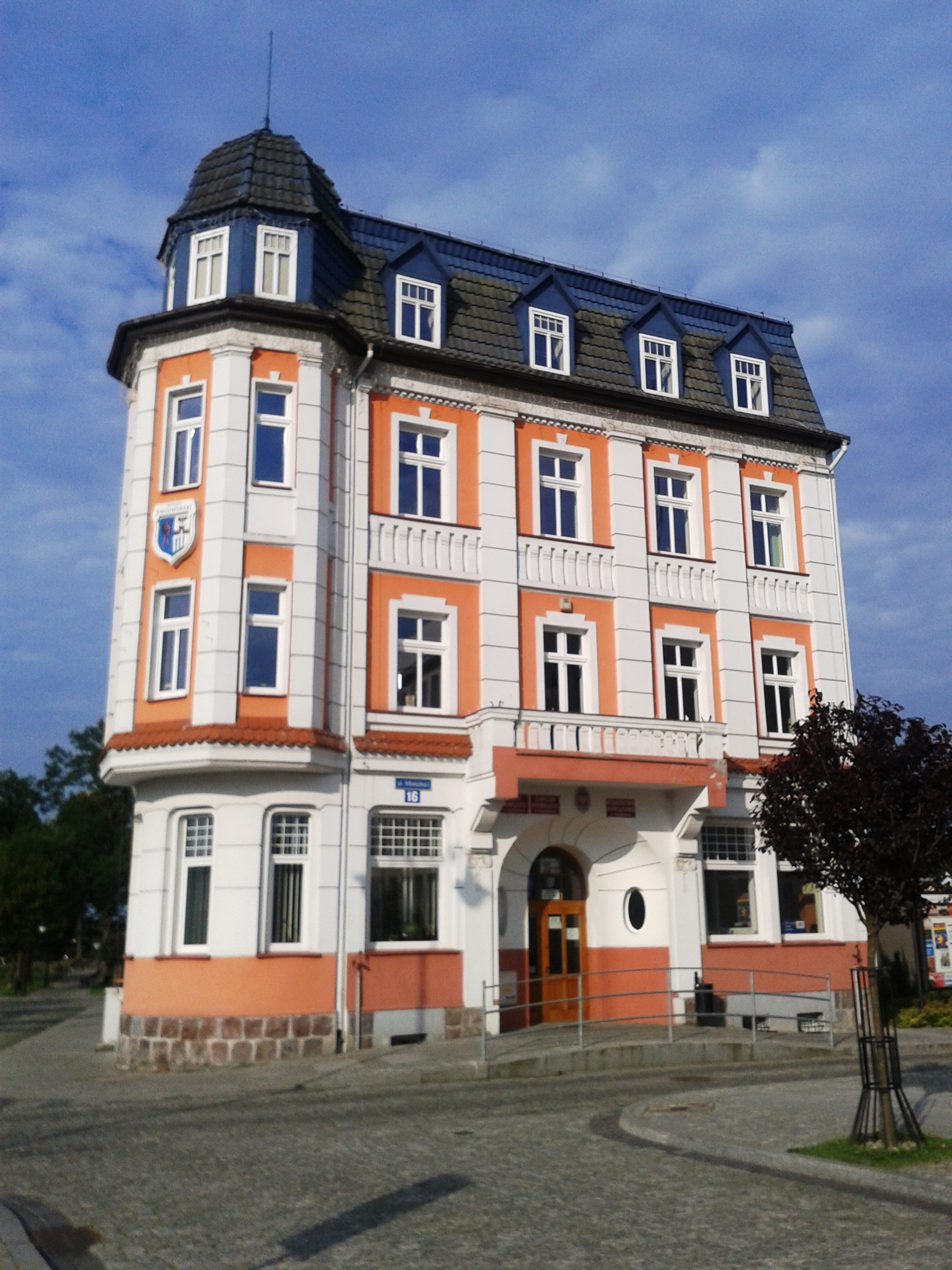
Świdwin - district office

== Neighbouring counties ==
Świdwin County is bordered by Kołobrzeg County and Białogard County to the north, Szczecinek County to the east, and Drawsko County and Łobez County to the south.

== Administrative divisions ==
The county is subdivided into six gminas (one urban, one urban-rural and four rural). These are listed in the following table, in descending order of population.

| Gmina | Type | Area (km^{2}) | Population (2006) | Seat |
|---|---|---|---|---|
| Gmina Połczyn-Zdrój | urban-rural | 343.7 | 16,016 | Połczyn-Zdrój |
| Świdwin | urban | 22.5 | 15,637 | |
| Gmina Świdwin | rural | 247.3 | 6,202 | Świdwin * |
| Gmina Sławoborze | rural | 188.7 | 4,274 | Sławoborze |
| Gmina Rąbino | rural | 180.0 | 3,935 | Rąbino |
| Gmina Brzeżno | rural | 110.8 | 2,856 | Brzeżno |
* seat not part of the gmina
