= Łagowski =

Łagowski or Lagowski is a Polish surname or an adjective meaning from Łagow. It may refer to:

== People ==
- J J Lagowski (?–2014), American chemist
- Bronisław Łagowski (born 1937), Polish political scientist

== Places ==
- Łagów Landscape Park in Poland
