= Stok (disambiguation) =

Stok is a village and museum in northern India.

Stok may also refer to:

== Places ==
- Stok, Kuyavian-Pomeranian Voivodeship (central Poland)
- Stok, Podlaskie Voivodeship (north-east Poland)
- Stok, Łódź Voivodeship (central Poland)
- Stok, Puławy County in Lublin Voivodeship (east Poland)
- Stok, Radzyń County in Lublin Voivodeship (east Poland)
- Stok, Masovian Voivodeship (east-central Poland)
- Stok, Lubusz Voivodeship (west Poland)

== People with the surname ==
- Barbara Stok (born 1970), Dutch cartoonist

== See also ==
- Stock (disambiguation)
