= Łagów =

Łagów is the name of several villages in Poland:

- Łagów, Lower Silesian Voivodeship (in Zgorzelec County; south-west Poland)
- Łagów, Łódź Voivodeship (in Łowicz County; central Poland)
- Łagów, Świętokrzyskie Voivodeship (in Kielce County; south-central Poland)
- Łagów, Masovian Voivodeship (in Zwoleń County; east-central Poland)
- Łagów, Krosno County in Lubusz Voivodeship (west Poland)
- Łagów, Świebodzin County in Lubusz Voivodeship (west Poland)

== See also ==
- Gmina Łagów (disambiguation)
- Łagów Landscape Park
