= Zagor =

Zagor may refer to:

== People ==
- Bernadett Zágor (born 1990), Hungarian football player
- Józef Zagor (born 1940), Polish equestrian

== Places ==
- Zagor (Trnovo), Bosnia and Herzegovina
- Zagor or Sagar, Germany
- Nowy Zagór, Poland
- Stary Zagór, Poland
- Zagăr (Hungarian: Zágor), Romania

== Other ==
- Zagor (comics)
- Zagor (folk drama)
- Zagor (film), a 1970 Turkish film
- Zagor (music)
- In the Fighting Fantasy franchise
  - Legend of Zagor, a role-playing gamebook
  - A character in the adventure gamebook The Warlock of Firetop Mountain

== See also ==
- Zagora (disambiguation)
- Zagori (disambiguation)
