= Selchow =

Selchow may refer to:

- Selchow and Righter, US-American game manufacturer
- Selchow (Schönefeld), place in the municipality of Schönefeld (near Berlin), Brandenburg
- Selchow, district of Storkow, Brandenburg
- Żelechów, Lubusz Voivodeship a district in the Lebus voivodeship
- Żelechowo (formerly Selchow in the district of Greifenhagen, Pomerania), a district in the West Pomeranian Voivodeship
- Żelichowo, Greater Poland Voivodeship (formerly Selchow originally in the district of Czarnikau, from 1 October 1887 to 15 December 1919 in the district of Filehne, then in the Netzekreis, Pomerania), a district in the Wielkopolska voivodeship
