= Zamet =

Zamet can refer to:

- Zamet, Rijeka, a neighborhood in the city of Rijeka, Croatia
- Zamęt, a village in the administrative district of Gmina Łagów, within Świebodzin County, Lubusz Voivodeship, in western Poland
- Centar Zamet, a sports venue in Rijeka, Croatia
