= Mniszków =

Mniszków may refer to the following places in Poland:

- Mniszków, Lower Silesian Voivodeship (south-west Poland)
- Mniszków, Łódź Voivodeship (central Poland)
