= Owczary =

Owczary may refer to the following places in Poland:

- Owczary, Lubin County in Lower Silesian Voivodeship (south-west Poland)
- Owczary, Oława County in Lower Silesian Voivodeship (south-west Poland)
- Owczary, Łódź Voivodeship (central Poland)
- Owczary, Gorlice County in Lesser Poland Voivodeship (south Poland)
- Owczary, Kraków County in Lesser Poland Voivodeship (south Poland)
- Owczary, Świętokrzyskie Voivodeship (south-central Poland)
- Owczary, Lubusz Voivodeship (west Poland)
- Owczary, Bytów County in Pomeranian Voivodeship (north Poland)
- Owczary, Słupsk County in Pomeranian Voivodeship (north Poland)
- Owczary, West Pomeranian Voivodeship (north-west Poland)
