= Zajączków =

Zajączków may refer to the following places in Poland:

- Zajączków, Lower Silesian Voivodeship (south-west Poland)
- Zajączków, Łódź Voivodeship (central Poland)
- Zajączków, Lublin Voivodeship (east Poland)
- Zajączków, Świętokrzyskie Voivodeship (south-central Poland)
- Zajączków, Masovian Voivodeship (east-central Poland)
