= Gronów =

Gronów may refer to the following places in Poland:

- Gronów, Lower Silesian Voivodeship (south-west Poland)
- Gronów, Łódź Voivodeship (central Poland)
- Gronów, Krosno County in Lubusz Voivodeship (west Poland)
- Gronów, Słubice County in Lubusz Voivodeship (west Poland)
- Gronów, Świebodzin County in Lubusz Voivodeship (west Poland)

Gronow may also refer to the following people:

- Ben Gronow (1887-1967), Wales dual-code international rugby player
- Berengar Elsner von Gronow (born 1978), German politician
- Laurens Theodor Gronow (1730-1777), Dutch naturalist
- Rees Howell Gronow (1794–1865), dandy and writer of reminiscences
