= Swieciechow =

Swieciechow may refer to the following places in Poland:

- Świeciechów, Łódź Voivodeship
- Święciechów, West Pomeranian Voivodeship
