= Gmina Dąbie =

Gmina Dąbie may refer to either of the following gminas (municipalities) in Poland:

- Gmina Dąbie, Greater Poland Voivodeship, an urban‑rural municipality located in Koło County, Greater Poland Voivodeship
- Gmina Dąbie, Lubusz Voivodeship, a rural municipality in Krosno County, Lubusz Voivodeship
