= Gronowo =

Gronowo may refer to the following places:

- Gronowo, Kuyavian-Pomeranian Voivodeship (north-central Poland)
- Gronowo, Braniewo County in Warmian-Masurian Voivodeship (north Poland)
- Gronowo, Działdowo County in Warmian-Masurian Voivodeship (north Poland)
- Gronowo, Lidzbark County in Warmian-Masurian Voivodeship (north Poland)
- Gronowo, Mrągowo County in Warmian-Masurian Voivodeship (north Poland)
- Gronowo, West Pomeranian Voivodeship (north-west Poland)

== See also ==
- Gronów (disambiguation)
