= Łagówek =

- Village
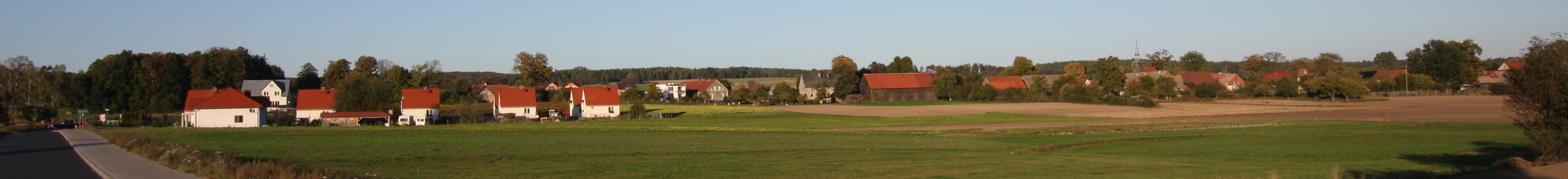

- Location within Poland
- Coordinates: 52°20′57″N 15°18′55″E
- Country: Poland
- Voivodeship: Lubusz
- County: Świebodzin
- Gmina: Łagów

Łagówek [waˈɡuvɛk] is a village in the administrative district of Gmina Łagów, within Świebodzin County, Lubusz Voivodeship, in western Poland.
