= Radonia, Łódź Voivodeship =

Radonia
- Village
- Location within Poland
- Coordinates: 51°21′N 19°59′E
- Country: Poland
- Voivodeship: Łódź
- County: Opoczno
- Gmina: Mniszków
- Population: 140

Radonia [raˈdɔɲa] is a village in the administrative district of Gmina Mniszków, within Opoczno County, Łódź Voivodeship, in central Poland.
