= Syski, Opoczno County =

Syski
- Village
- Location within Poland
- Coordinates: 51°24′N 20°4′E
- Country: Poland
- Voivodeship: Łódź
- County: Opoczno
- Gmina: Mniszków

Syski [ˈsɨski] is a village in the administrative district of Gmina Mniszków, within Opoczno County, Łódź Voivodeship, in central Poland.
