= Zarzęcin =

- Village
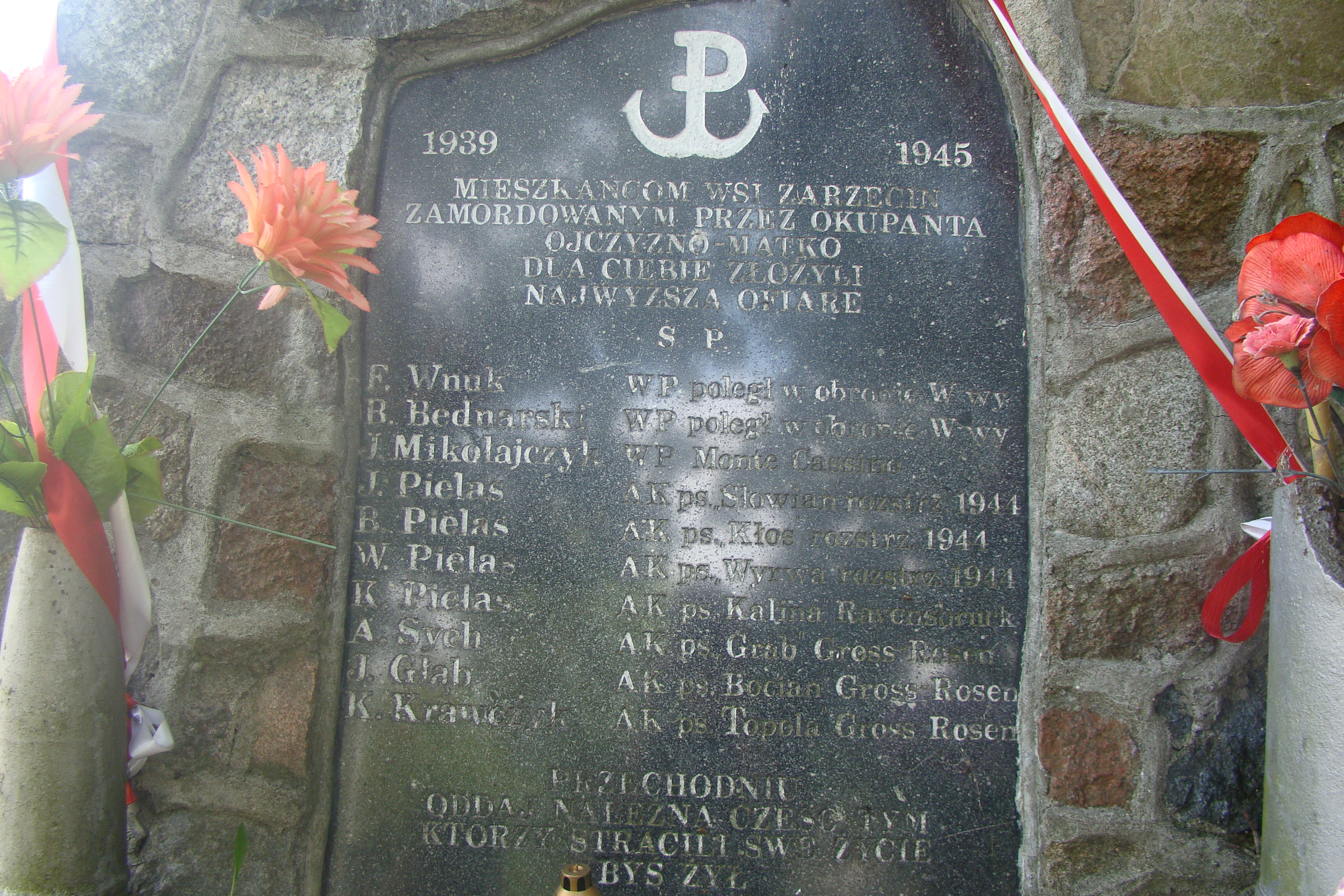

- Location within Poland
- Coordinates: 51°25′N 19°56′E
- Country: Poland
- Voivodeship: Łódź
- County: Opoczno
- Gmina: Mniszków

Zarzęcin [zaˈʐɛnt͡ɕin] is a village in the administrative district of Gmina Mniszków, within Opoczno County, Łódź Voivodeship, in central Poland.
