= Błogie Szlacheckie =

- Village
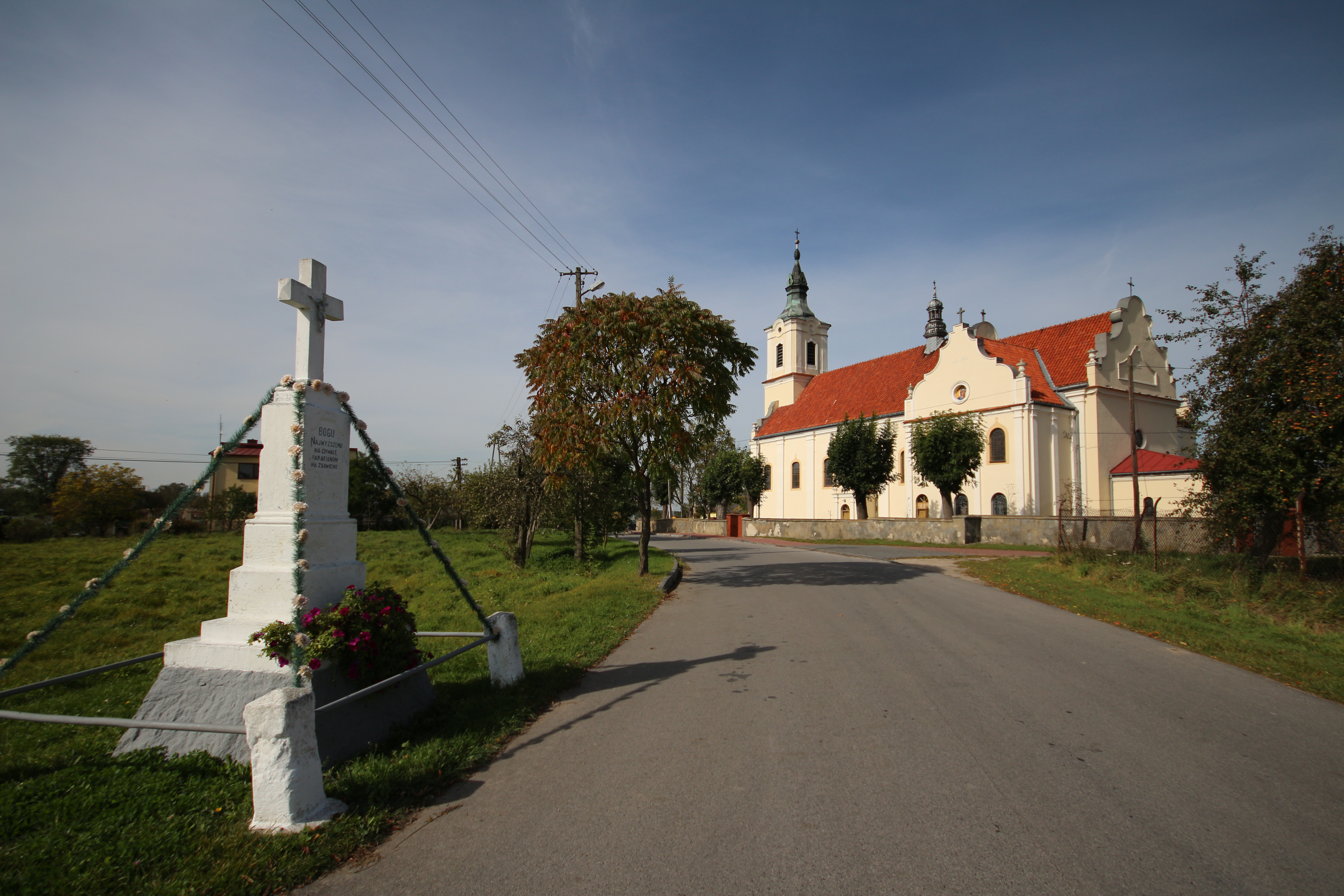

- Location within Poland
- Coordinates: 51°23′N 19°58′E
- Country: Poland
- Voivodeship: Łódź
- County: Opoczno
- Gmina: Mniszków

Błogie Szlacheckie [ˈbwɔɡʲɛ ʂlaˈxɛt͡skʲɛ] is a village in the administrative district of Gmina Mniszków, within Opoczno County, Łódź Voivodeship, in central Poland.
