= Kolonia Czartów =

- Settlement
- Location within Poland
- Coordinates: 52°17′40″N 15°13′41″E
- Country: Poland
- Voivodeship: Lubusz
- County: Świebodzin
- Gmina: Łagów

Kolonia Czartów [kɔˈlɔɲa ˈt͡ʂartuf] is a settlement in the administrative district of Gmina Łagów, within Świebodzin County, Lubusz Voivodeship, in western Poland.

The settlement is recorded in the official Polish register of localities (TERYT) under the administrative hierarchy of Gmina Łagów, Świebodzin County, Lubusz Voivodeship.
