= Troszki, Lubusz Voivodeship =

Troszki, Poland
- Village
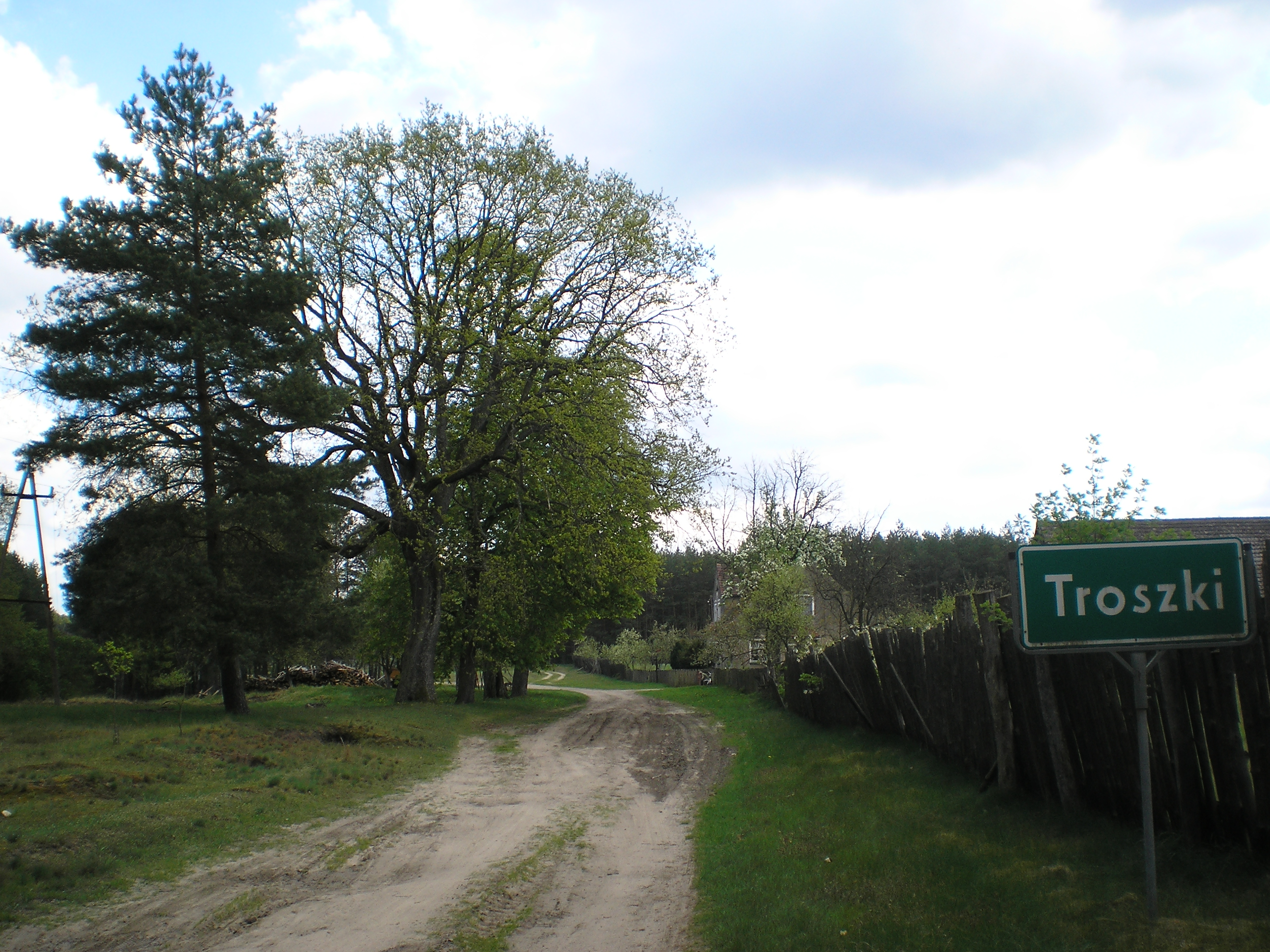
- Troszki, Gmina Łagów

- Location within Poland
- Coordinates: 52°15′N 15°12′E
- Country: Poland
- Voivodeship: Lubusz
- County: Świebodzin
- Gmina: Łagów

Troszki [ˈtrɔʂki] is a village in the administrative district of Gmina Łagów, within Świebodzin County, Lubusz Voivodeship, in western Poland.
