= Czyste, Lubusz Voivodeship =

Czyste
- Village
- Location within Poland
- Coordinates: 52°17′32″N 15°14′51″E
- Country: Poland
- Voivodeship: Lubusz
- County: Świebodzin
- Gmina: Łagów

Czyste [ˈt͡ʂɨstɛ] is a village in the administrative district of Gmina Łagów, within Świebodzin County, Lubusz Voivodeship, in western Poland.
