= Gmina Mniszków =

Gmina Mniszków Mniszków Commune
- Gmina
- Interactive map of Gmina Mniszków
- Coordinates (Mniszków): 51°22′15″N 20°2′3″E
- Country: Poland
- Voivodeship: Łódź
- County: Opoczno
- Seat: Mniszków

Area
  - Total: 123.83 km^{2} (47.81 sq mi)

Population (2006)
  - Total: 4,788
  - Density: 38.67/km^{2} (100.1/sq mi)
- Website: www.mniszkow.pl

Gmina Mniszków is a rural gmina (administrative district) in Opoczno County, Łódź Voivodeship, in central Poland. Its seat is the village of Mniszków, which lies approximately 18 kilometres (11 mi) west of Opoczno and 61 km (38 mi) south-east of the regional capital Łódź.

The gmina covers an area of 123.83 square kilometres (47.8 sq mi), and as of 2006 its total population is 4,788.

The gmina contains part of the protected area called Sulejów Landscape Park.

== Villages ==
Gmina Mniszków contains the villages and settlements of Błogie Rządowe, Błogie Szlacheckie, Bukowiec nad Pilicą, Duży Potok, Góry Trzebiatowskie, Grabowa, Jawor, Jawor-Kolonia, Julianów, Konstantynów, Małe Końskie, Marianka, Mniszków, Nowe Błogie, Olimpiów, Owczary, Prucheńsko Duże, Prucheńsko Małe, Radonia, Stoczki, Stok, Strzelce, Świeciechów, Syski, Zajączków and Zarzęcin.

== Neighbouring gminas ==
Gmina Mniszków is bordered by the gminas of Aleksandrów, Paradyż, Sławno, Sulejów, Tomaszów Mazowiecki and Wolbórz.
