= Mokry Młyn =

- Settlement
- Location within Poland
- Coordinates: 52°02′09″N 15°12′55″E
- Country: Poland
- Voivodeship: Lubusz
- County: Krosno
- Gmina: Dąbie

Mokry Młyn ([ˈmɔkrɨ ˈmwɨn]; German: Untermühle bei Tschausdorf) is a settlement in the administrative district of Gmina Dąbie, within Krosno County, Lubusz Voivodeship, in western Poland.
