= Sieniawa, Lubusz Voivodeship =

Sieniawa
- Village
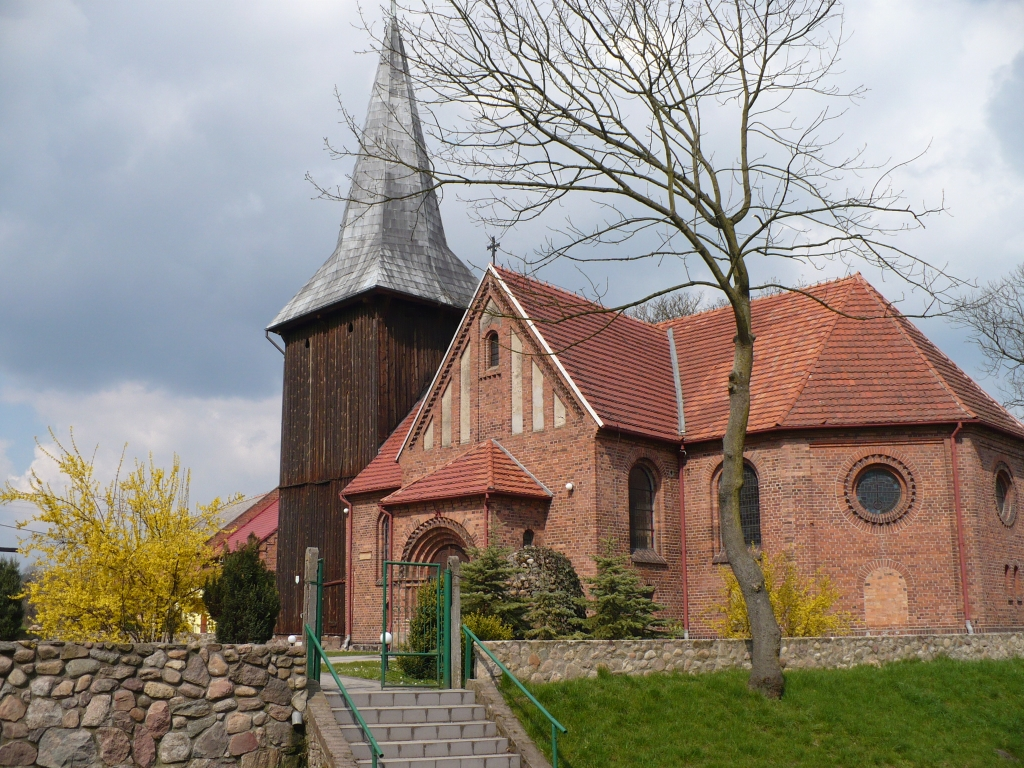
- Church of the Nativity of the Virgin Mary

- Location within Poland
- Coordinates: 52°22′N 15°22′E
- Country: Poland
- Voivodeship: Lubusz
- County: Świebodzin
- Gmina: Łagów

Population
  - Total: 1,100

Sieniawa (Polish pronunciation: [ɕɛˈɲava]) is a village in the administrative district of Gmina Łagów, within Świebodzin County, Lubusz Voivodeship, in western Poland.
