= Kłodnica, Lubusz Voivodeship =

Kłodnica
- Village
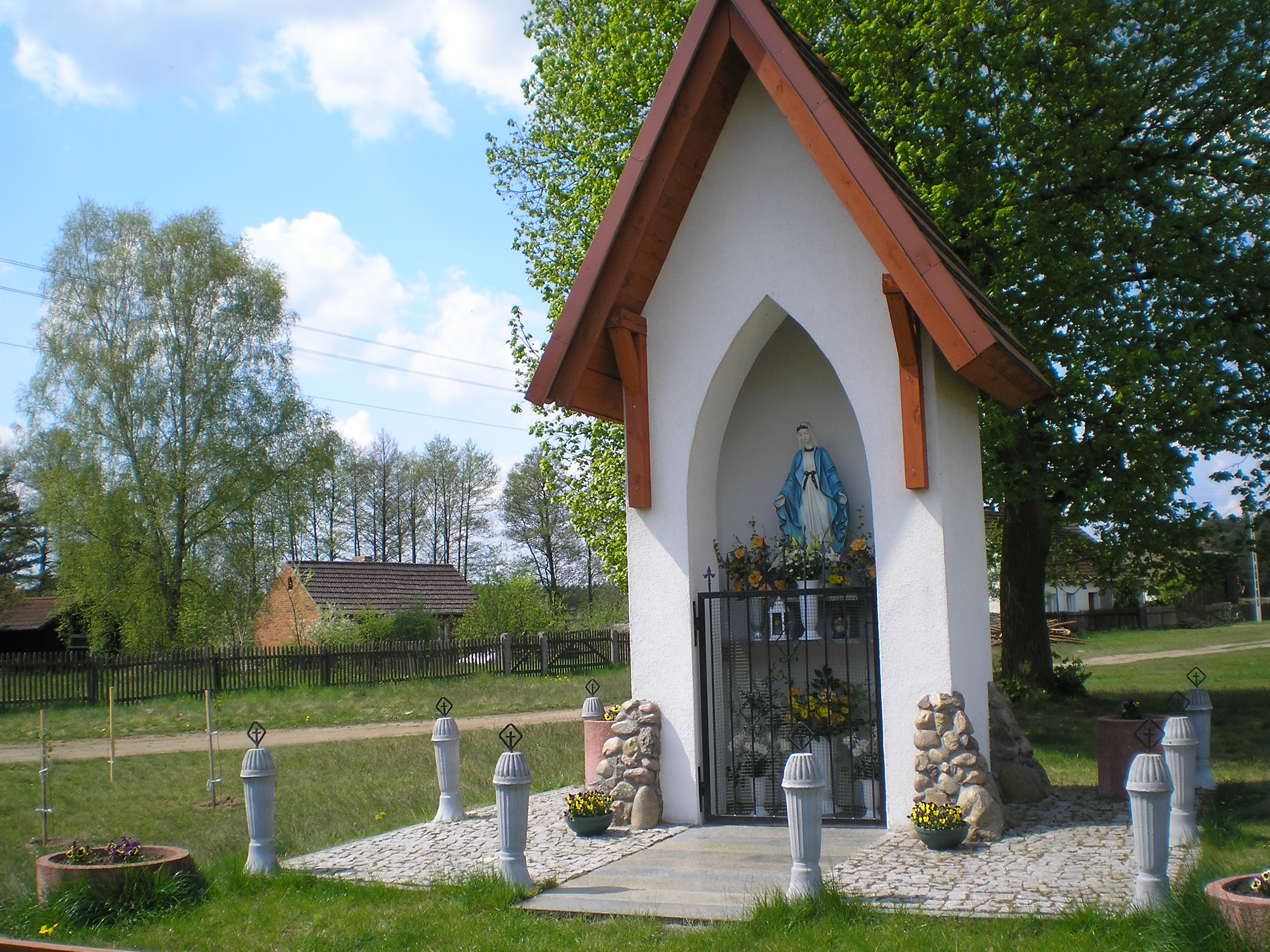
- Shrine

- Location within Poland
- Coordinates: 52°15′N 15°12′E
- Country: Poland
- Voivodeship: Lubusz
- County: Świebodzin
- Gmina: Łagów

Kłodnica [kwɔdˈnit͡sa] is a village in the administrative district of Gmina Łagów, within Świebodzin County, Lubusz Voivodeship, in western Poland.
