= Godziejów =

- Settlement
- Location within Poland
- Coordinates: 52°00′08″N 15°13′28″E
- Country: Poland
- Voivodeship: Lubusz
- County: Krosno
- Gmina: Dąbie

Godziejów ([ɡɔˈd͡ʑɛjuf]; German: Karlswille) is a settlement in the administrative district of Gmina Dąbie, within Krosno County, Lubusz Voivodeship, in western Poland.
