= Pasałka =

- Settlement
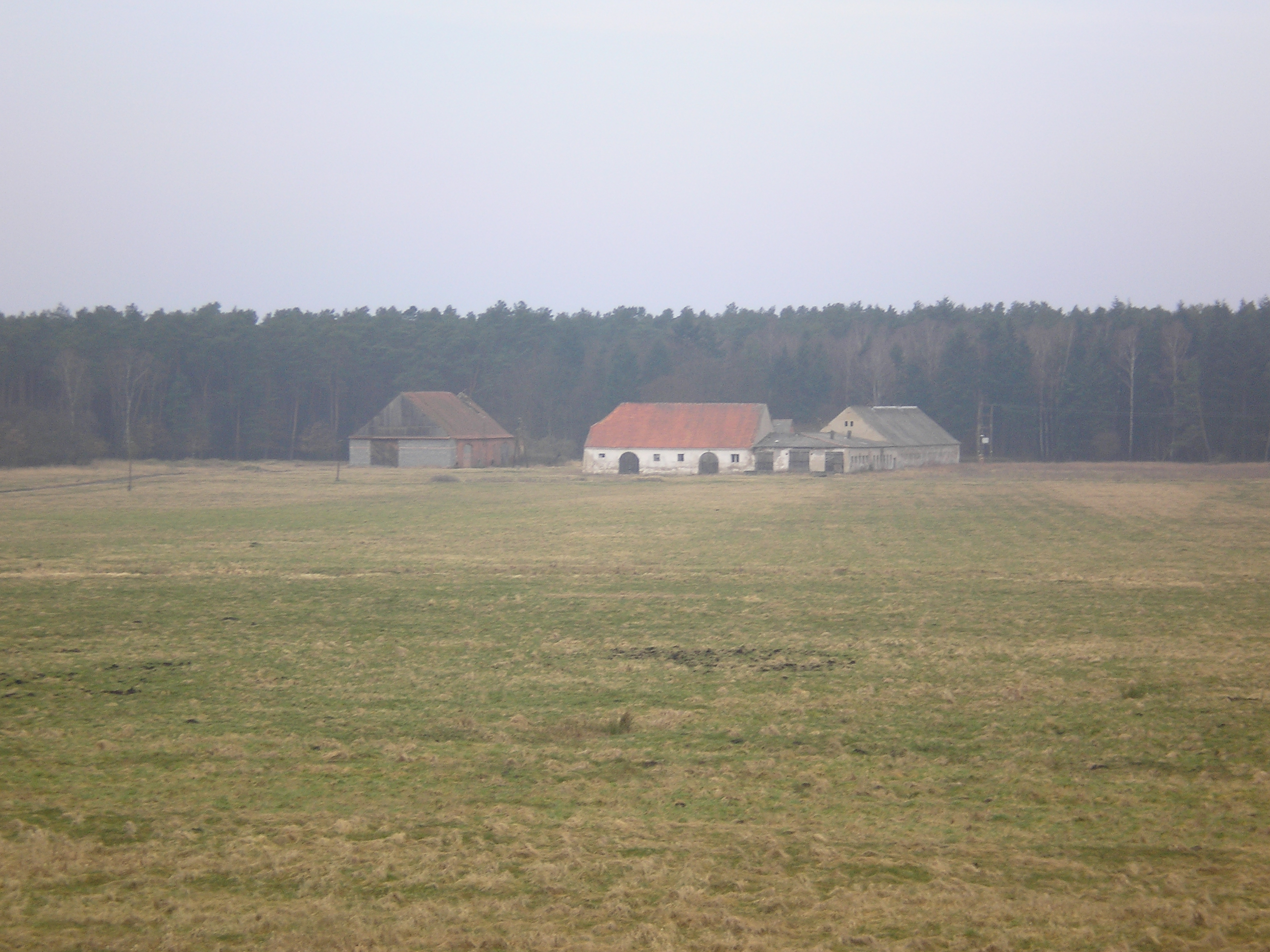

- Location within Poland
- Coordinates: 52°16′02″N 15°14′26″E
- Country: Poland
- Voivodeship: Lubusz
- County: Świebodzin
- Gmina: Łagów
- Population: 9

Pasałka [paˈsau̯ka] is a settlement in the administrative district of Gmina Łagów, within Świebodzin County, Lubusz Voivodeship, in western Poland.
