= Nowe Błogie =

- Village
- Location within Poland
- Coordinates: 51°22′23″N 19°56′38″E
- Country: Poland
- Voivodeship: Łódź
- County: Opoczno
- Gmina: Mniszków
- Population: 80

Nowe Błogie [ˈnɔvɛ ˈbwɔɡʲɛ] is a village in the administrative district of Gmina Mniszków, within Opoczno County, Łódź Voivodeship, in central Poland.
