= Grabowa, Opoczno County =

Grabowa
- Village
- Location within Poland
- Coordinates: 51°24′N 20°1′E
- Country: Poland
- Voivodeship: Łódź
- County: Opoczno
- Gmina: Mniszków

Grabowa [ɡraˈbɔva] is a village in the administrative district of Gmina Mniszków, within Opoczno County, Łódź Voivodeship, in central Poland.
