= Budynia =

- Village
- Location within Poland
- Coordinates: 51°59′N 15°8′E
- Country: Poland
- Voivodeship: Lubusz
- County: Krosno
- Gmina: Dąbie
- Population: 58

Budynia ([buˈdɨɲa]; German: Bothendorf) is a village in the administrative district of Gmina Dąbie, within Krosno County, Lubusz Voivodeship, in western Poland.
