= Julianów, Opoczno County =

Julianów
- Village
- Location within Poland
- Coordinates: 51°25′43″N 20°0′30″E
- Country: Poland
- Voivodeship: Łódź
- County: Opoczno
- Gmina: Mniszków

Julianów [juˈljanuf] is a village in the administrative district of Gmina Mniszków, within Opoczno County, Łódź Voivodeship, in central Poland.
