= Prucheńsko Duże =

- Village
- Location within Poland
- Coordinates: 51°22′38″N 19°55′17″E
- Country: Poland
- Voivodeship: Łódź
- County: Opoczno
- Gmina: Mniszków

Prucheńsko Duże [pruˈxɛɲskɔ ˈduʐɛ] is a village in the administrative district of Gmina Mniszków, within Opoczno County, Łódź Voivodeship, in central Poland.
