= Kosobudz =

- Village
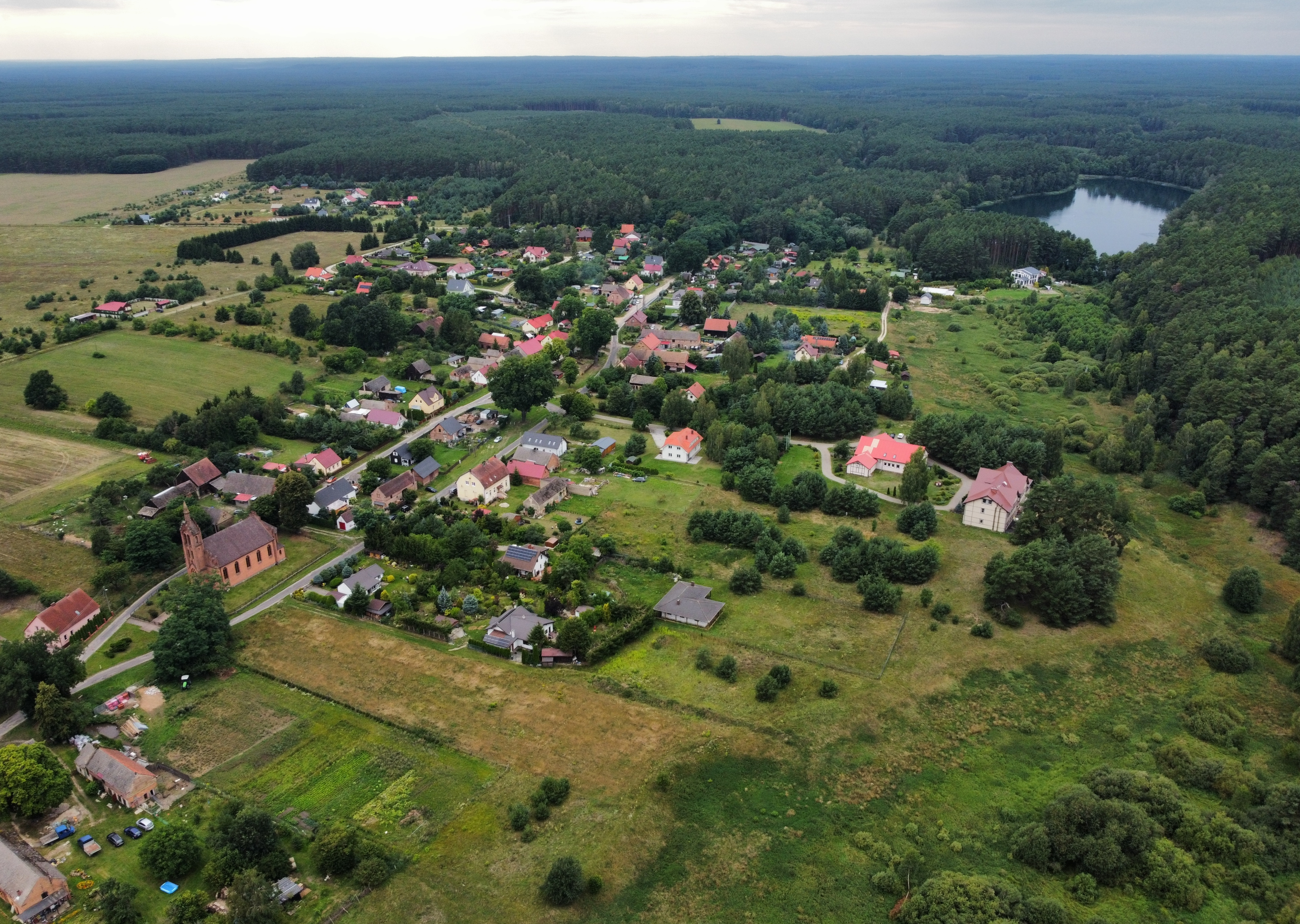
- Aerial view of Kosobudz

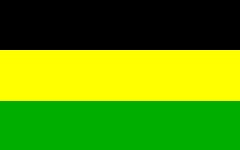
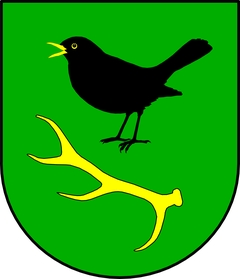
- Flag Coat of arms

- Location within Poland
- Coordinates: 52°14′N 15°14′E
- Country: Poland
- Voivodeship: Lubusz
- County: Świebodzin
- Gmina: Łagów
- Time zone: UTC+1 (CET)
  - Summer (DST): UTC+2 (CEST)
- Vehicle registration: FSW
- Website: http://www.kosobudz.eu

Kosobudz [kɔˈsɔbut͡s] is a village in the administrative district of Gmina Łagów, within Świebodzin County, Lubusz Voivodeship, in western Poland.
