= Suchy Młyn =

- Settlement
- Location within Poland
- Coordinates: 52°01′44″N 15°12′44″E
- Country: Poland
- Voivodeship: Lubusz
- County: Krosno
- Gmina: Dąbie

Suchy Młyn ([ˈsuxɨ ˈmwɨn]; German: Obermühle) is a settlement in the administrative district of Gmina Dąbie, within Krosno County, Lubusz Voivodeship, in western Poland.
