= Szczawno, Lubusz Voivodeship =

Szczawno
- Village
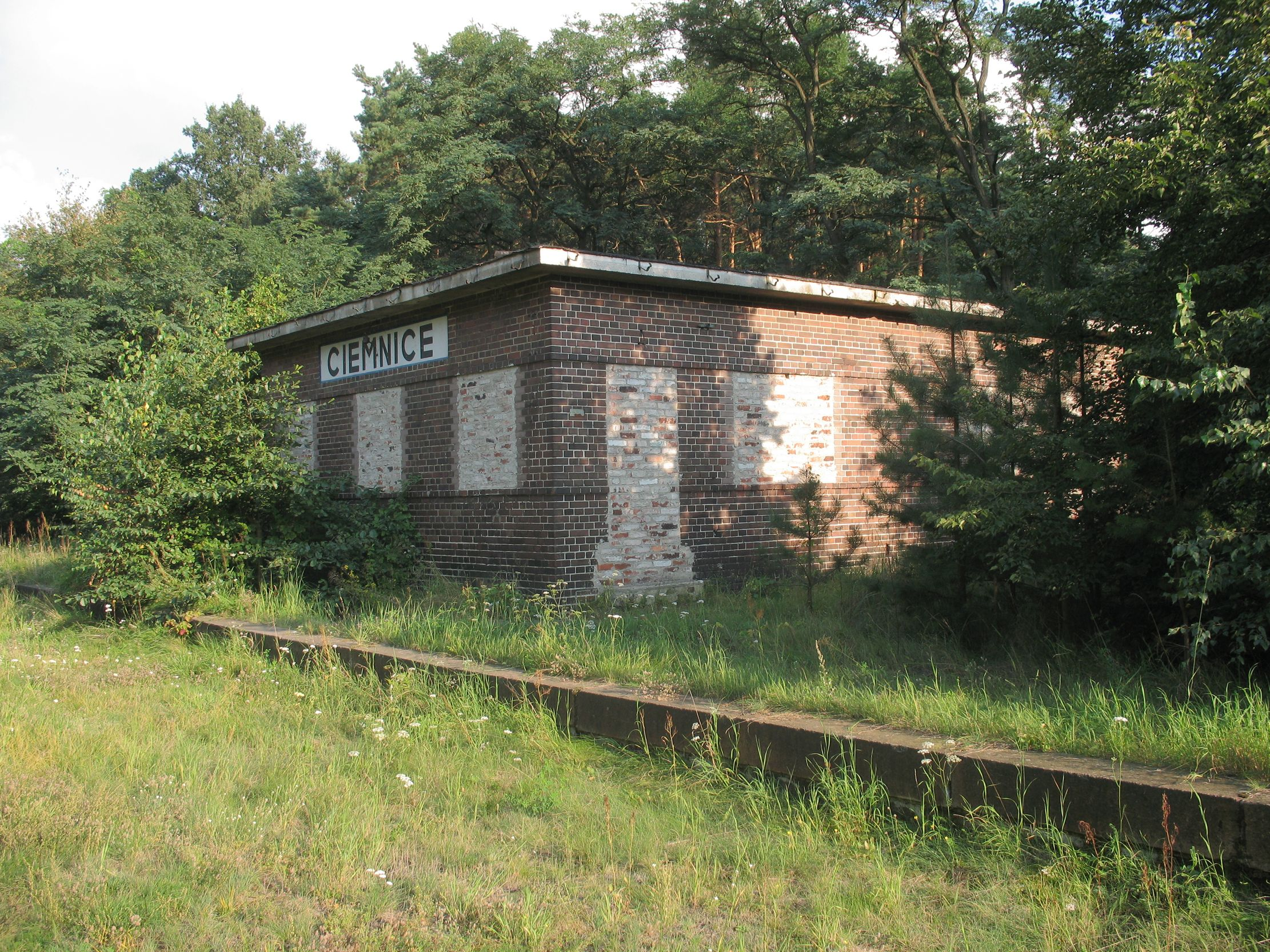
- Railway station

- Location within Poland
- Coordinates: 52°2′N 15°13′E
- Country: Poland
- Voivodeship: Lubusz
- County: Krosno
- Gmina: Dąbie

Szczawno ([ˈʂt͡ʂavnɔ]; German: Tschausdorf, 1937–45 Schausdorf) is a village in the administrative district of Gmina Dąbie, within Krosno County, Lubusz Voivodeship, in western Poland.
