= Ciemnice =

- Village
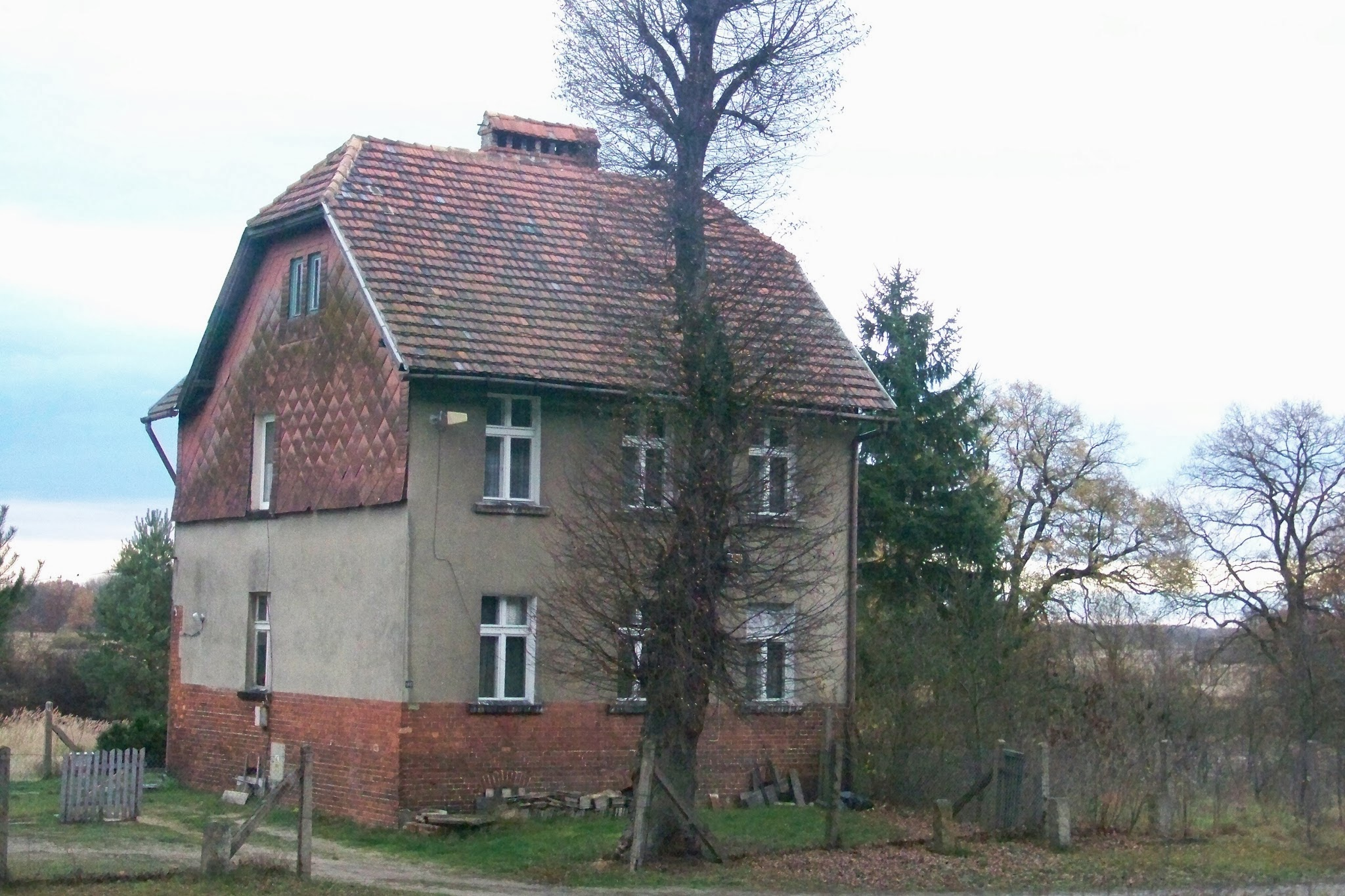

- Location within Poland
- Coordinates: 52°1′50″N 15°14′53″E
- Country: Poland
- Voivodeship: Lubusz
- County: Krosno
- Gmina: Dąbie
- Population: 458

Ciemnice ([t͡ɕɛmˈnit͡sɛ]; German: Thiemendorf) is a village in the administrative district of Gmina Dąbie, within Krosno County, Lubusz Voivodeship, in western Poland.
