= Kosobudki, Lubusz Voivodeship =

Kosobudki
- Village
- Location within Poland
- Coordinates: 52°14′52″N 15°10′29″E
- Country: Poland
- Voivodeship: Lubusz
- County: Świebodzin
- Gmina: Łagów

Kosobudki [kɔsɔˈbutki] is a village in the administrative district of Gmina Łagów, within Świebodzin County, Lubusz Voivodeship, in western Poland.
