= Niedźwiedź, Lubusz Voivodeship =

Niedźwiedź
- Village
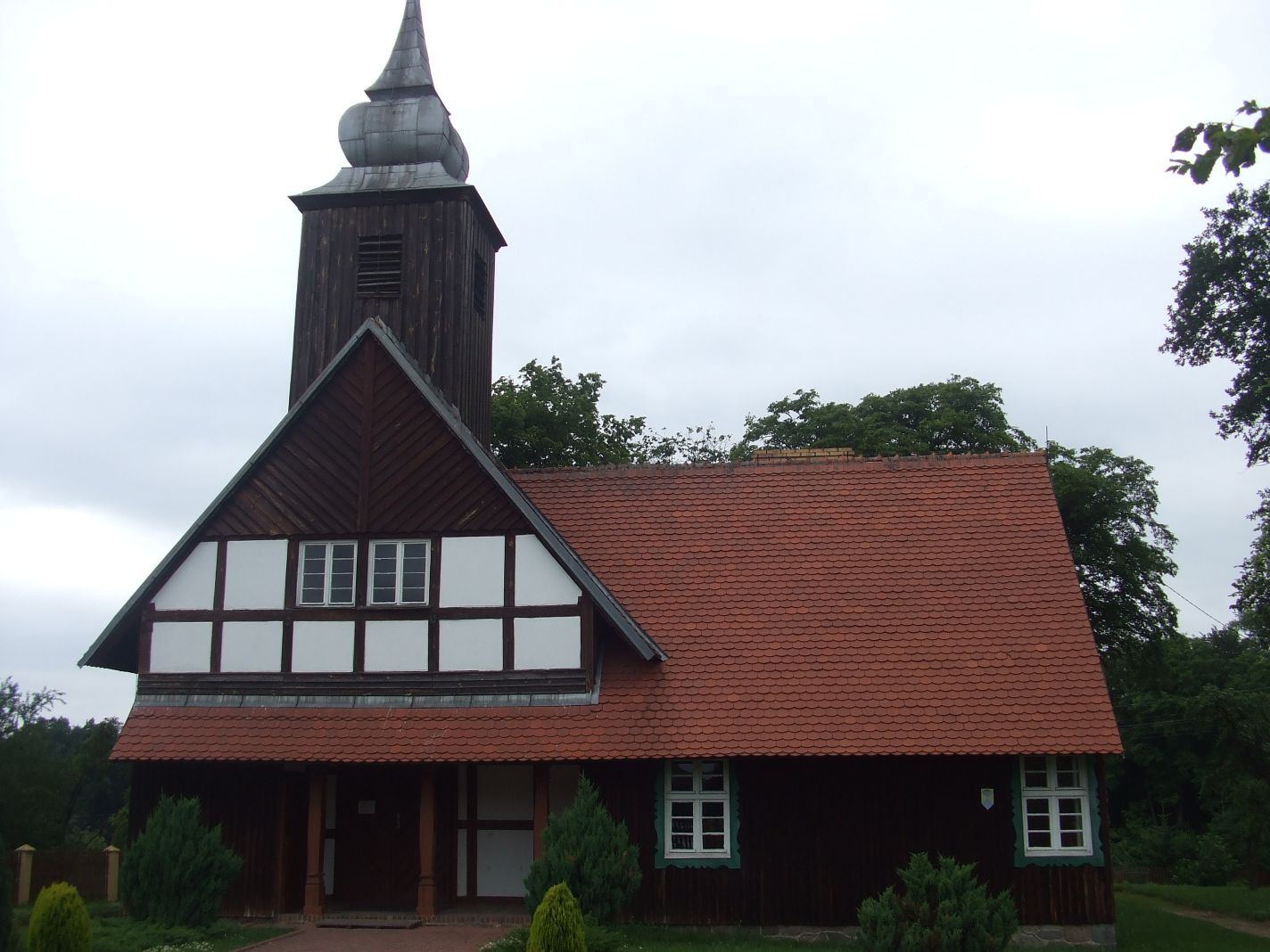
- Church in Niedźwiedź

- Location within Poland
- Coordinates: 52°13′N 15°18′E
- Country: Poland
- Voivodeship: Lubusz
- County: Świebodzin
- Gmina: Łagów
- Time zone: UTC+1 (CET)
  - Summer (DST): UTC+2 (CEST)
- Vehicle registration: FSW

Niedźwiedź [ˈɲɛd͡ʑvjɛt͡ɕ] is a village in the administrative district of Gmina Łagów, within Świebodzin County, Lubusz Voivodeship, in western Poland.

Two Polish citizens were murdered by Nazi Germany in the village during World War II.
