= Połupin =

- Village
- Location within Poland
- Coordinates: 52°2′N 15°8′E
- Country: Poland
- Voivodeship: Lubusz
- County: Krosno
- Gmina: Dąbie

Połupin ([pɔˈwupin]; German: Rusdorf) is a village in the administrative district of Gmina Dąbie, within Krosno County, Lubusz Voivodeship, in western Poland.
