= Gola, Krosno County =

Gola
- Village
- Location within Poland
- Coordinates: 51°59′N 15°6′E
- Country: Poland
- Voivodeship: Lubusz
- County: Krosno
- Gmina: Dąbie

Gola ([ˈɡɔla]; German: Guhlow) is a village in the administrative district of Gmina Dąbie, within Krosno County, Lubusz Voivodeship, in western Poland.
