= Konstantynów, Opoczno County =

Konstantynów
- Village
- Location within Poland
- Coordinates: 51°23′N 19°59′E
- Country: Poland
- Voivodeship: Łódź
- County: Opoczno
- Gmina: Mniszków
- Population (approx.): 150

Konstantynów [kɔnstanˈtɨnuf] is a village in the administrative district of Gmina Mniszków, within Opoczno County, Łódź Voivodeship, in central Poland.
