= Jawor-Kolonia =

- Village
- Location within Poland
- Coordinates: 51°22′09″N 20°04′12″E
- Country: Poland
- Voivodeship: Łódź
- County: Opoczno
- Gmina: Mniszków

Jawor-Kolonia [ˈjavɔr kɔˈlɔɲa] is a village in the administrative district of Gmina Mniszków, within Opoczno County, Łódź Voivodeship, in central Poland.
