= Dąbki, Lubusz Voivodeship =

Dąbki
- Village
- Location within Poland
- Coordinates: 52°00′06″N 15°04′20″E
- Country: Poland
- Voivodeship: Lubusz
- County: Krosno
- Gmina: Dąbie

Dąbki ([ˈdɔmpki]; German: Fritschendorf) is a village in the administrative district of Gmina Dąbie, within Krosno County, Lubusz Voivodeship, in western Poland.
