= Olimpiów =

- Village
- Location within Poland
- Coordinates: 51°20′40″N 20°00′33″E
- Country: Poland
- Voivodeship: Łódź
- County: Opoczno
- Gmina: Mniszków

Olimpiów [ɔˈlimpjuf] is a village in the administrative district of Gmina Mniszków, within Opoczno County, Łódź Voivodeship, in central Poland.
