= Duży Potok =

- Village
- Location within Poland
- Coordinates: 51°25′24″N 20°04′28″E
- Country: Poland
- Voivodeship: Łódź
- County: Opoczno
- Gmina: Mniszków

Duży Potok [ˈduʐɨ ˈpɔtɔk] is a village in the administrative district of Gmina Mniszków, within Opoczno County, Łódź Voivodeship, in central Poland.
