= Kosierz =

- Village
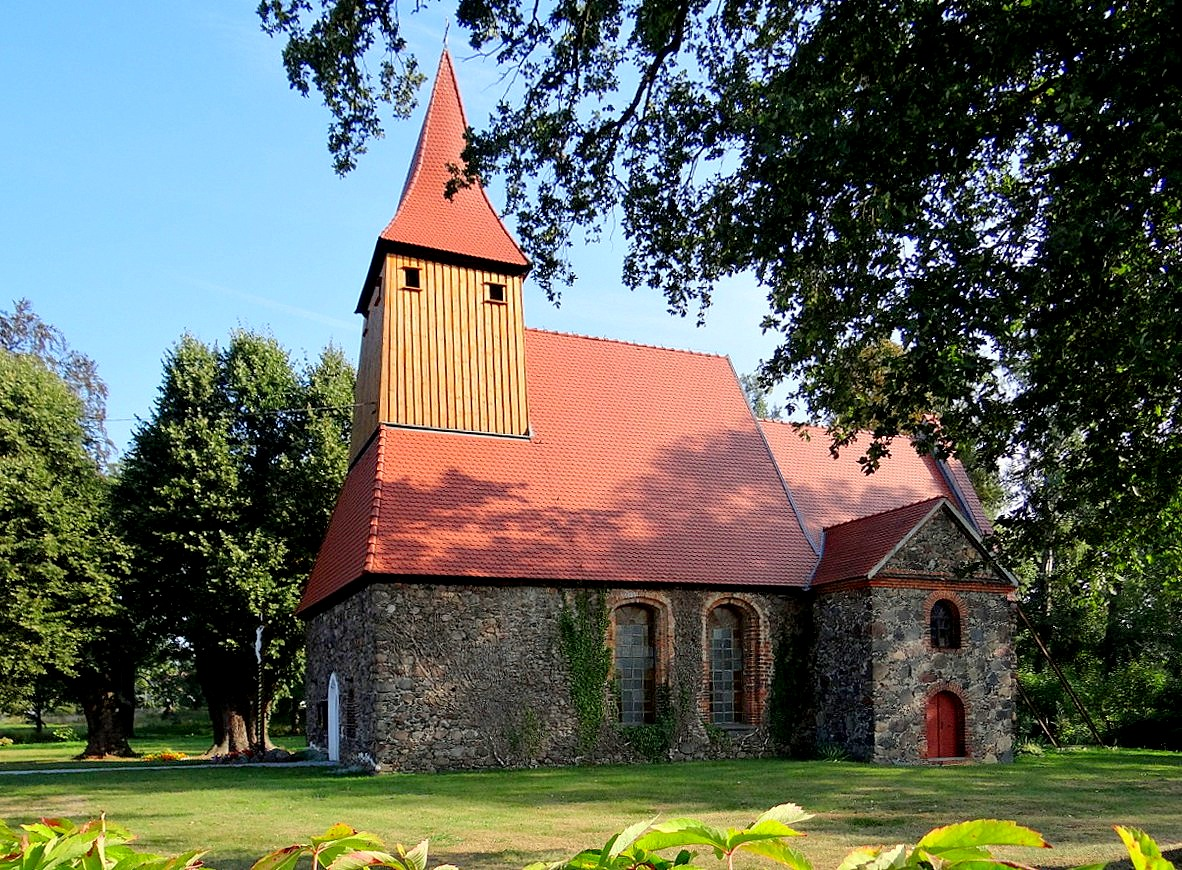
- Catholic church

- Location within Poland
- Coordinates: 51°57′N 15°10′E
- Country: Poland
- Voivodeship: Lubusz
- County: Krosno
- Gmina: Dąbie

Kosierz ([ˈkɔɕɛʂ]; German: Kossar) is a village in the administrative district of Gmina Dąbie, within Krosno County, Lubusz Voivodeship, in western Poland.
