= Gmina Łagów =

Gmina Łagów may refer to either of the following rural administrative districts in Poland:

- Gmina Łagów, Świętokrzyskie Voivodeship
- Gmina Łagów, Lubusz Voivodeship
