= Bukowiec nad Pilicą =

- Village
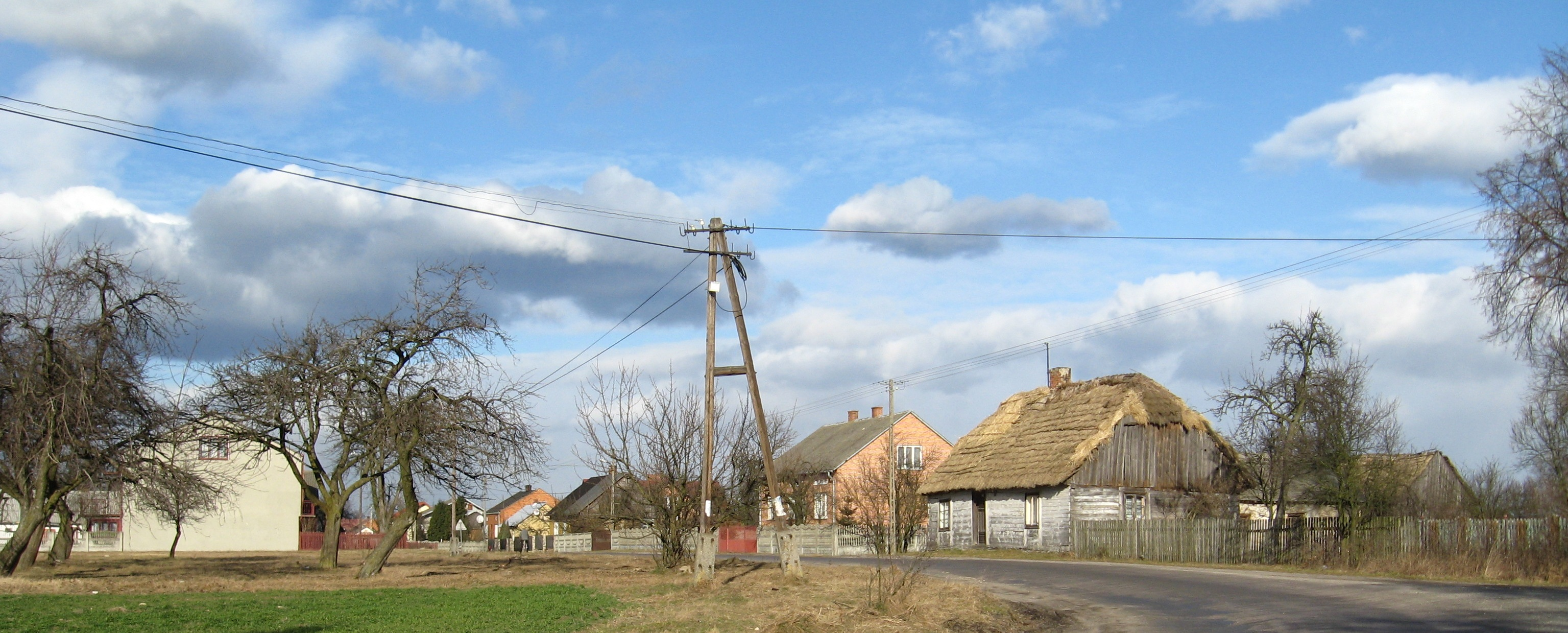
- Bukowiec nad Pilicą in 2008

- Location within Poland
- Coordinates: 51°26′N 20°2′E
- Country: Poland
- Voivodeship: Łódź
- County: Opoczno
- Gmina: Mniszków
- Website: http://www.bukowiec.yoyo.pl

Bukowiec nad Pilicą [buˈkɔvjɛt͡s ˌnat piˈlit͡sɔ̃] is a village in the administrative district of Gmina Mniszków, within Opoczno County, Łódź Voivodeship, in central Poland.
