= Lubiatów, Krosno County =

Lubiatów
- Village
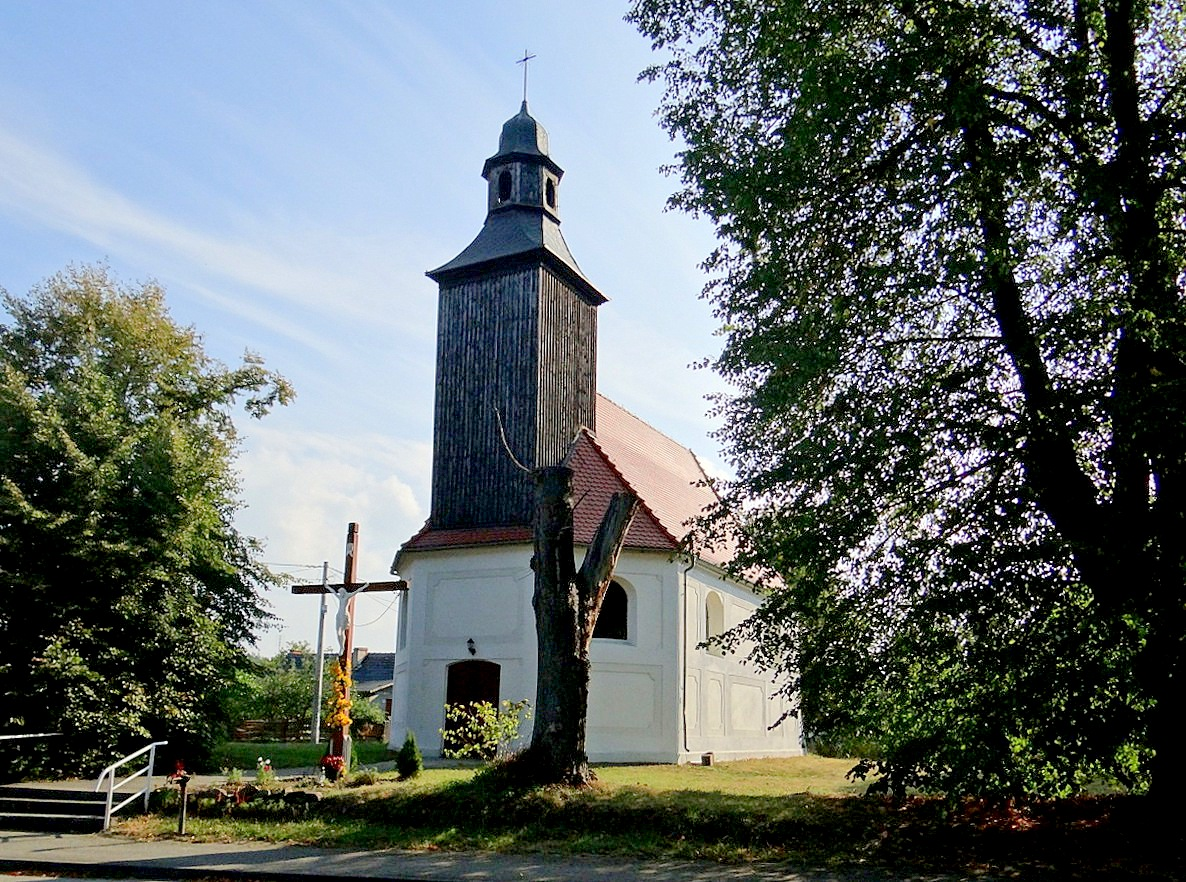
- Catholic church

- Location within Poland
- Coordinates: 51°56′N 15°12′E
- Country: Poland
- Voivodeship: Lubusz
- County: Krosno
- Gmina: Dąbie

Lubiatów ([luˈbjatuf]; German: Liebthal) is a village in the administrative district of Gmina Dąbie, within Krosno County, Lubusz Voivodeship, in western Poland.
