= Poźrzadło =

- Village
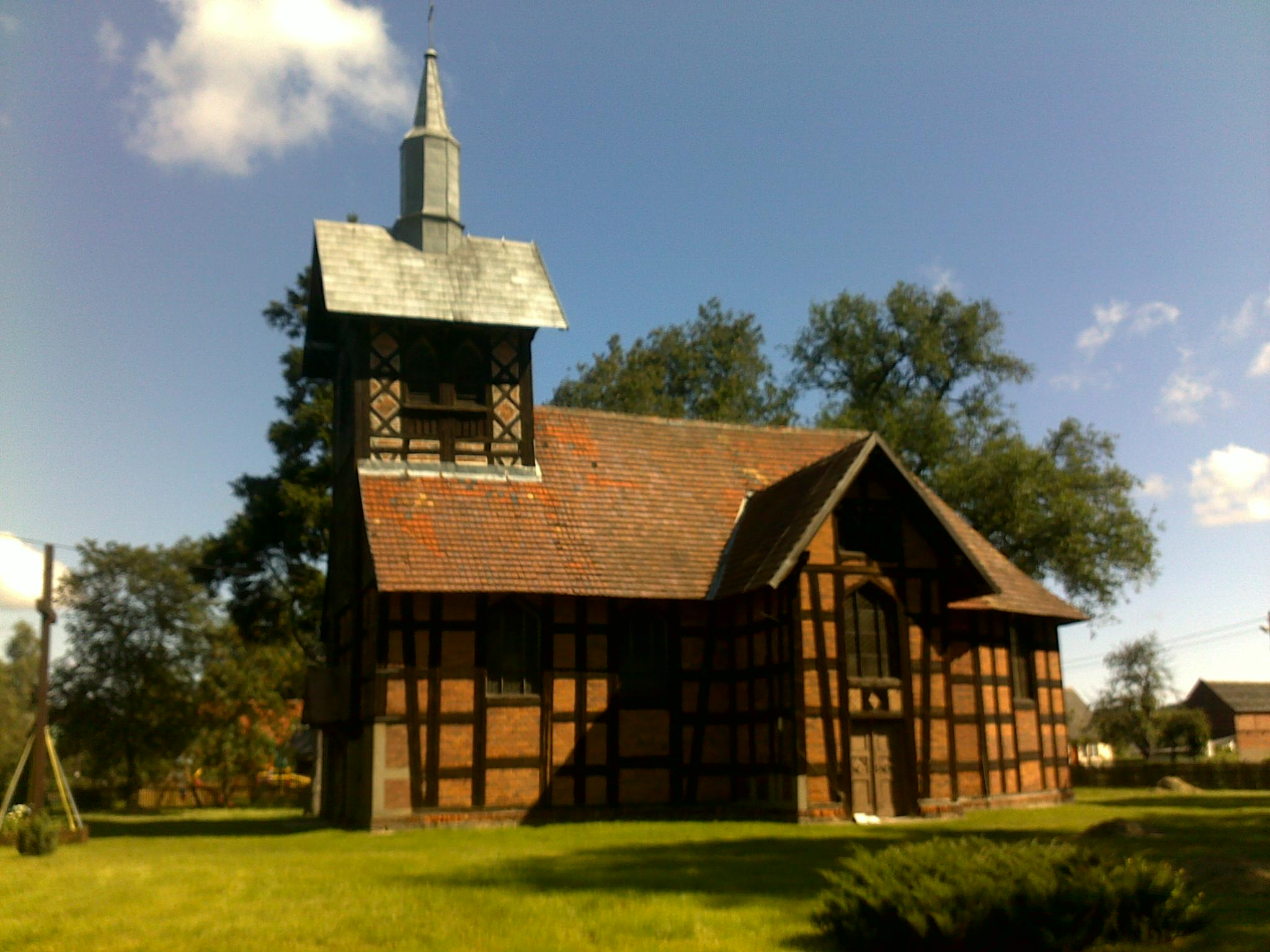
- Church in Poźrzadło

- Location within Poland
- Coordinates: 52°17′54″N 15°14′46″E
- Country: Poland
- Voivodeship: Lubusz
- County: Świebodzin
- Gmina: Łagów
- Time zone: UTC+1 (CET)
  - Summer (DST): UTC+2 (CEST)
- Vehicle registration: FSW

Poźrzadło [pɔˈʑʐadwɔ] is a village in the administrative district of Gmina Łagów, within Świebodzin County, Lubusz Voivodeship, in western Poland.

During World War II, in 1940–1943, Nazi Germany operated a forced labour camp for Jewish men in the village.
