= Jawor, Opoczno County =

Jawor
- Village
- Location within Poland
- Coordinates: 51°22′03″N 20°03′23″E
- Country: Poland
- Voivodeship: Łódź
- County: Opoczno
- Gmina: Mniszków

Jawor [ˈjavɔr] is a village in the administrative district of Gmina Mniszków, within Opoczno County, Łódź Voivodeship, in central Poland.
