= Góry Trzebiatowskie =

- Village
- Location within Poland
- Coordinates: 51°25′12″N 20°0′15″E
- Country: Poland
- Voivodeship: Łódź
- County: Opoczno
- Gmina: Mniszków

Góry Trzebiatowskie [ˈɡurɨ tʂɛbjaˈtɔfskʲɛ] is a village in the administrative district of Gmina Mniszków, within Opoczno County, Łódź Voivodeship, in central Poland.
