= Brzeźnica, Krosno County =

Brzeźnica
- Village
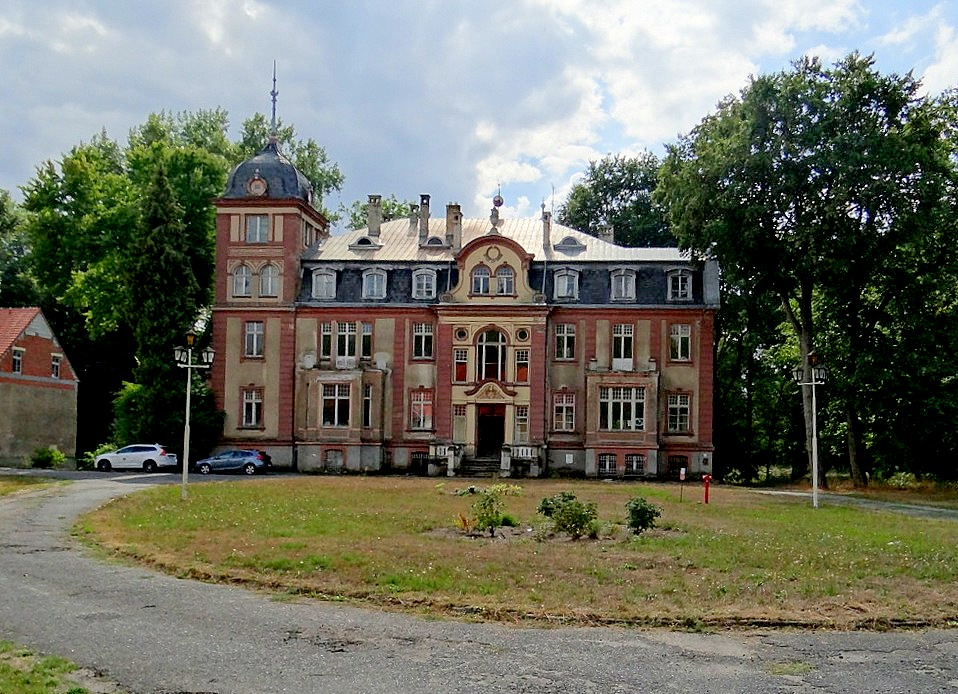
- Palace

- Location within Poland
- Coordinates: 51°59′49″N 15°07′42″E
- Country: Poland
- Voivodeship: Lubusz
- County: Krosno
- Gmina: Dąbie
- Population: 150

Brzeźnica ([bʐɛʑˈnit͡sa]; German: Briesnitz) is a village in the administrative district of Gmina Dąbie, within Krosno County, Lubusz Voivodeship, in western Poland.
