= Dąbie, Lubusz Voivodeship =

Dąbie
- Village
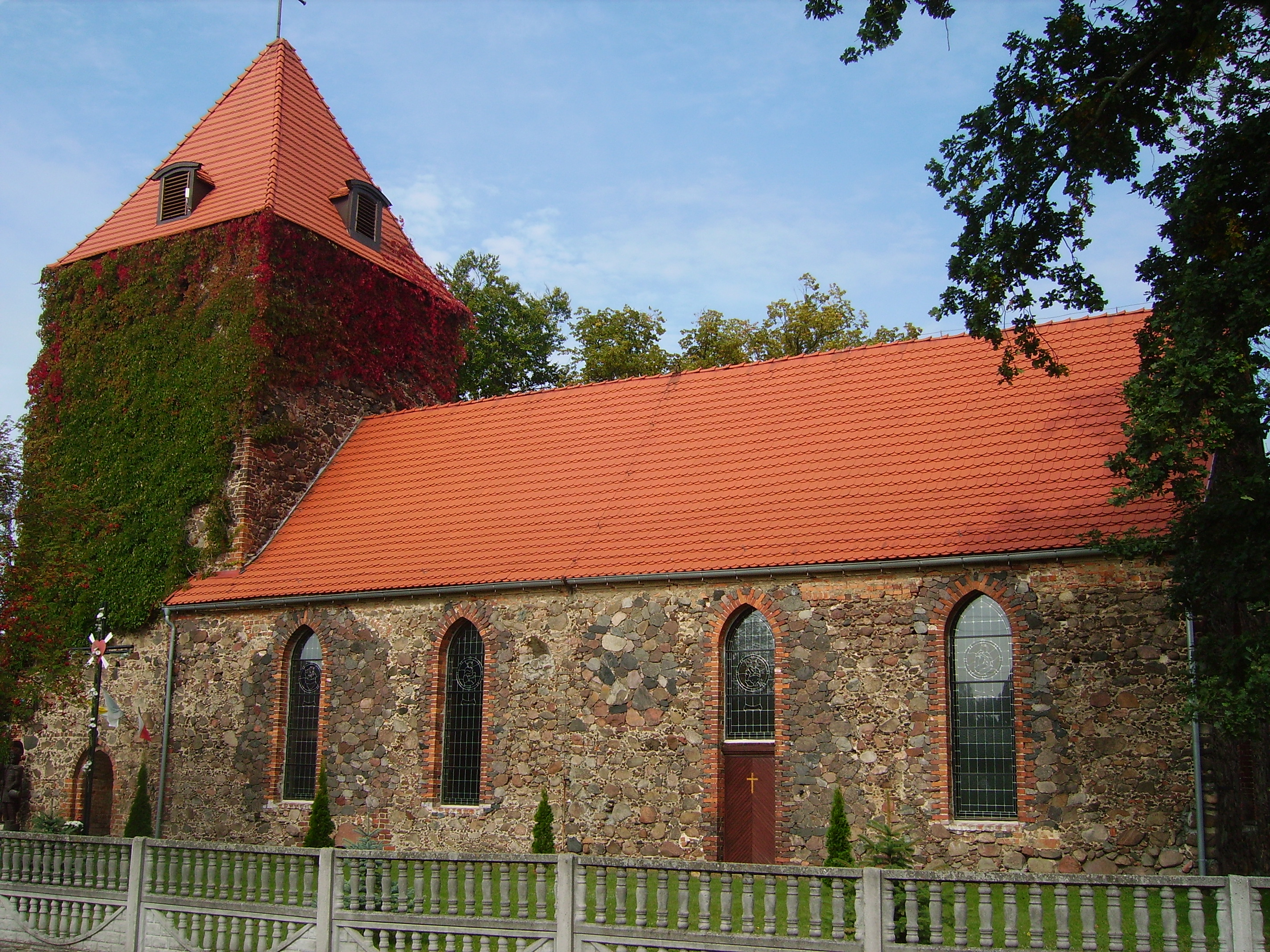
- Church of the Sacred Heart

- Location within Poland
- Coordinates: 52°1′N 15°9′E
- Country: Poland
- Voivodeship: Lubusz
- County: Krosno
- Gmina: Dąbie

Population
  - Total: 417
- Website: http://www.dabie.pl

Dąbie ([ˈdɔmbjɛ]; German: Gersdorf) is a village in Krosno County, Lubusz Voivodeship, in western Poland. It is the seat of the gmina (administrative district) called Gmina Dąbie.
