= Toporów, Lubusz Voivodeship =

Toporów
- Village
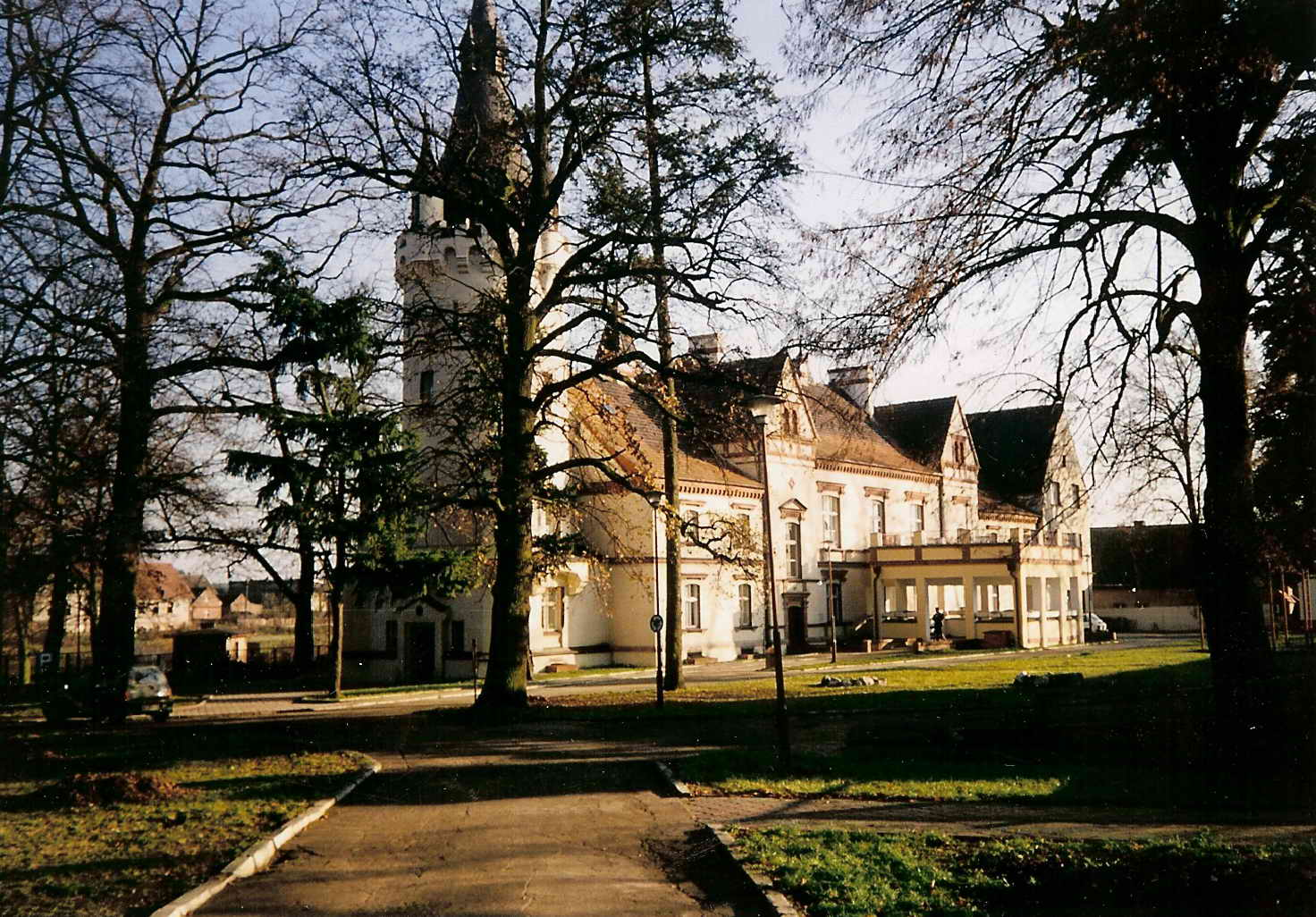
- Hunter's Palace

- Location within Poland
- Coordinates: 52°15′N 15°15′E
- Country: Poland
- Voivodeship: Lubusz
- Powiat: Świebodzin
- Gmina: Łagów
- Established: 13th century

Government
  - Mayor: Józef Aftyka

Population (2002)
  - Total: 807
- Time zone: UTC+1 (CET)
  - Summer (DST): UTC+2 (CEST)
- Postal code: 66-220
- Area code: +48 683411...
- Vehicle registration: FZW

Toporów [tɔˈpɔruf] is a village in the administrative district of Gmina Łagów, within Świebodzin County, Lubusz Voivodeship, in western Poland.

Landmarks of Toporów are the Renaissance Revival-Gothic Revival Toporów Hunting Palace, the Our Lady of the Rosary church, and an over 700-year-old pedunculate oak with a circumference of 8.7 meters, growing near the church.

== Transport ==
The village is located on European route E30.
