= Prucheńsko Małe =

- Village
- Location within Poland
- Coordinates: 51°23′01″N 19°56′07″E
- Country: Poland
- Voivodeship: Łódź
- County: Opoczno
- Gmina: Mniszków

Prucheńsko Małe [pruˈxɛɲskɔ ˈmawɛ] is a village in the administrative district of Gmina Mniszków, within Opoczno County, Łódź Voivodeship, in central Poland.
