= Stoczki, Opoczno County =

Stoczki
- Village
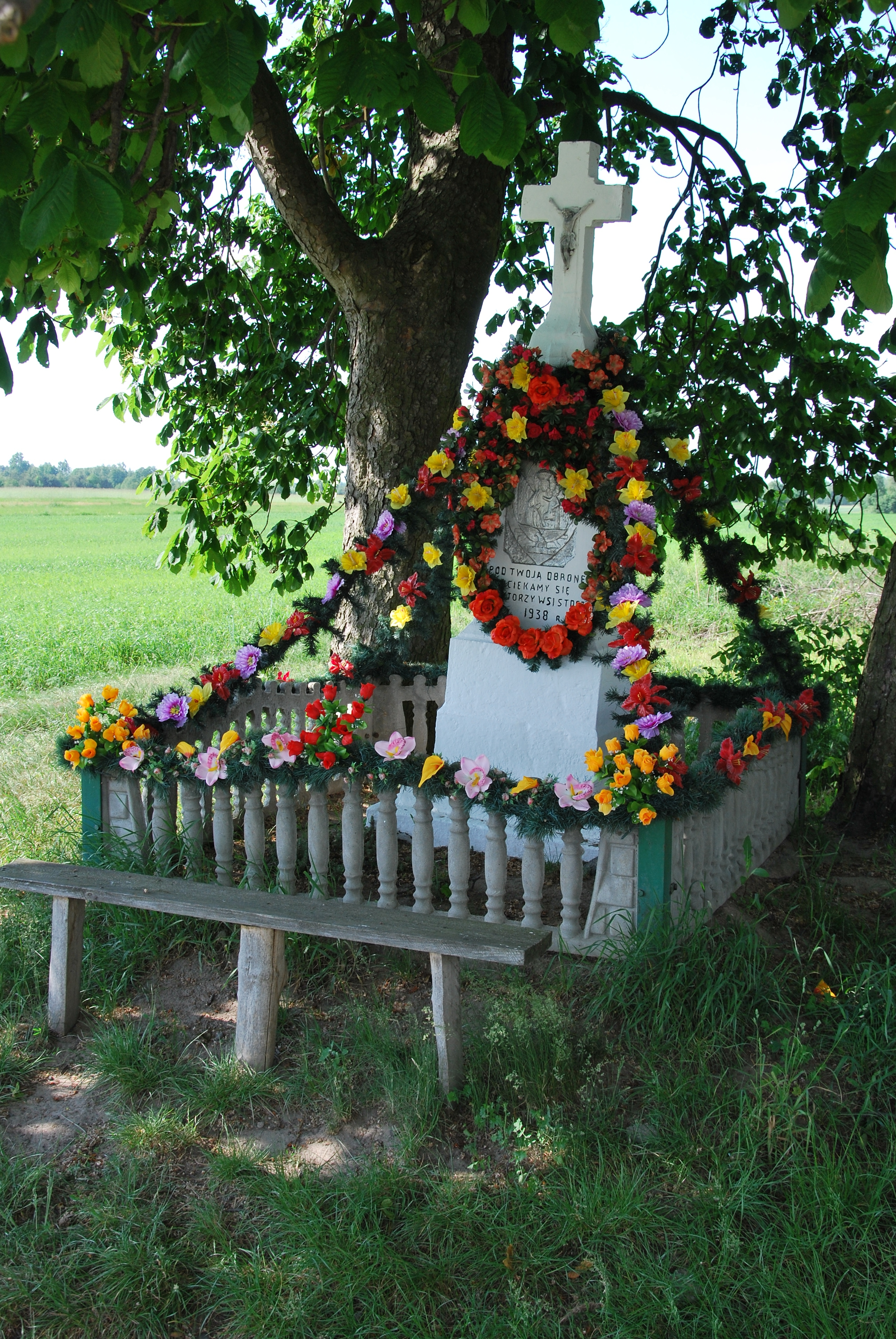

- Location within Poland
- Coordinates: 51°22′N 19°59′E
- Country: Poland
- Voivodeship: Łódź
- County: Opoczno
- Gmina: Mniszków

Stoczki [ˈstɔt͡ʂki] is a village in the administrative district of Gmina Mniszków, within Opoczno County, Łódź Voivodeship, in central Poland.
