= Stary Zagór =

- Village
- Location within Poland
- Coordinates: 51°59′13″N 15°04′53″E
- Country: Poland
- Voivodeship: Lubusz
- County: Krosno
- Gmina: Dąbie

Stary Zagór ([ˈstarɨ ˈzaɡur]; German: Wendisch Sagar, 1937–45 Bobertal) is a village in the administrative district of Gmina Dąbie, within Krosno County, Lubusz Voivodeship, in western Poland.
