= Zamęt =

- Village
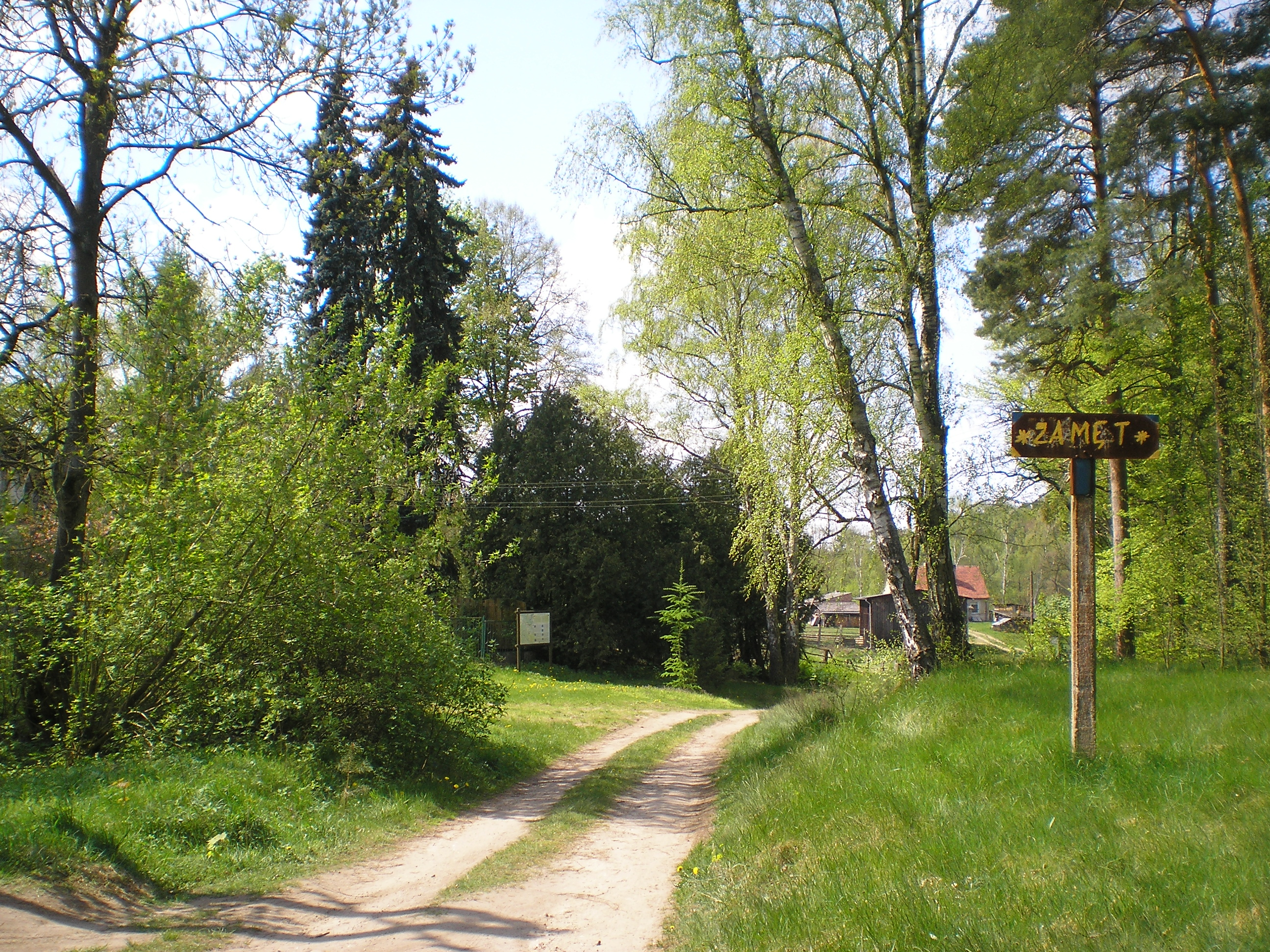

- Location within Poland
- Coordinates: 52°15′21″N 15°11′03″E
- Country: Poland
- Voivodeship: Lubusz
- County: Świebodzin
- Gmina: Łagów

Zamęt [ˈzamɛnt] is a village in the administrative district of Gmina Łagów, within Świebodzin County, Lubusz Voivodeship, in western Poland.
