= Gronów, Krosno County =

Gronów
- Village
- Location within Poland
- Coordinates: 51°59′11″N 15°13′53″E
- Country: Poland
- Voivodeship: Lubusz
- County: Krosno
- Gmina: Dąbie

Gronów ([ˈɡrɔnuf]; German: Grunow) is a village in the administrative district of Gmina Dąbie, within Krosno County, Lubusz Voivodeship, in western Poland.
