= Zajączków, Łódź Voivodeship =

Zajączków
- Village
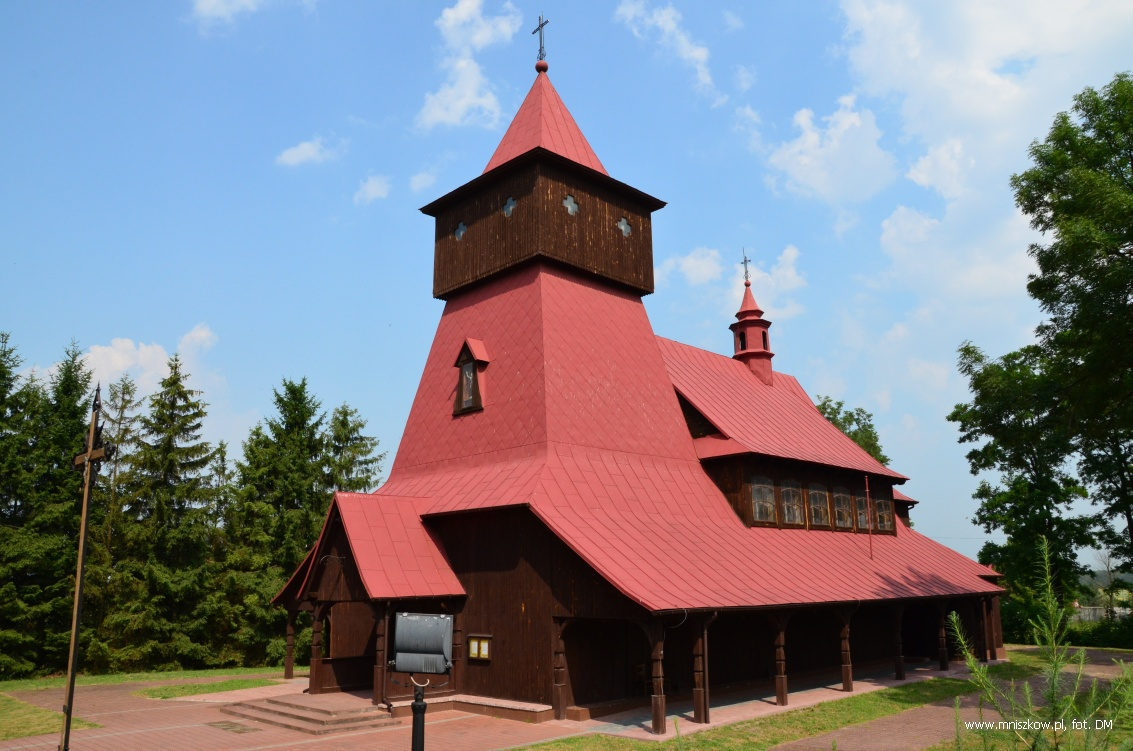
- Catholic church

- Location within Poland
- Coordinates: 51°25′N 20°3′E
- Country: Poland
- Voivodeship: Łódź
- County: Opoczno
- Gmina: Mniszków

Zajączków [zaˈjɔnt͡ʂkuf] is a village in the administrative district of Gmina Mniszków, within Opoczno County, Łódź Voivodeship, in central Poland.
