= Nowy Zagór =

- Village
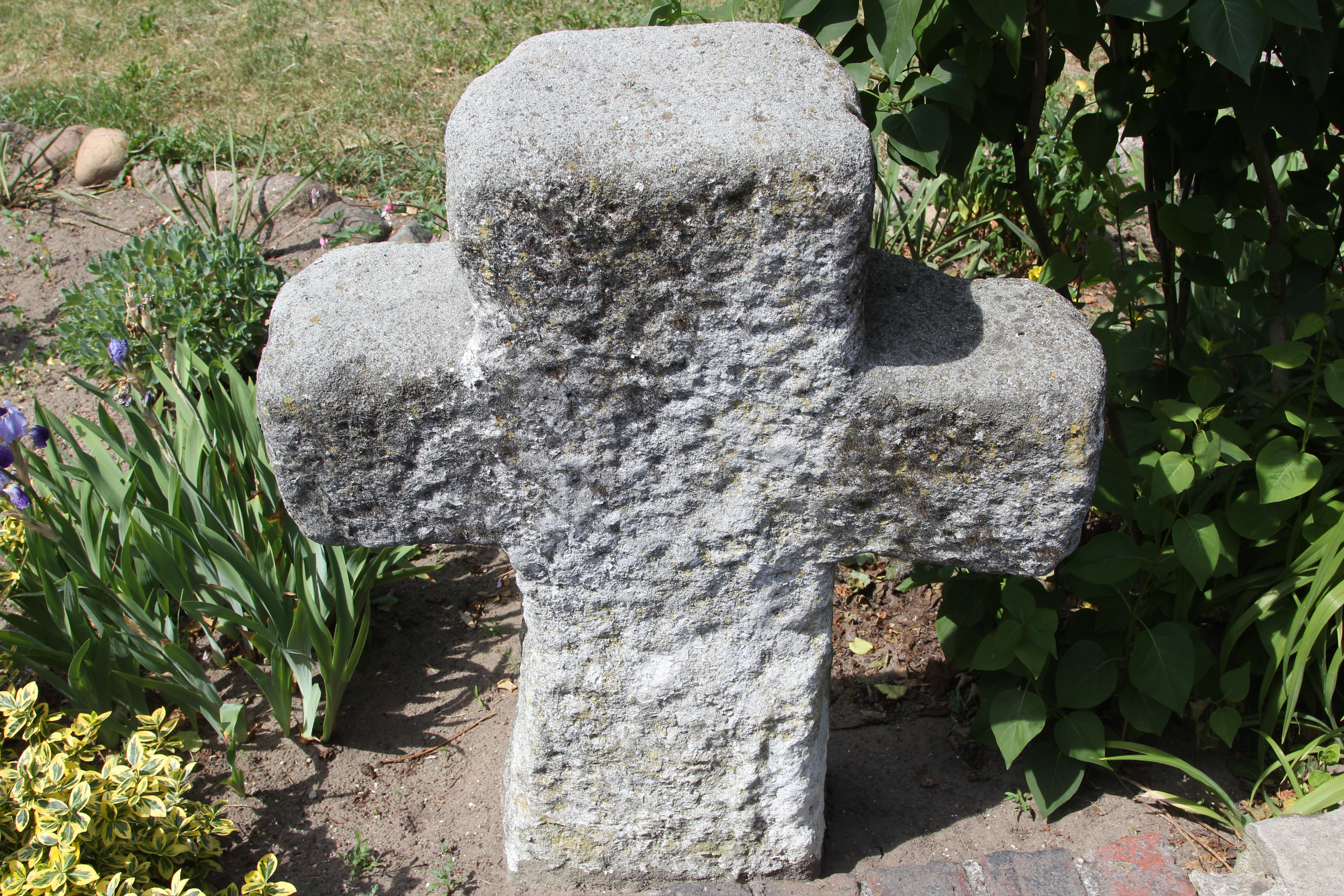
- Stone cross

- Location within Poland
- Coordinates: 52°0′N 15°5′E
- Country: Poland
- Voivodeship: Lubusz
- County: Krosno
- Gmina: Dąbie

Nowy Zagór ([ˈnɔvɨ ˈzaɡur]; German: Deutsch Sagar, 1937–45 Boberhöh) is a village in the administrative district of Gmina Dąbie, within Krosno County, Lubusz Voivodeship, in western Poland.
