= Owczary, Łódź Voivodeship =

Owczary
- Village
- Location within Poland
- Coordinates: 51°22′N 19°55′E
- Country: Poland
- Voivodeship: Łódź
- County: Opoczno
- Gmina: Mniszków

Owczary [ɔfˈt͡ʂarɨ] is a village in the administrative district of Gmina Mniszków, within Opoczno County, Łódź Voivodeship, in central Poland.
