= Gronów, Świebodzin County =

Gronów
- Village
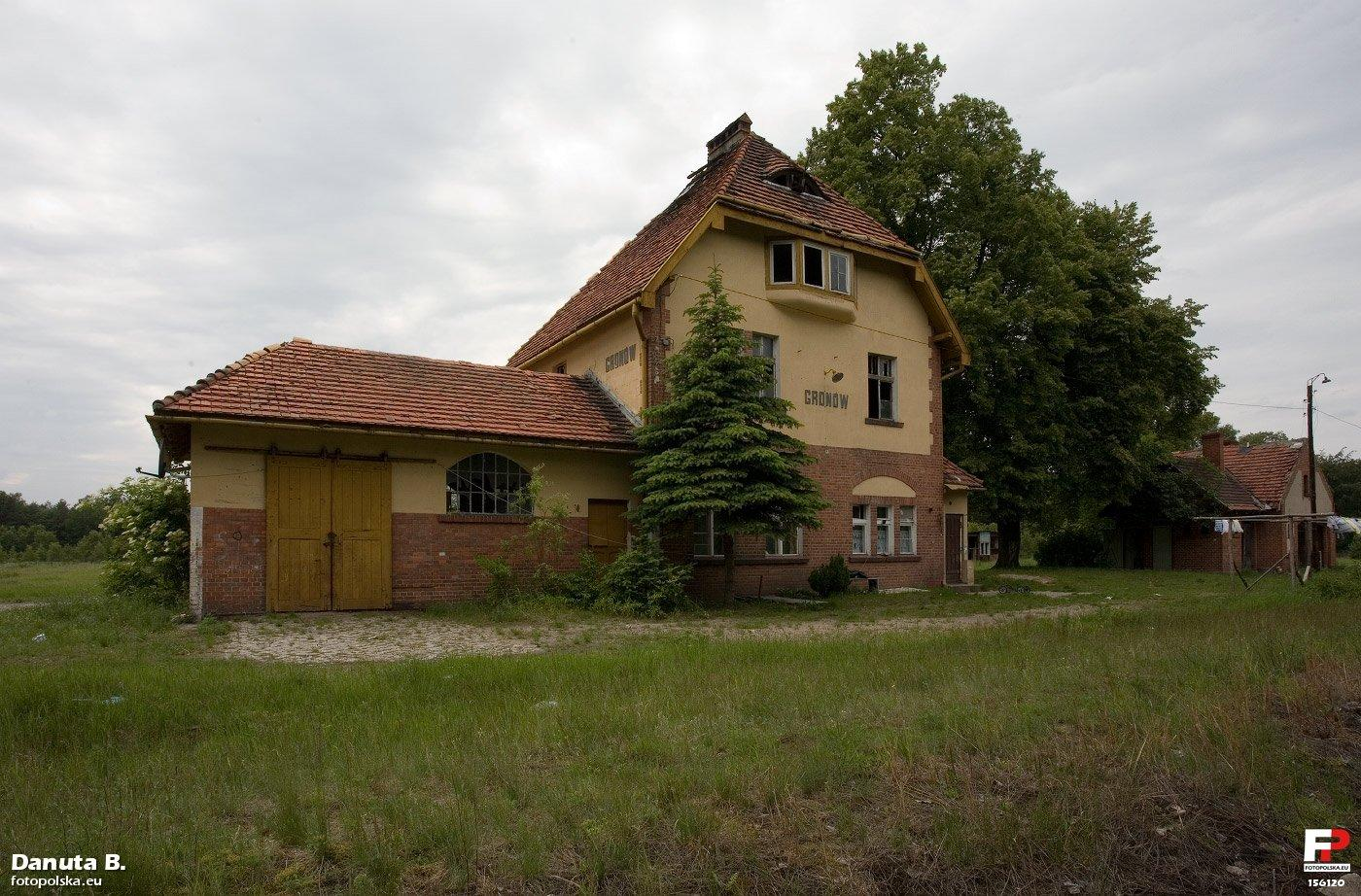
- Railway station

- Location within Poland
- Coordinates: 52°18′11″N 15°18′10″E
- Country: Poland
- Voivodeship: Lubusz
- County: Świebodzin
- Gmina: Łagów

Gronów [ˈɡrɔnuf] is a village in the administrative district of Gmina Łagów, within Świebodzin County, Lubusz Voivodeship, in western Poland.
