= Mniszków, Łódź Voivodeship =

Mniszków
- Village
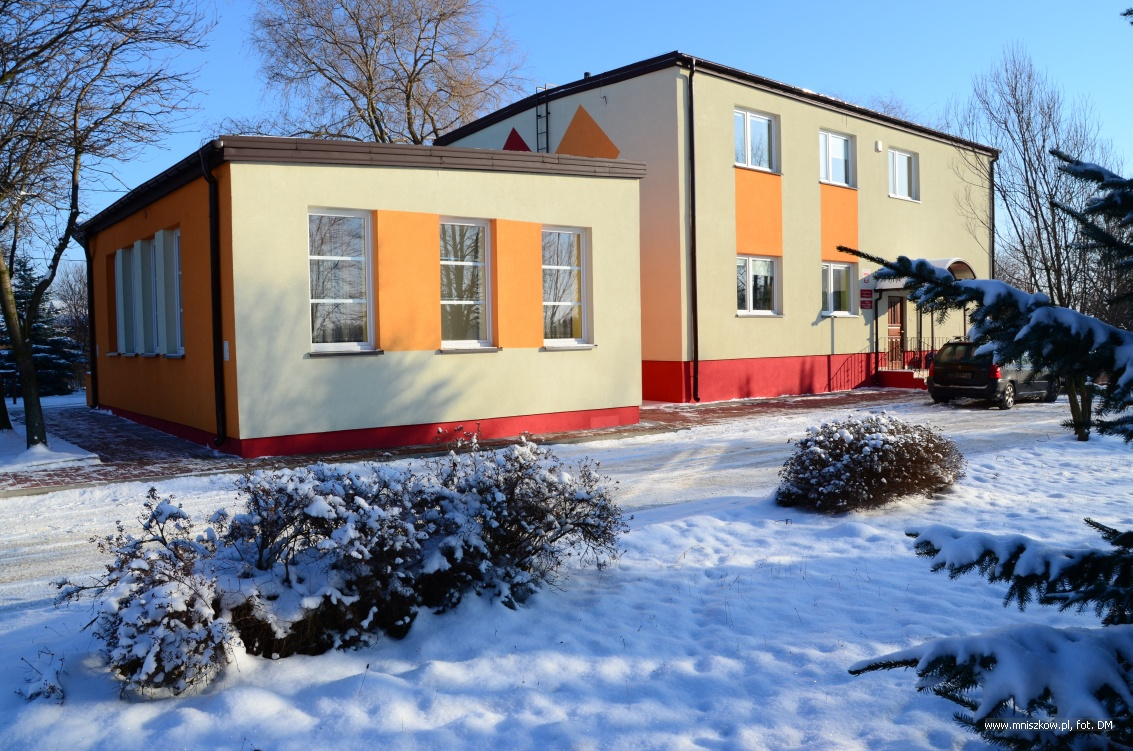
- Gmina office

- Location within Poland
- Coordinates: 51°22′15″N 20°2′3″E
- Country: Poland
- Voivodeship: Łódź
- County: Opoczno
- Gmina: Mniszków
- Population: 525

Mniszków [ˈmniʂkuf] is a village in Opoczno County, Łódź Voivodeship, in central Poland. It is the seat of the gmina (administrative district) called Gmina Mniszków.
