= Stok, Łódź Voivodeship =

Stok
- Village
- Location within Poland
- Coordinates: 51°21′N 20°6′E
- Country: Poland
- Voivodeship: Łódź
- County: Opoczno
- Gmina: Mniszków

Stok [stɔk] is a village in the administrative district of Gmina Mniszków, within Opoczno County, Łódź Voivodeship, in central Poland.
