= Stok, Lubusz Voivodeship =

Stok
- Village
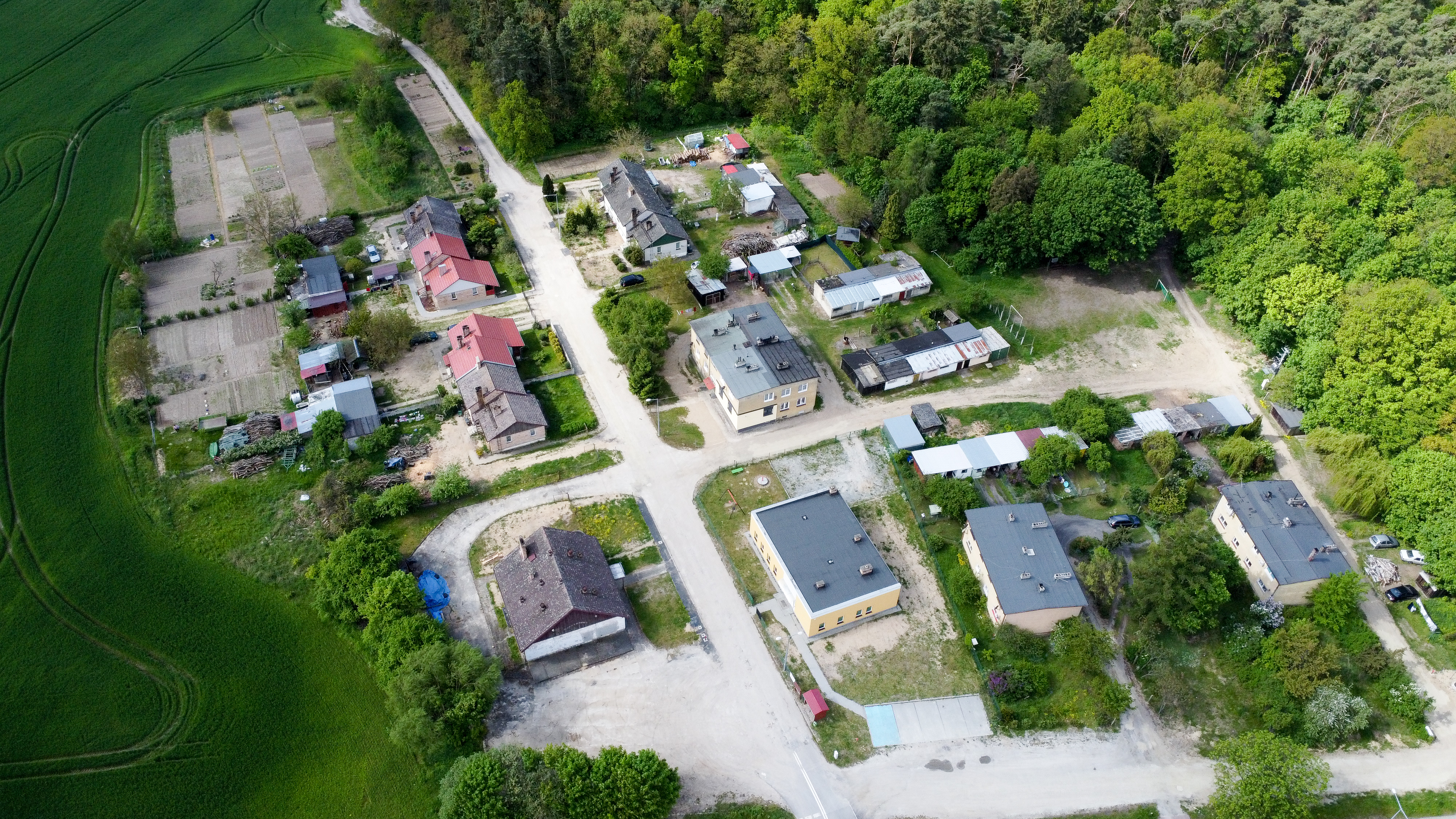
- Stok aerial view

- Location within Poland
- Coordinates: 52°17′46″N 15°18′59″E
- Country: Poland
- Voivodeship: Lubusz
- County: Świebodzin
- Gmina: Łagów

Stok [stɔk] is a village in the administrative district of Gmina Łagów, within Świebodzin County, Lubusz Voivodeship, in western Poland.
