= Gmina Dąbie, Lubusz Voivodeship =

Gmina Dąbie Dąbie Commune
- Gmina
- Coat of arms
- Interactive map of Gmina Dąbie
- Coordinates (Dąbie): 52°1′N 15°9′E
- Country: Poland
- Voivodeship: Lubusz
- County: Krosno
- Seat: Dąbie

Area
  - Total: 170.04 km^{2} (65.65 sq mi)

Population (2019-06-30)
  - Total: 4,930
  - Density: 29.0/km^{2} (75.1/sq mi)
- Website: http://www.dabie.pl/

Gmina Dąbie is a rural gmina (administrative district) in Krosno County, Lubusz Voivodeship, in western Poland. Its seat is the village of Dąbie, which lies approximately 4 kilometres (2 mi) south-east of Krosno Odrzańskie and 26 km (16 mi) west of Zielona Góra.

The gmina covers an area of 170.04 square kilometres (65.7 sq mi), and as of 2019 its total population is 4,930.

== Villages ==
Gmina Dąbie contains the villages and settlements of Brzeźnica, Budynia, Ciemnice, Dąbie, Dąbki, Godziejów, Gola, Gronów, Kosierz, Łagów, Lubiatów, Mokry Młyn, Nowy Zagór, Pław, Połupin, Stary Zagór, Suchy Młyn, Szczawno and Trzebule.

== Neighbouring gminas ==
Gmina Dąbie is bordered by the gminas of Bobrowice, Czerwieńsk, Krosno Odrzańskie, Nowogród Bobrzański and Świdnica.

== Twin towns – sister cities ==
Gmina Dąbie is twinned with:

- Lieberose/Oberspreewald, Germany
