= Gmina Łagów, Lubusz Voivodeship =

Gmina Łagów Łagów Commune
- Gmina
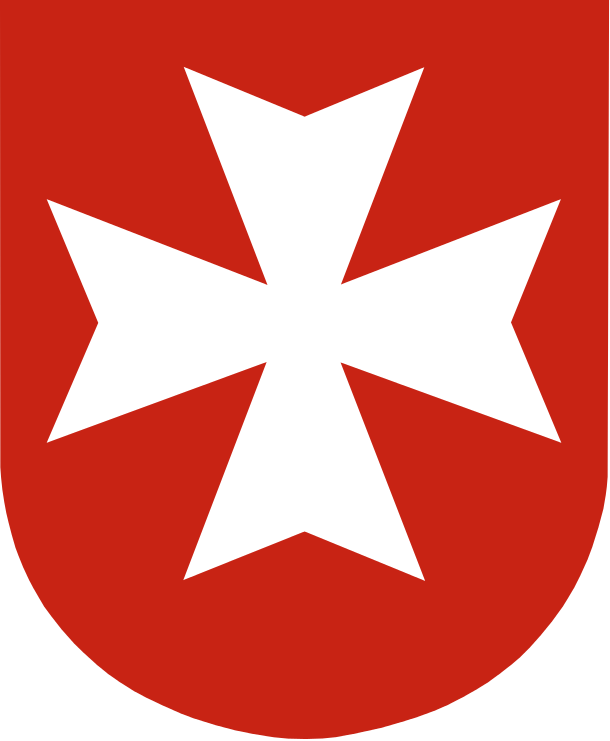
- Flag Coat of arms
- Interactive map of Gmina Łagów
- Coordinates (Łagów): 52°19′57″N 15°17′37″E
- Country: Poland
- Voivodeship: Lubusz
- County: Świebodzin
- Seat: Łagów

Area
  - Total: 199.19 km^{2} (76.91 sq mi)

Population (2019-07-31)
  - Total: 4,981
  - Density: 25.01/km^{2} (64.77/sq mi)
- Website: http://www.lagow.pl

Gmina Łagów is a rural gmina (administrative district) in Świebodzin County, Lubusz Voivodeship, in western Poland. Its seat is the village of Łagów, which lies approximately 19 kilometres (12 mi) north-west of Świebodzin, 45 km (28 mi) south of Gorzów Wielkopolski, and 46 km (29 mi) north of Zielona Góra.

The gmina covers an area of 199.19 square kilometres (76.9 sq mi), and as of 2019 its total population is 4,969.

The gmina contains part of the protected area called Łagów Landscape Park.

== Villages ==
Gmina Łagów contains the villages and settlements of Czyste, Gronów, Jemiołów, Kłodnica, Kolonia Czartów, Kosobudki, Kosobudz, Łagów, Łagówek, Niedźwiedź, Pasałka, Poźrzadło, Sieniawa, Stok, Toporów, Troszki, Zamęt and Żelechów.

== Neighbouring gminas ==
Gmina Łagów is bordered by the gminas of Bytnica, Lubrza, Skąpe, Sulęcin and Torzym.

== Twin towns – sister cities ==
Gmina Łagów is twinned with:

- Buckow, Germany
