= J J Lagowski =

American chemist (died 2014)

- Died: 29 April 2014
- Citizenship: United States
- Education: University of Illinois; University of Michigan; Michigan State University; Cambridge University
- Known for: Discovery of the auride ion
- Scientific career
- Fields: Chemistry
- Workplaces: University of Texas at Austin

Joseph John Lagowski was an American chemist working at The University of Texas at Austin.

Lagowski studied chemistry at the University of Illinois and received bachelor's degree in 1952. Later he studied at the University of Michigan to become Master of Science in 1954. In 1957 he finished graduate studies and received Ph.D. from Michigan State University. Lagowski continued studying in the University of Cambridge in England on a Marshall Scholarship with a title of D.Phil. received in 1959. He was a professor at The University of Texas from 1959 until his retirement in 2008.

His research dealt with non-aqueous solutions and organometallic pi-complexes. In 1978 he published a paper in which he described the strange spectroscopic and electrochemical behaviour of caesium and gold solution in liquid ammonia - pale yellow instead of blue colour was observed. This confirmed the existence of the auride ion Au^{−}, which is a rare example of a single noble metal anion. He was the sixth editor of the Journal of Chemical Education (1979–1996).
