= Łagów, Krosno County =

Łagów
- Village
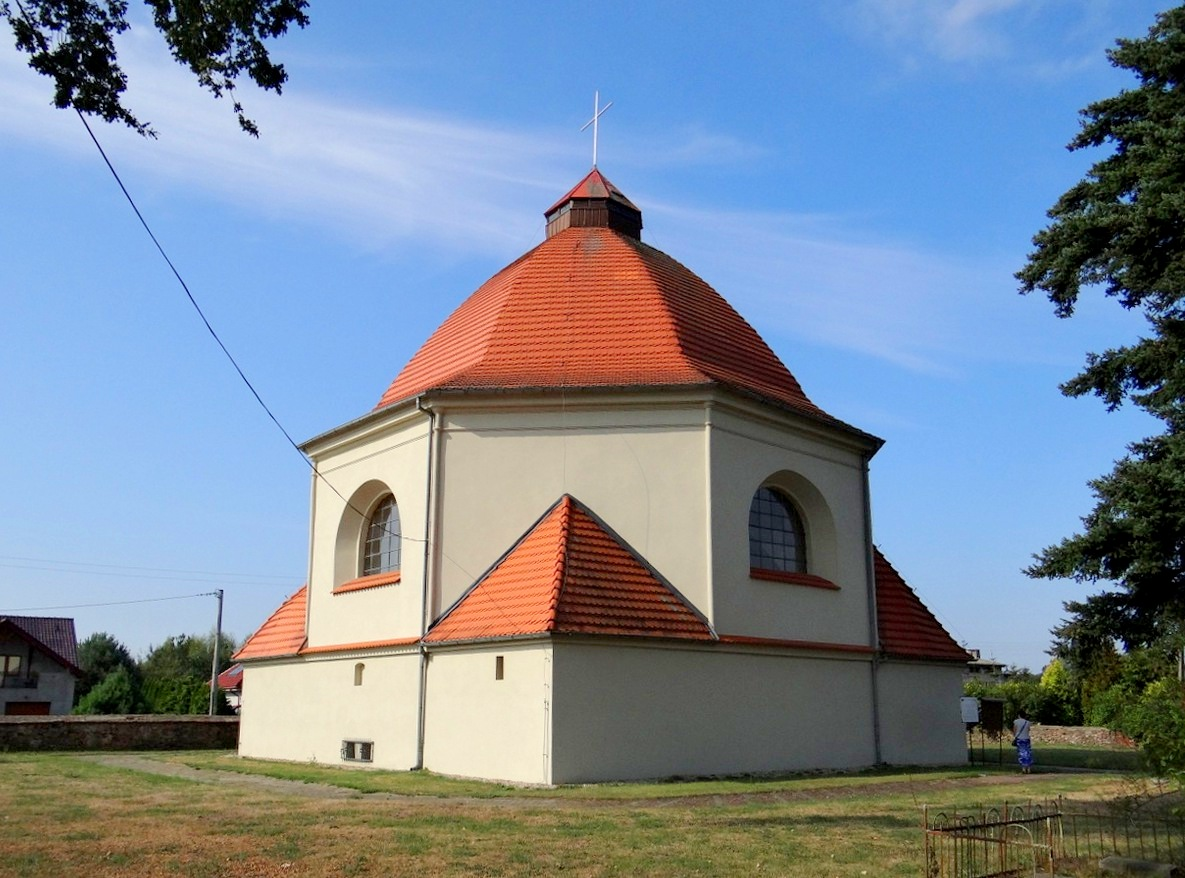
- Catholic church

- Location within Poland
- Coordinates: 51°59′N 15°16′E
- Country: Poland
- Voivodeship: Lubusz
- County: Krosno
- Gmina: Dąbie

Łagów ([ˈwaɡuf]; German: Logau) is a village in the administrative district of Gmina Dąbie, within Krosno County, Lubusz Voivodeship, in western Poland.
