= Świeciechów =

- Village
- Location within Poland
- Coordinates: 51°21′3″N 20°1′52″E
- Country: Poland
- Voivodeship: Łódź
- County: Opoczno
- Gmina: Mniszków

Świeciechów (Polish pronunciation: [ɕfjɛˈt͡ɕɛxuf]) is a village in the administrative district of Gmina Mniszków, within Opoczno County, Łódź Voivodeship, in central Poland.
