= Łagów Landscape Park =

Protected area in Western Poland

Łagów-Sulęcin Landscape Park
- Łagowsko-Sulęciński Park Krajobrazowy
- IUCN category V (protected landscape/seascape)
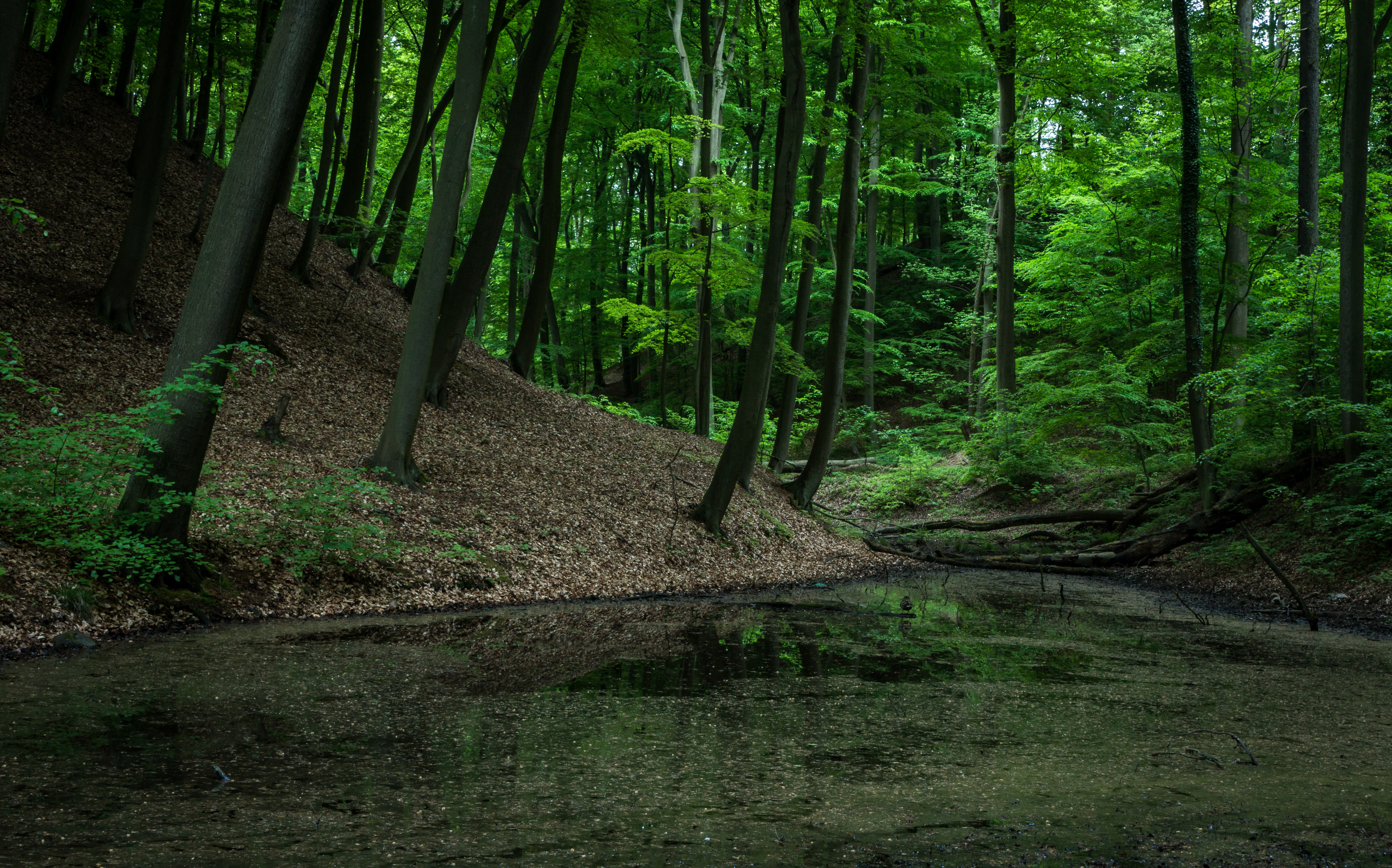
- Nature reserve Nad Jeziorem Trześniowskim
- Interactive map of Łagów-Sulęcin Landscape Park
- Location: Lubusz Voivodeship
- Coordinates: 52°18′30″N 15°16′30″E
- Area: 49.29 km^{2} (19.03 sq mi)
- Established: 1985

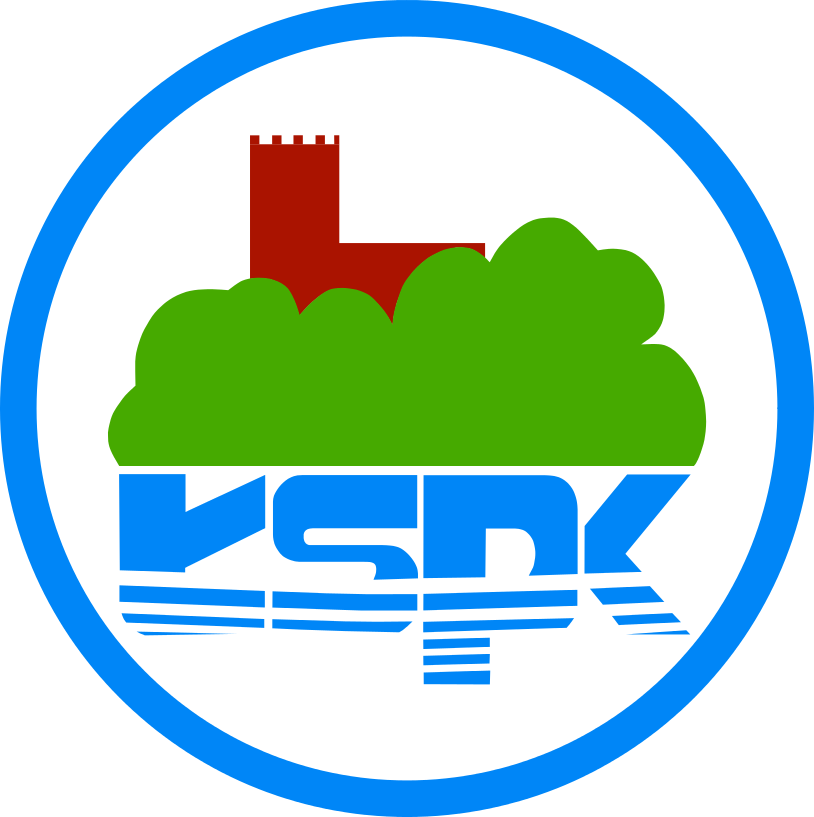
Park logo with Joannit Castle in Łagów

Łagów-Sulęcin Landscape Park (Łagowsko-Sulęciński Park Krajobrazowy) is a protected area (Landscape Park) in western Poland, established in 1985, covering an area of 49.29 square kilometres (19.03 sq mi).

The park lies within Lubusz Voivodeship, in Sulęcin County, (Gmina Sulęcin) and Świebodzin County (Gmina Łagów).

Within the Landscape Park are three nature reserves.
