= 81st Infantry Regiment (Poland) =

Polish infantry unit

81st Grodno Rifles Regiment
- 81 Pułk Strzelców Grodzieńskich
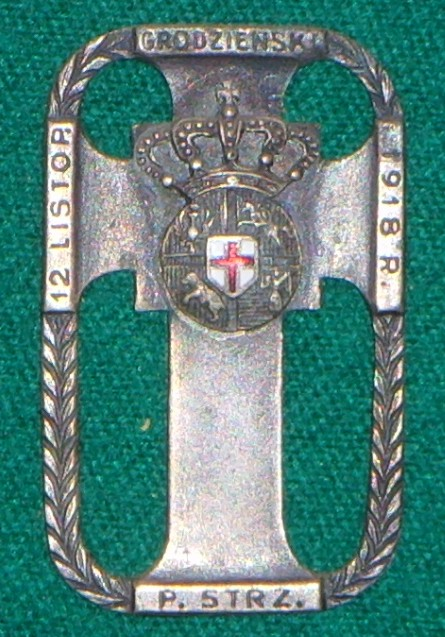
- Badge of the 81st Grodno Rifles Regiment
- Active: November 12, 1918–September 12, 1939
- Country: Poland
- Allegiance: 1st Lithuanian–Belarusian Division; 29th Infantry Division
- Type: infantry
- Garrison/HQ: Grodno Garrison
- Patron: Stephen Báthory
- Anniversaries: November 12
- Engagements: Polish–Soviet War; Battle of the Niemen River; Invasion of Poland; Battle of Piotrków Trybunalski
- Decorations: Virtuti Militari

Commanders
- First commander: Major Jan Jackiewicz
- Last commander: Colonel Edward Banaszak

The King Stephen Báthory 81st Grodno Rifle Regiment (Polish: 81 Pułk Strzelców Grodzieńskich im. Króla Stefana Batorego, abbreviated as 81 pp) was an infantry unit of the Self-Defence of Lithuania and Belarus and the Polish Armed Forces.

The regiment traces its origins to the military formations of the Grodno Land Self-Defense, established on 12 November 1918. During the 1920 war, as the Grodno Rifle Regiment, it was part of the 1st Lithuanian–Belarusian Division. It fought against Soviet and Lithuanian forces, including at Stolovichy, Bobruisk, in the Republic of Central Lithuania, and participated in the Battle of Warsaw and the defense of Suwałki. After the reorganization of the Polish Armed Forces, it joined the 29th Infantry Division. Before 1939, it was stationed in the Grodno Garrison.

In the September Campaign of 1939, the regiment fought within its parent division as part of the reserve Prussian Army. Due to command errors, it operated detached from the main forces. Its combat path ran from Bartkowice Mokre forest through Trzebiatów, Brzuza, Wólka Kuligowska, and Kraszków to Przysucha forest, where, on 12 September, it was overwhelmed and destroyed by superior enemy forces.

== In the Grodno Land Self-Defense ==
The regiment's founding date is considered 12 November 1918, when the Grodno Land Self-Defense was established. Volunteers began joining the newly formed regiment from 14 command posts around Grodno. Officers were recruited from the former Russian army and the Eastern Corps, while enlisted men were exclusively volunteers from the Grodno region.

Uniforms consisted of both German and Russian attire, with some soldiers wearing civilian clothes. The distinguishing mark of Grodno units was a white-and-red armband bearing the seal of the Regency Council. Initial armament – 500 rifles with ammunition – was obtained from the Germans under an agreement with the Ober-Ost command.

Shortages in arms and equipment, coupled with German reluctance, forced Polish authorities to send some volunteers to Łapy. The unit's total strength reached 700 soldiers, including 30 cavalrymen, and was named the 1st Grodno Rifle Regiment. Major Jan Jackiewicz was appointed commander, with Major Bronisław Bohaterewicz leading the 1st Battalion.

By 10 January 1919, the formed and trained subunits were concentrated in Kapciouka. Major Bohaterewicz divided the 1st Battalion into three companies: 1st under Second Lieutenant Oreluk, 2nd under Second Lieutenant Romanowski, and 3rd under Second Lieutenant Piotr Daniszewski. A cavalry detachment under Lieutenant Czuczełowicz and a supply unit were also formed.

The unit's rapid growth alarmed the Germans, who decided to disarm the battalion in Kapciouka. On the night of 15–16 January 1919, German infantry surrounded the barracks. After arresting Polish negotiators, they forced the Grodno rifles to partially disperse and disarm. Only Lieutenant Czuczełowicz's cavalry escaped encirclement. On 23 January, Major Jackiewicz was arrested.

Some subunits regrouped near Grodno, where Major Bohaterewicz took command and reconstituted the 1st Battalion under Captain Waśkiewicz. On 4 February 1919, this battalion swore a solemn oath. Colonel Adam Dulewicz was appointed the new commander of the Grodno Land Self-Defense and negotiated a new agreement with the Germans, relocating the regiment to Krynki.

== Within the 1st Lithuanian–Belarusian Division ==
The next phase of reorganization began with an order from General Wacław Iwaszkiewicz-Rudoszański to establish the staff of the Grodno Rifle Regiment within the 1st Lithuanian–Belarusian Division. Colonel Franciszek Ostrowski organized it in Vawkavysk at the division's reserve center, with Lieutenant Colonel Stanisław Kowalski as deputy commander and Lieutenant Jerzy Dąbrowski as adjutant. The self-defense regiment was to become a fully-fledged unit of the reviving Polish Armed Forces.

The first subunit to join the division was Lieutenant Czuczełowicz's half-squadron of Grodno Uhlans, comprising three officers and 52 cavalrymen. On 7 March, Major Bohaterewicz brought the self-defense infantry to Vawkavysk, transferring command to Colonel Ostrowski. At this point, the regiment numbered 17 officers and 250 enlisted men. The 1st Battalion of the Grodno Rifle Regiment was formed under Major Bohaterewicz, alongside a non-commissioned officer school led by Captain Waśkiewicz.

The 2nd Battalion was established by late May from the division's reserve battalion in Vawkavysk. Like the 1st Battalion, it consisted entirely of volunteers from the borderlands. The 3rd Battalion was formed last, joining the regiment in June 1920. It was created from the reserve battalion of the 12th Infantry Regiment from Wadowice. According to Janusz Odziemkowski, the 3rd Battalion was originally the Mobile Mounted Rifle Detachment of Second Lieutenant Stefan Felsztyński, which relinquished its horses and reformed into two infantry companies.

In December 1919, the regiment's reserve battalion was stationed in Baranavichy.

== In the fight for borders ==
=== In the Polish-Bolshevik War ===
==== 1919 campaign ====
The first subunit of the Grodno Regiment to engage in combat was the half-squadron of Grodno Uhlans under Lieutenant Stanisław Czuczełowicz, tasked with reconnaissance duties. On the night of 9–10 March 1919, this unit participated in an operation to expel Soviet forces that had temporarily occupied Slonim.

On 19 March 1919, the Grodno Rifle Regiment arrived in Slonim by transport, beginning its frontline service. It occupied a sector along the Shchara river from Mironim to Żyrowice. While conducting patrols, the regiment trained and reinforced its ranks.

In the operation to capture Vilnius, the regiment operated within Colonel Aleksander Boruszczak's group, tasked first with seizing Baranavichy. The battle for Baranavichy began on 15 April. Unable to take the town directly, on 17 April, a "northern group" was formed under Colonel Ostrowski to outflank Stolovichy from the north and strike the Soviet northern flank. This group included the Grodno Regiment (minus its 1st Company), the 3rd and 6th Companies of the Białystok Regiment, the 8th People's Militia Battalion, and a section of the 7th Field Artillery Regiment. On 19 April, after a day-long battle with the Soviet 4th Revolutionary Warsaw Rifle Regiment, the Grodno Regiment captured Stolovichy, suffering three killed and seven wounded, capturing 40 prisoners, and seizing four machine guns, seven horses, and significant amounts of ammunition and equipment. The action at Stolovichy is considered the regiment's baptism of fire as a cohesive fighting unit.

On 4 November, subunits of the regiment participated in the battle for Lyepyel, capturing it and successfully defending it against attacks by the Soviet 52nd Rifle Division. The regiment lost over 20% of its personnel in these engagements, with some companies reduced to about 40 men. During the winter, the regiment was reorganized: the 3rd Battalion was disbanded, and its personnel were used to reinforce the remaining subunits. The monotony of the winter campaign was broken by frequent raids on enemy positions.

=== In Żeligowski's group in the Republic of Central Lithuania ===
Still part of the 1st Lithuanian–Belarusian Division, the regiment participated in Żeligowski's Mutiny. On 7 October 1920, it began its march "on Vilnius". Leading the 2nd Brigade, it advanced toward Wielka Czernica–Kudonino, capturing Ogrodniki in a direct assault. After seizing Vilnius, it secured the city from the north.

=== Combat summary ===
From 1918 to 1920, 196 officers and enlisted men were killed in combat. Additionally, 90 died on the front. Numerical records indicate losses of 260 killed, about 800 wounded, and approximately 300 missing.

Soldiers of the regiment killed and died of wounds in the Polish-Bolshevik War
Officers
Second Lieutenant Bckker	Lieutenant Borkiewicz, Józef	Lieutenant Bortkiewicz, Franciszek Michał
Cadet Ewiak, Michał	Second Lieutenant Kuś, Wojciech	Second Lieutenant Łuszczyliski-Trojekurew, Cyryl
Second Lieutenant Milewski, Eustachy	Lieutenant Oreluk, Feliks	Lieutenant Rybek, Józef
Second Lieutenant Romaszewski, Seweryn S.G.	Second Lieutenant Sirotkiewicz, Piotr	Second Lieutenant Sobieszczański, Stanisław
Second Lieutenant Count Soltan, Stanisław	Second Lieutenant Tarnowski, Józef	Second Lieutenant Wilga, Wiktor
Cadet Żłobikowski, Stanisław		
Enlisted men
Sergeant Amorek	Private Barczewski, Jau	Private Boguszko, Romuald
Private Bryś, Franciszek	Private Buta, Teofil	Private Chojnacki, Ignacy
Private Chora, Stefan	Private Choncer, Józef	Sergeant Chłosta, Stefan
Private Cimosz, Bronisław	Private Czopek, Antoni	Private Czajkowski, Jan
Private Czermaliński, Józef	Private Czercszkicwicz, Ludwik	Corporal Cylwik, Jan
Private Cyilzik, Jan	Corporal Danilowicz, Jan	Private Dłubak, Antoni
Private Drewieukow, Paweł	Sergeant Dubas, Adolf	Sergeant Duda, Florjan
Master Sergeant Dudwał, Władysław	Private Dugowski, Józef	Private Działek, Piotr
Sergeant Dzierzęcki, Eugeniusz	Private Dziuba, Kazimierz	Master Sergeant Dziurdź, Stanisław
Private Fabisiak, Józef	Private Fabjańczyk, Władysław	Private Filiński, Józef
Private Gietsh	Sergeant Gliński, Edmund	Private Grula, Stefan
Private Grędziński, Franciszek	Private Grygier, Antoni	Private Grzewa, Paweł
Private Haładyu, Antoni	Corporal Hajduk, Aleksander	Lance Corporal Hauk, Józef
Private Hurek, Stanisław	Lance Corporal Hakowicz-Naczko, Karol	Private Indyk, Stanisław
Private Irlacli, Kazimierz	Private Jankiewicz, Władysław	Sergeant Jabłoński, Stanisław
Private Jadurski, Bolesław	Lance Corporal Jakubik, Władysław	Private Jiulyk, Jan
Private Jurkiewicz, Stefan	Corporal Kalinowski, Bolesław	Corporal Kupisz, Jan
Private Karaś, Józef	Lance Corporal Kasprzycki, Stanisław	Private Kiedel, Florjan
Private Kmin, Tomasz	Private Kopyś, Jan	Private Kościński, Aleksander
Master Sergeant Kosiorowski, Józef	Corporal Kowalczyk, Stanisław	Private Kowalczyk, Bronisław
Private Kowalski, Jan	Private Kosko	Lance Corporal Krawczyk, Henryk
Private Kratter, Berthold	Private Królikowski, Walenty	Private Krygier, Antoni
Private Krysiuk, Jerzy	Private Krywienia, Michał	Corporal Kulak, Teodor
Private Kułakowski, Jan	Private Kucaj, Jan	Private Kurek, Józef
Sergeant Langner, Józef	Private Łączyński, Leon	Private Leeli, Marcin
Lance Corporal Lewczuk	Private Luczno, Antoni	Private Lus, Reinhold
Private Łobza, Jan	Private Łoziński, Piotr	Private Łukaszczuk, Józef
Private Macek, Jan	Private Madziński, Zygmunt	Private Maron, Rudolf
Medic Marcinkowski, Józef	Sergeant Marek	Private Matusiewicz, Tadeusz
Private Mazurowski, Franciszek	Private Mendak, Józef	Private Migowski, Franciszek
Private Miklasz, Jan	Private Mikołajczyk, Jan	Private Miltko, Jan
Private Mikoń, Stanisław	Private Milewski, Andrzej	Private Moroz, Jan
Private Mozolewski, Józef	Lance Corporal Mroczkowski, Dominik	Private Musiał, Antoni
Private Narbut, Szymon	Private Niedźwiecki, Kazimierz	Private Nowodworski, Kazimierz
Private Obus	Lance Corporal Olesiuk, Aleksander	Private Ostrower, Henryk
Private Ostrowski, Kazimierz	Private Owczarek, Władysław	Private Pakulski, Franciszek
Private Palmowicz, Kazimierz	Private Petelczyc, Antoni	Private Pbcli, Antoni
Private Poletczyn, Antoni	Private Popiciuk, Jan	Private Porzecki, Józef
Private Pobjańczyk, Władysław	Private Protasiewicz, Jan	Private Przenica, Szmul
Private Przepiórski, Józef	Corporal Purkiewicz, Piotr	Private Radosz, Andrzej
Lance Corporal Rank, Józef	Private Rudkowski, Witalis	Private Rakowski, Bronisław
Private Rudolf, Franciszek	Private Ruszkowski, Kazimierz	Lance Corporal Sadlej, Grzegorz
Sergeant Salomonowicz, Kazimierz	Private Scrafinowicz, Władysław	Sergeant Selczek
Private Siedant, Franciszek	Sergeant Skibel, Bronisław	Private Skóra, Józef
Lance Corporal Skrzypek, Jan	Private Skuza, Jan	Private Skuza, Józef
Private Śliwiński, Władysław	Private Śluzek, Stanisław	Private Sobocki, Wawrzyniec
Private Soboń, Walenty	Private Socliowski	Lance Corporal Sołonowiez, Kazimierz
Private Sobiecki, Jan	Private Sommerfeld, August	Private Sosnowski, Wacław
Private Średnicki, Ignacy	Master Sergeant Srzednicki, Ignacy	Private Stasiak, Antoni
Private Stefaniak, Józef	Private Stodolik, Jan	Private Stwolowicz
Lance Corporal Suclich, Grzegorz	Private Szczeszkiewicz, Ludwik	Private Szkura
Private Szmatlik, Jan	Private Sztukowski, Władysław	Private Szulklaper, Berek
Corporal Szustar, Rudolf	Private Szydłowski, Stanisław	Private Szymański, Józef
Private Szymczak, Józef	Private Tomczyński, Leon	Private Trojanowski, Jan
Private Turosz, Franciszek	Private Walter, Alfons	Lance Corporal Wąsowski, Wincenty
Private Wlazło, Władysław	Private Wojciechowski, Walenty	Master Sergeant Wojkszner, Bolesław
Master Sergeant Woyniłowicz, Stefan	Private Wróbel, Józef	Sergeant Włodarczyk, Antoni
Private Wysocki, Roman	Private Zając, Antoni	Private Zając, Leon
Private Zając, Stanisław	Private Zajczykow, Władysław	Lance Corporal Zaniewski, Józef
Private Zawada, Wojciech	Private Ziarko, Jan	Private Zieliński

=== Recipients of the Virtuti Militari ===
Soldiers of the regiment awarded the Silver Cross of the Military Order Virtuti Militari for the 1918–1921 war (Note: A single asterisk (*) denotes soldiers awarded by Supreme Commander's Decrees L. 2693 and L. 2694 of 15 March 1921 (Dziennik Personalny, pp. 537–538, No. 12 of 26 March 1921). Two asterisks (**) denote those whose awards were announced on 18 February 1922 (Dziennik Personalny, pp. 109–110, No. 2 of 18 February 1922).)
Gold Cross	Lieutenant Colonel Kazimierz Rybicki	
Silver Cross
Regimental Colors	Private Jan Badziński*	Sergeant Roman Benisz*
Lieutenant Colonel Bronisław Bohaterewicz*	Late Lieutenant Józef Borkiewicz** No. 4922	Lieutenant Witold Ciechanowicz*
Second Lieutenant Piotr Daniszewski** No. 4040	Second Lieutenant Jan Domoracki** No. 4191	Lance Corporal Franciszek Gniłka (Gniłko)** No. 3753
Lance Corporal Józef Ilkiewicz*	Major Mieczysław Kaleński-Jaśkiewicz** No. 4126	Corporal Kazimierz Kalicki** No. 4114
Sergeant Józef Kisiel** No. 4034	Sergeant Witold (Wiktor) Komko*	Corporal Józef Kosiorowski
Corporal Zygmunt Kubacki** No. 3758	Second Lieutenant Wacław Kuferski** No. 4071	Sergeant Stanisław Naprawski** No. 4053
Second Lieutenant Feliks Oreluk** No. 4920	Second Lieutenant Piotr Pełka** No. 3754	Second Lieutenant Konstanty Piotrowicz (Pietrowicz)** No. 4058
Sergeant Hieronim Puciłowski** No. 4055	Sergeant Jan Redel** No. 4187	Second Lieutenant Edward Romanowski
Lieutenant Colonel Kazimierz Rybicki*	Lieutenant Colonel General Staff Seweryn Rymaszewski	Sergeant Józef Siedlikowski*
Second Lieutenant Piotr Sirotkiewicz** No. 4921	Corporal Jan Ślusarz** No. 3751	Second Lieutenant Stanisław Sobieszczański*
Lieutenant Franciszek Songin*	Master Sergeant Antoni Symonowicz*	Lieutenant Wacław Szymański** No. 4138
Lieutenant Colonel Bolesław Waśkiewicz*	Sergeant Roman Weber*	Sergeant Władysław Węglarz** No. 4181
Lance Corporal Mieczysław Wojciechowski* No. 2278	Corporal Bolesław Wojkszner** No. 4059	Sergeant Aleksander Zarecz** No. 4093
Sergeant Albin Zuwalski** No. 4135	Corporal Edward Żemajtis* No. 368	

For bravery in combat, the regimental colors and 40 soldiers were awarded the Silver Cross of the Virtuti Militari, while 170 received the Cross of Valour. 96 soldiers were decorated with the Cross of Merit of the Central Lithuanian Army.

== Regiment in peacetime ==
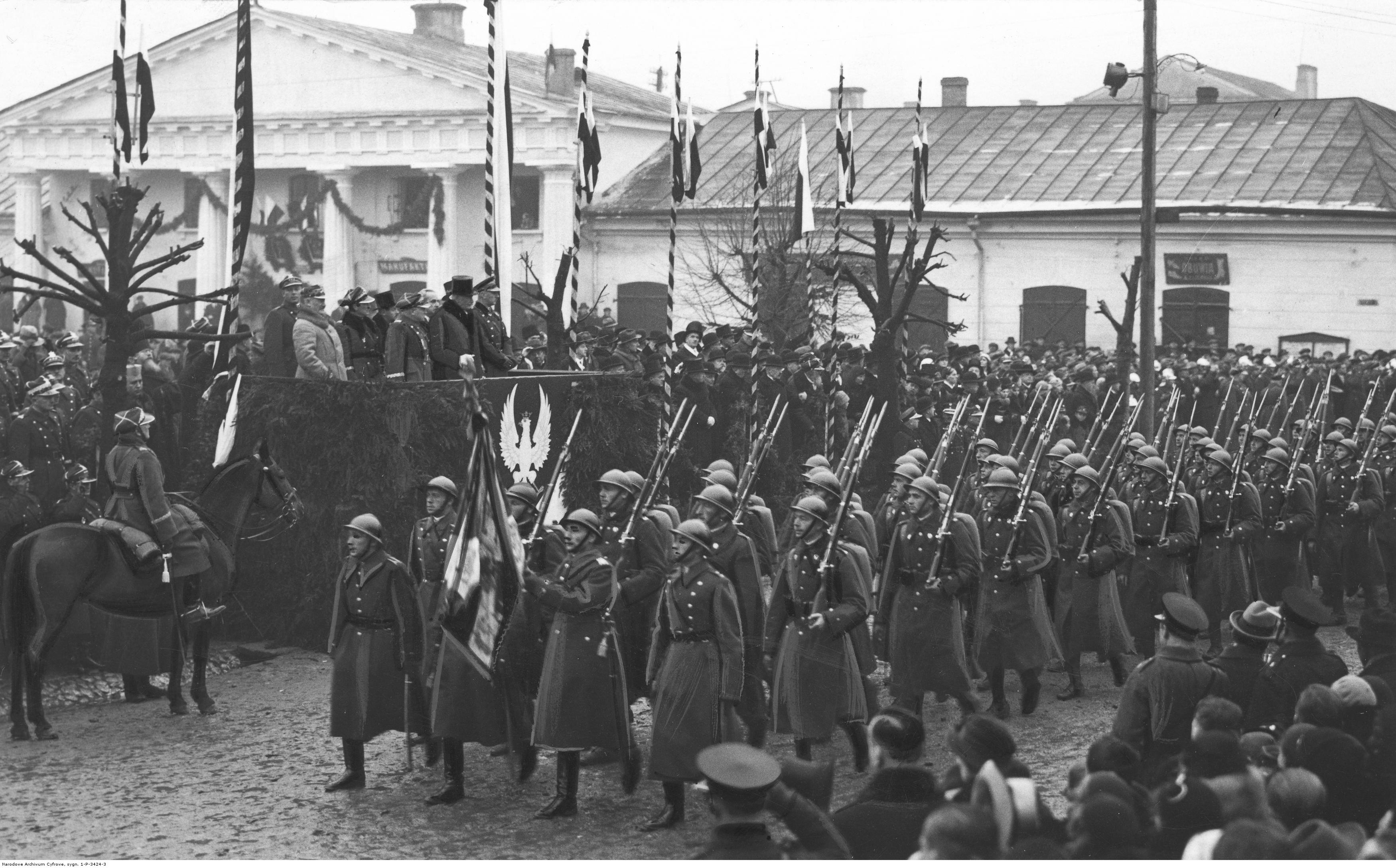
Celebration of the 400th anniversary of King Stephen Báthory's birth in Grodno – the 81st Regiment parades. President of Poland Ignacy Mościcki on the reviewing stand

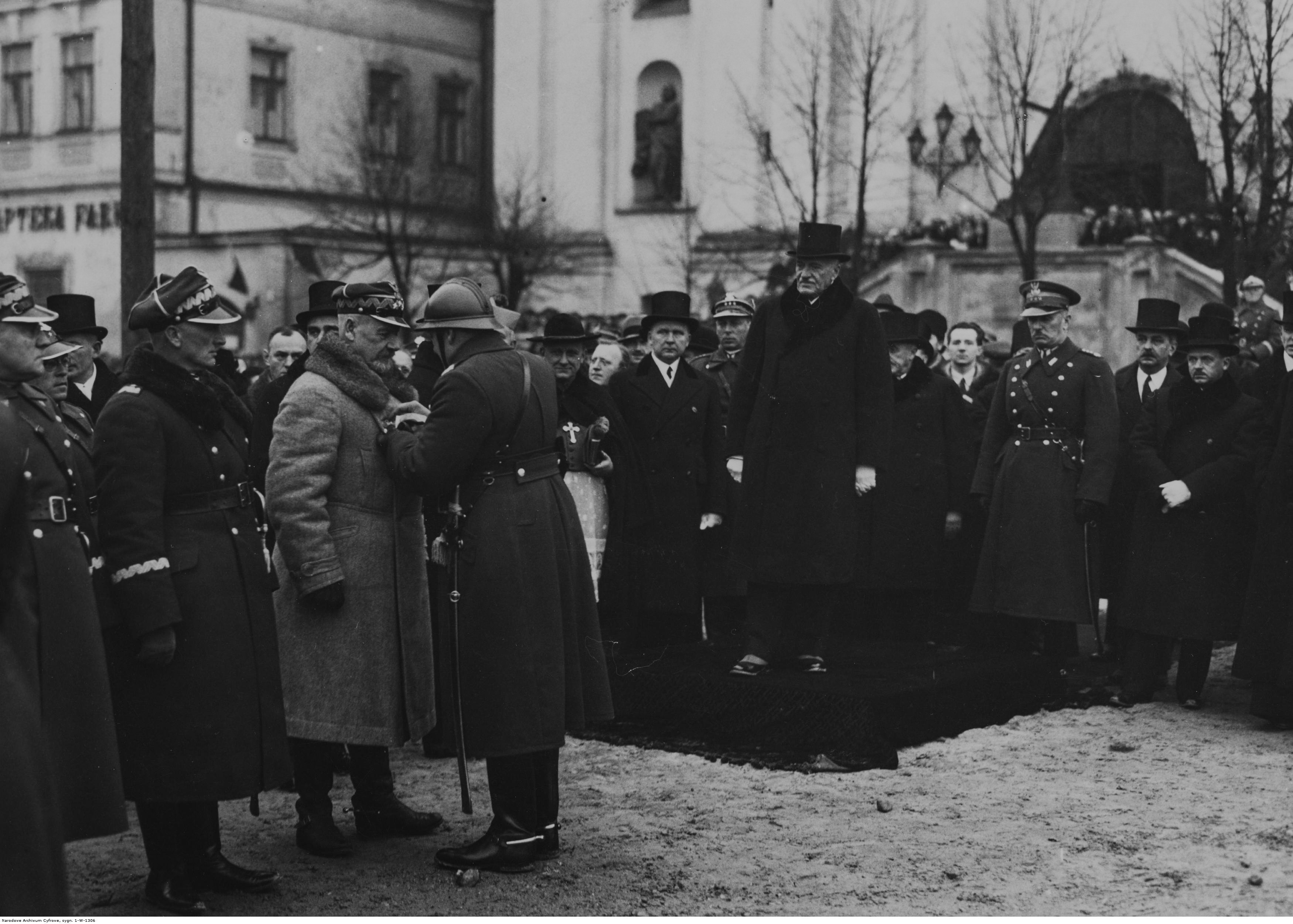
15th anniversary of the 81st Regiment in Grodno – the regiment commander decorates General Lucjan Żeligowski with the badge

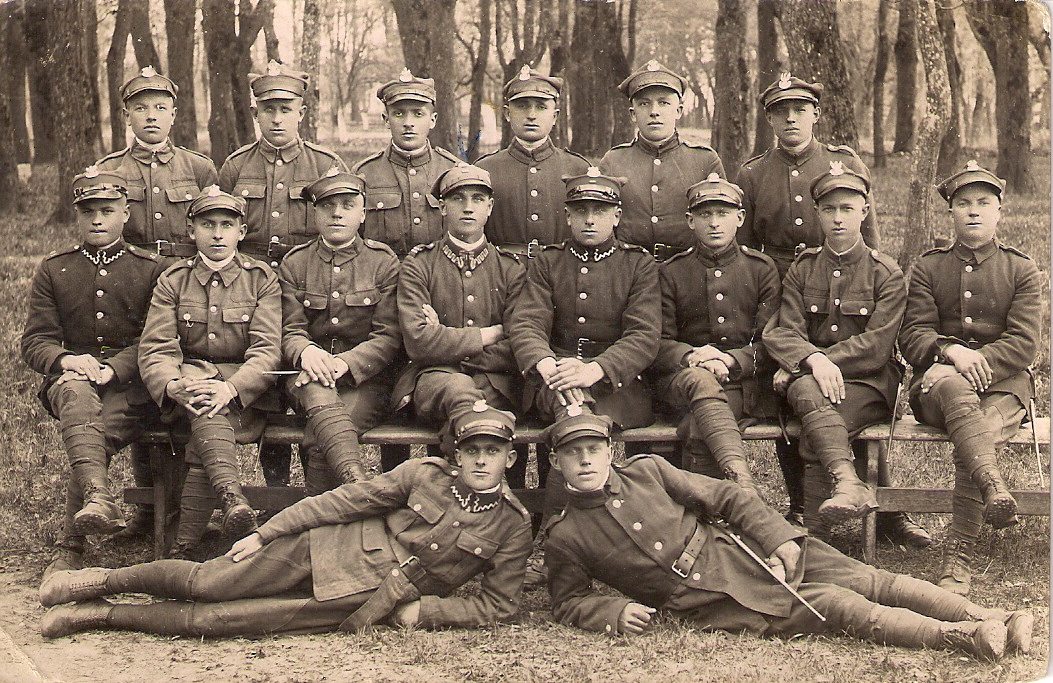
Soldiers of the 81st Regiment

From 1923 to 1939, the regiment was stationed in Grodno, within the III Corps District.

Under the 1930 peacetime infantry organization (PS 10-50), the Polish Armed Forces classified infantry regiments into three types. The 81st Regiment was designated a Type II (reinforced) regiment. It received about 845 recruits annually, with a peacetime strength of 68 officers and 1,900 non-commissioned officers and enlisted men. It was slated for the first mobilization wave in wartime. In winter, it had two battalions of older recruits and a training battalion; in summer, three rifle battalions. Its strength exceeded that of a "normal" (Type I) regiment by 400–700 soldiers. A machine gun company was also added, increasing its strength by 4 officers, 13 non-commissioned officers, 1,200 enlisted men, and 12 machine guns.

The regiment experimentally established a reserve officer cadet company, comprising three rifle platoons and a machine gun platoon. This company reported to the division commander for organization and training and to the regiment commander for administration.

Personnel and organizational structure in March 1939 (Note: The list reflects the unit's personnel immediately before the mobilization of the first Polish Armed Forces units on 23 March 1939, after the last promotions announced on 19 March 1939 (Rybka & Stepan (2006, p. 6)).)
Position	Rank, name
Command, quartermaster, and special subunits
Regiment Commander	Colonel Edward Banaszak
First Deputy Commander	Lieutenant Colonel Diplomat Zygmunt Cetnerowski
Adjutant	Major Seweryn Karol Byszek
Senior Physician	Captain Doctor Konrad Jurowski
Junior Physician	Vacant
Second Deputy Commander (Quartermaster)	Lieutenant Colonel Stefan Mrozek
Mobilization Officer	Captain Marian Zywert
Deputy Mobilization Officer	Captain Bolesław Tworogal
Administrative-Material Officer	Captain Czesław Polikarp Kalinowski
Economic Officer	Captain Intendant Aleksander Czarnocki
Food Officer	Vacant
Transport Officer	Kazimierz II Chojnowski
Bandmaster	Captain Administrator (Bandmaster) Tomasz Radziszewski
Communications Platoon Commander	Lieutenant Wacław Eustachiusz Bareja
Pioneer Platoon Commander	Lieutenant Jan Kamiński
Infantry Artillery Platoon Commander	Captain Artillery Gustaw Bolesław Różycki
Anti-Tank Platoon Commander	Lieutenant Władysław Szłyk
Reconnaissance Detachment Commander	Lieutenant Stanisław I Kałużny
1st Battalion
Battalion Commander	Major Piotr Marciniak
1st Company Commander	Captain Józef Ujazdowski
Platoon Commander	Lieutenant Mieczysław Sokolnicki
Platoon Commander	Second Lieutenant Edward Sobczyk
2nd Company Commander	Lieutenant Marian Widzowski
Platoon Commander	Second Lieutenant Władysław Silarski
Platoon Commander	Second Lieutenant Antoni Aleksander Bednarczyk
3rd Company Commander	Acting Lieutenant Zygmunt Józef Bieńkowski
Platoon Commander	Second Lieutenant Jan Borgula
1st Machine Gun Company Commander	Lieutenant Edward Laszuk
Platoon Commander	Lieutenant Czesław Pietrewicz
2nd Battalion
Battalion Commander	Major Wacław Ptaszyński
4th Company Commander	Captain Czesław Kazimierz Michalczyk
Platoon Commander	Lieutenant Jerzy Kopczyński
Platoon Commander	Second Lieutenant Michał Wawrzyniec Kosiba
5th Company Commander	Captain Józef Julian Zatopiański
Platoon Commander	Second Lieutenant Kazimierz Zając
Platoon Commander	Second Lieutenant Roman Jerzy Fiedorowicz
6th Company Commander	Captain Lucjan Marceli Zalewski
Platoon Commander	Second Lieutenant Teodor Kowalczyk
2nd Machine Gun Company Commander	Captain Konrad Leopold Stępień
Platoon Commander	Second Lieutenant Mikołaj Witold Drozdowicz
3rd Battalion
Battalion Commander	Vacant
7th Company Commander	Lieutenant Władysław Żogło
Platoon Commander	Second Lieutenant Piotr Nowiński
8th Company Commander	Lieutenant Stanisław Józef Sokołowski
Platoon Commander	Lieutenant Józef Jan Storc
9th Company Commander	Lieutenant Włodzimierz Dulniak
Platoon Commander	Second Lieutenant Hubert Karol Kobarski
Platoon Commander	Second Lieutenant Witold Marian Nowakowski
3rd Machine Gun Company Commander	Captain Mieczysław Michał Ciesiuński
Platoon Commander	Second Lieutenant Franciszek Antoni Beck
On Course	Lieutenant Franciszek Zwaniecki
On Course	Lieutenant Antoni Henryk Barański
On Course	Second Lieutenant Ryszard Czesław Dergiman
On Course	Second Lieutenant Rajmund Kiwacz
81st Military Training Circuit (Grodno at 81st Regiment)
Circuit Training Commander	Major Infantry Bolesław Szajda (Note: Bolesław Szajda (b. 8 March 1898) was awarded the Virtuti Militari, three Crosses of Valor, and the Cross with Swords. He was promoted to major with seniority from 19 March 1939, ranked 2nd in the infantry officer corps (Rybka & Stepan (2006, p. 32)).)
Grodno City Training Commander	Lieutenant Contractor Infantry Florian Synakiewicz
Sokółka County Training Commander	Captain Infantry Alfred Andrzej Willich

== Defensive war of 1939 ==
In September 1939, the regiment fought within its parent division in the reserve Prussian Army.

Initially, the division was planned for the main defensive effort under Łódź Army. However, in the summer of 1939, Marshal Edward Rydz-Śmigły reassigned the 29th Division to General Stefan Dąb-Biernacki's Prussian Army.

=== Combat operations ===
On 1 September, the regiment's subunits were in their designated staging areas. In the evening, the commander received orders to redeploy to Spała. The regiment marched overnight, reaching the area by the morning of 2 September and resting in the surrounding forests.

At noon, the 29th Division commander ordered another redeployment. The regiment completed a 28-kilometer daytime march to the Potok forest, remaining there until the evening of 3 September. That night, it marched 10 kilometers to occupy Dąbrowy, Józefowa, and Jaksonek.

On 4 September, officers and enlisted men surrendered their identity documents and Virtuti Militari certificates, which were sent to division headquarters. The first food supply issues, particularly bread shortages, were noted.

That day, the regiment first encountered signs of war, observing the Luftwaffe bombing of Sulejów. It also encountered stray soldiers from various units unable to justify their separation. Contact was established with the adjacent 76th Regiment.

In the afternoon, on army commander's orders, the 81st Regiment dispatched a cyclist squad from its reconnaissance company, led by Second Lieutenant Kazimierz Rzęśny with two machine guns and an anti-tank gun, to support Captain Sopoćko's 5th Company of the 76th Regiment. Tasked with securing a Pilica crossing at Przedbórz, 30 kilometers from the 81st Regiment's position, this detachment never returned.

On 5 September, around 6:00 PM, General Stefan Dąb-Biernacki personally arrived at the 81st Regiment's position and, in Colonel Ignacy Oziewicz's presence, issued an oral order for the regiment to occupy the Łodyńsko–Rozprza–Jeżów sector on the 29th Division's left flank, marching via Jaksonek–Łęczno to Rozprza.

To maintain pace, the regiment began a secured march without wagons around 8:00 PM. The 1st Battalion under Captain Marciniak, reinforced with anti-tank weapons, led as the vanguard, followed by the other battalions, with the reconnaissance company as rearguard. It reached the Pilica crossings near Kurnędz after dark. The ford was shallow but muddy, with steep banks difficult for the few ammunition carts. As the crossing took longer than planned, Colonel Banaszak ordered the vanguard and part of the main column to proceed to the designated area after crossing.

Overnight, the 29th Division's operations officer, Lieutenant Chomiuk, delivered an oral order to change the march direction to the Koło–Barkowice Mokre area. Approaching Sulejów, the vanguard's lead element, including the commander, was fired upon. Advancing directly into combat, it reached Sulejów's center, discovering the "enemy" was actually outposts of the 76th Regiment, which had previously withdrawn.

During the march from Sulejów to Barkowice Mokre forest, the regiment was strafed by enemy aircraft. The 2nd Battalion commander, Captain Krupiński, went missing during this movement.

On 6 September, around 8:00 AM, the regiment reached Barkowice Mokre forest, taking up defensive positions on its southwestern edge. Shortly after, German aircraft began bombing and strafing the assembled units from 8:00 AM to 3:00 PM, immobilizing the regiment and causing numerous casualties. Only patrols conducted reconnaissance, identifying German armored columns advancing on Wolbórz. Partially outflanked and behind enemy lines, the regiment lost contact with the 29th Division headquarters. That afternoon, Colonel Banaszak decided to redeploy toward Kozienice, moving covertly through forests to avoid combat. At 7:00 PM, the regiment set out for Zarzęcin. Overnight on 6–7 September, it crossed the Pilica, during which Major Bolesław Szajda's battalion and Lieutenant Dubiak's reconnaissance company separated from the main force.

By the morning of 7 September, the regiment (minus the 1st Battalion and reconnaissance company) reached Trzebiatów forest lodge for a rest. Afterward, it moved through forests to Brzustów, reuniting with its 1st Battalion. During this movement, the main column was fired upon by saboteurs multiple times but maintained cohesion.

On 8 September, the regiment headed toward the Radom highway and Odrzywół. A reconnaissance patrol reported motorized German infantry south of Odrzywół along the Drzewica–Nowe Miasto nad Pilicą road. Colonel Banaszak turned the regiment back, halting at dawn on 9 September in a forest near the Pilica at Wólka Kuligowska. On 10 September, after dark, it moved from Wólka Kuligowska to Huta forest lodge via Radnice–Kraszków.

On the morning of 11 September, the vanguard encountered a German supply column near Kraszków. In the ensuing fight, the 30-vehicle column was destroyed, eight prisoners were taken, and the regiment lost two killed and two wounded.

The battle alerted the Germans, who attacked with infantry and tanks from Rozwady. The assault was repelled using the artillery platoon, anti-tank guns, and heavy machine guns. Harassed by air attacks, the regiment reached Przysucha forest around 3:00 PM on 11 September, establishing contact with Colonel Tadeusz Pełczyński's 19th Infantry Division group.

Overnight on 11–12 September, the resting 81st Regiment in Przysucha forest endured harassing fire from German heavy artillery from Kamienna Wola. The shelling persisted nearly all night, scattering and disorienting 2nd Battalion soldiers seeking cover, with several killed and about 30 wounded.

On 12 September at 12:00 PM, Colonel Banaszak held a briefing for subunit commanders. Around 2:00 PM, during the meeting, German forces attacked Polish positions. Truck-borne infantry advanced from the west and north along roads and clearings. The battle turned against the regiment. Captain Doctor Jurkowski brought about 45 wounded to the commander's position. Seeing no alternative, Banaszak ordered Jurkowski to evacuate the wounded to the nearest German hospital with the eight Kraszków prisoners. After further German assaults, Banaszak ordered a retreat toward Warsaw.

In the Przysucha forest battle, about 20 soldiers were killed. The scattered subunits could not be rallied, and the 81st Regiment ceased to exist as a cohesive unit.

== Regimental symbols ==
St. Hubert's Stag – a motif of the coat of arms of Grodno and the Grodno Regiment's banner

=== Banner ===
The most significant symbol of any regiment was its banner. Grodno's citizens decided early in the regiment's existence to donate a banner. However, it was only after the war, on 6 June 1921, that it was ceremonially presented in Vilnius by General Lucjan Żeligowski.

On 15 April 1922, Supreme Commander Józef Piłsudski arrived in Vilnius to take possession of the Vilnius Region on behalf of Poland. On 19 April, he decorated the banner with the Silver Cross of the Order Virtuti Militari.

From 28 January 1938, the regimental colors were officially termed a banner.

=== Commemorative badge ===
On 15 January 1929, Minister of Military Affairs, First Marshal of Poland Józef Piłsudski, approved the design and regulations for the 81st Infantry Regiment's commemorative badge. Measuring 41×26 millimeters, the badge was a cross encircled by a laurel wreath, with the Grodno Land coat of arms at the intersection. The arms bore the inscription "12 November 1918 Grodno Rifle Regiment". It was made of white metal or silver.

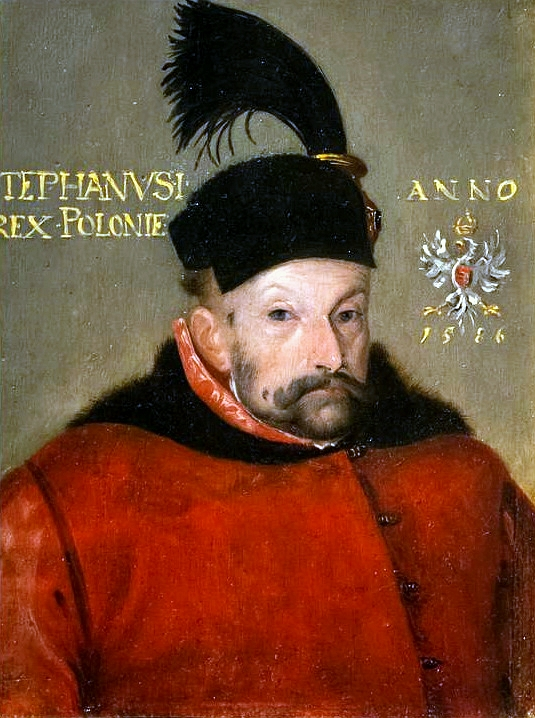
Stephen Báthory, patron of the 81st Regiment

=== Special badge ===
In 1933, Minister of Military Affairs Józef Piłsudski named the regiment the Grodno Rifle Regiment after King Stephen Báthory. This name inspired a special badge worn on shoulder straps – "SB" with a crown. The design was finalized in 1936 by Minister Tadeusz Kasprzycki.

== Grodno rifles ==
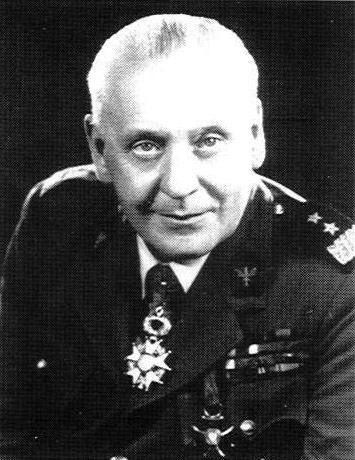
General Stanisław Maczek – regiment commander (1929–1934)

=== Regiment commanders ===
- Major Infantry Jan Jackiewicz (from 12 November 1918)
- Major Infantry Bronisław Bohaterewicz (acting from 23 January 1919)
- Colonel Infantry Franciszek Ostrowski (from March 1919)
- Lieutenant Colonel Infantry Kazimierz Rybicki (from 14 July 1919)
- Major Infantry Bronisław Bohaterewicz (from 6 December 1919)
- Lieutenant Colonel Infantry Seweryn Rymaszewski (18 October – † 19 November 1920)
- Lieutenant Colonel Infantry Bolesław Waśkiewicz (from 19 November 1920)
- Lieutenant Colonel Infantry Mieczysław Kaleński-Jaśkiewicz (acting from 17 May 1922)
- Lieutenant Colonel Infantry Robert Risy (until 13 June 1923 → Reserve of Staff Officers DOK V)
- Lieutenant Colonel/Colonel Infantry Władysław Wojtkiewicz (13 June 1923 – March 1929)
- Lieutenant Colonel/Colonel Diplomat Stanisław Maczek (March 1929 – 28 February 1935)
- Colonel Infantry Edward Banaszak (4 July 1935 – 12 September 1939)

=== Deputy commanders (from 1938, First Deputy Commander) ===
- Lieutenant Colonel Infantry Władysław Wojtkiewicz (10 July 1922 – 13 June 1923 → Regiment Commander)
- Lieutenant Colonel General Staff Mieczysław Wyżeł-Ścieżyński (from 1 August 1923)
- Major/Lieutenant Colonel Infantry Józef Wildmann (15 March 1924 – 20 March 1928 → At disposal of OK III Commander)
- Lieutenant Colonel Diplomat Infantry Edward Perkowicz (26 April 1928 – December 1930 → Inactive status)
- Lieutenant Colonel Infantry Antoni Wandtke (until November 1935 → 76th Regiment Commander)
- Lieutenant Colonel Infantry Józef Synoś (from 1936)
- Lieutenant Colonel Diplomat Infantry Zygmunt Cetnerowski (1939)
- Major/Lieutenant Colonel Infantry Stefan Mrozek (April 1935 – 1939)

=== Soldiers of the 81st Infantry Regiment – victims of the Katyn Massacre ===
Name	Rank	Profession	Pre-mobilization workplace	Murdered
Bielski, Stanisław	Lieutenant Reserve	Forestry engineer	Sieradz forest protection commissioner	Katyn
Bujnowski, Zygmunt	Second Lieutenant Reserve	Construction engineer	Pale-Franki company	Katyn
Kunda, Edmund	Lieutenant Reserve	Teacher	Grodno Public School	Katyn
Marcinkowski, Jerzy	Second Lieutenant Reserve	Engineer	Warsaw Municipal Administration	Katyn
Moser, Leopold	Lieutenant Retired			Katyn
Stęplewski, Jan	Lieutenant Reserve		GK bank in Warsaw	Katyn
Urbański, Bronisław	Second Lieutenant Reserve			Katyn
Cydzik, Zygmunt	Second Lieutenant Reserve	Clerk		Kharkiv
Gajlewicz, Kazimierz	Second Lieutenant Reserve			Kharkiv
Lange, Henryk	Second Lieutenant Reserve	Forestry industry technician		Kharkiv
Lewandowski, Józef	Warrant Officer	Professional soldier		Kharkiv
Marcinek, Antoni	Second Lieutenant Reserve	Veterinarian		Kharkiv
Markowski, Stefan	Lieutenant Reserve	Clerk		Kharkiv
Pawłowski, Roman	Second Lieutenant Reserve	Physician		Kharkiv
Pluta, Adam	Second Lieutenant Reserve	Teacher	School in Wysokie	Kharkiv
Radziszewski, Tomasz	Captain	Professional soldier	81st Regiment Bandmaster	Kharkiv
Rutkowski, Stanisław	Second Lieutenant Reserve	Clerk	Grodno Municipal Administration	Kharkiv
Samek, Stanisław	Lieutenant	Professional soldier	2nd Machine Gun Company Commander, 8th Legions Infantry Regiment	Kharkiv
Sarnosiek, Witold	Second Lieutenant Reserve	Agricultural engineer		Kharkiv
Wardecki, Tadeusz	Second Lieutenant Reserve			Kharkiv
Wolny, Dobrosław	Lieutenant Reserve	Engineer		Kharkiv
Wróblewski, Zygmunt	Second Lieutenant Reserve			Kharkiv

== Bibliography ==
- "Dziennik Personalny Ministerstwa Spraw Wojskowych" [Personnel Journal of the Ministry of Military Affairs]. Ministerstwo Spraw Wojskowych (in Polish).
- Dąbrowski, Jerzy (1928). Zarys historji wojennej 81-go Pułku Strzelców Grodzieńskich [Outline of the Military History of the 81st Grodno Rifle Regiment] (in Polish). Warsaw: Wojskowe Biuro Historyczne.
- Lisicki, Jerzy (1995). "Strzelcy Grodzieńscy": 81 Pułk Strzelców Grodzieńskich im. Króla Stefana Batorego ["Grodno Rifles": 81st Grodno Rifle Regiment named after King Stefan Batory] (in Polish). Białystok: Muzeum Wojska w Białymstoku. ISBN 83-86232-45-5.
- Rybka, Ryszard; Stepan, Kamil (2006). Rocznik oficerski 1939. Stan na dzień 23 marca 1939 [Officers' Yearbook 1939. Status as of 23 March 1939] (in Polish). Kraków: Fundacja CDCN. ISBN 9788371888991.
