= Skotniki, Piotrków County =

Skotniki
- Village
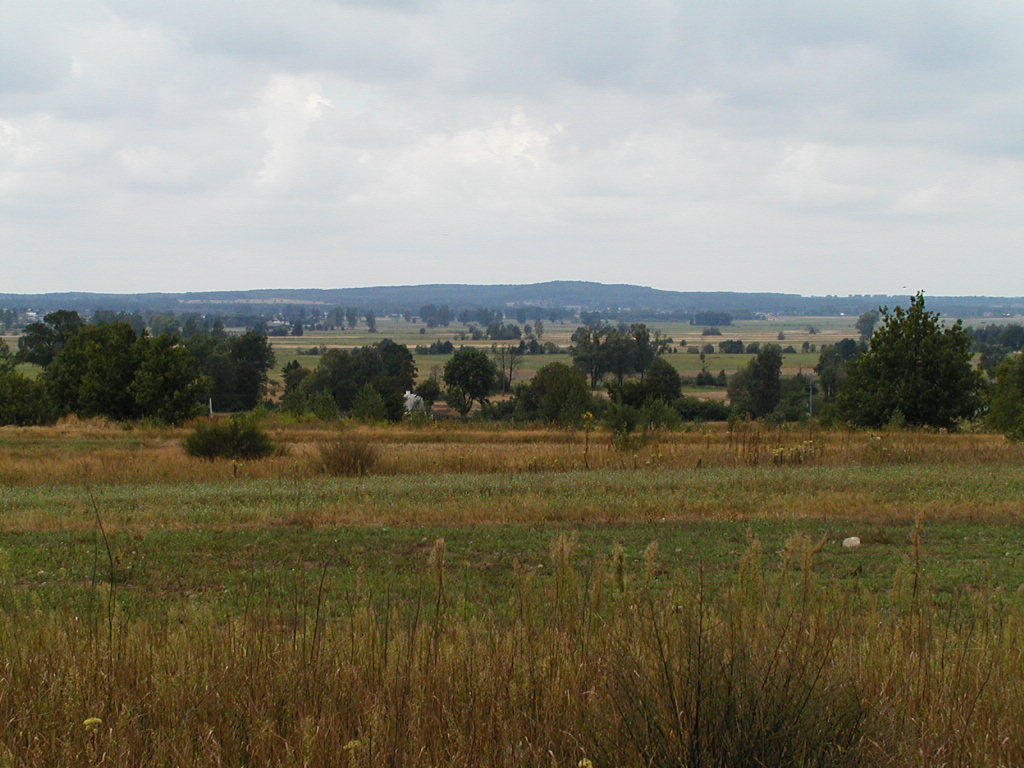

- Location within Poland
- Coordinates: 51°12′N 19°56′E
- Country: Poland
- Voivodeship: Łódź
- County: Piotrków
- Gmina: Aleksandrów

Skotniki [skɔtˈniki] is a village in the administrative district of Gmina Aleksandrów, within Piotrków County, Łódź Voivodeship, in central Poland.

Skotniki lies on the Pilica River. It contains a church from the year 1528 and a manor house (16th century) with a park from the turn of the 16th and 17th centuries. Skotniki is a famous summer resort. The village is on the "Szlak wodny Pilicy" - a kayak route on the Pilica River. In the area are Diabla Góra Nature Reserve (Polish: Rezerwat przyrody Diabla Góra) and a landscape park called Sulejów Landscape Park (Sulejowski Park Krajobrazowy).

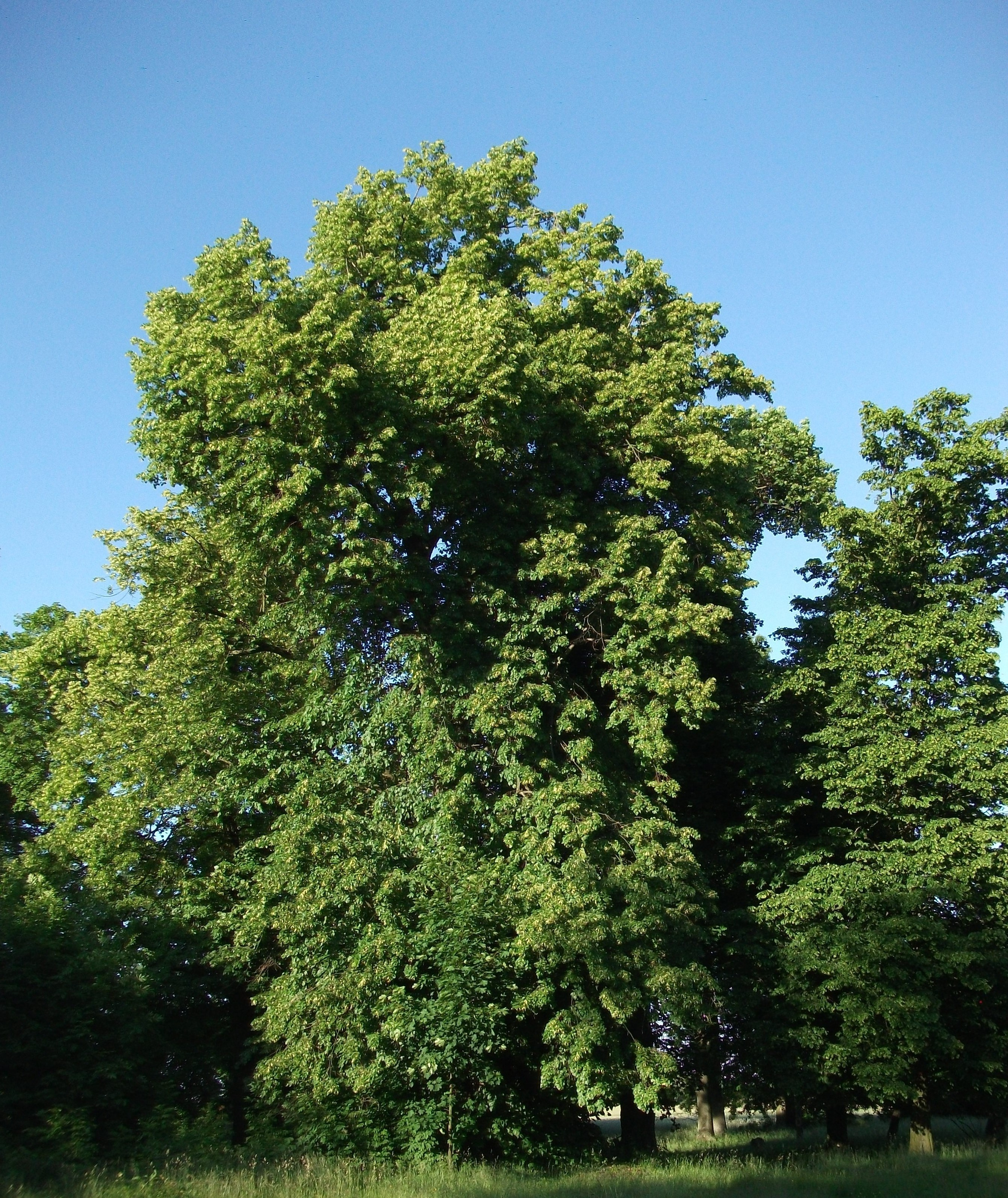
Fragment of linden avenue in the park from 16th and 17th centuries in Skotniki

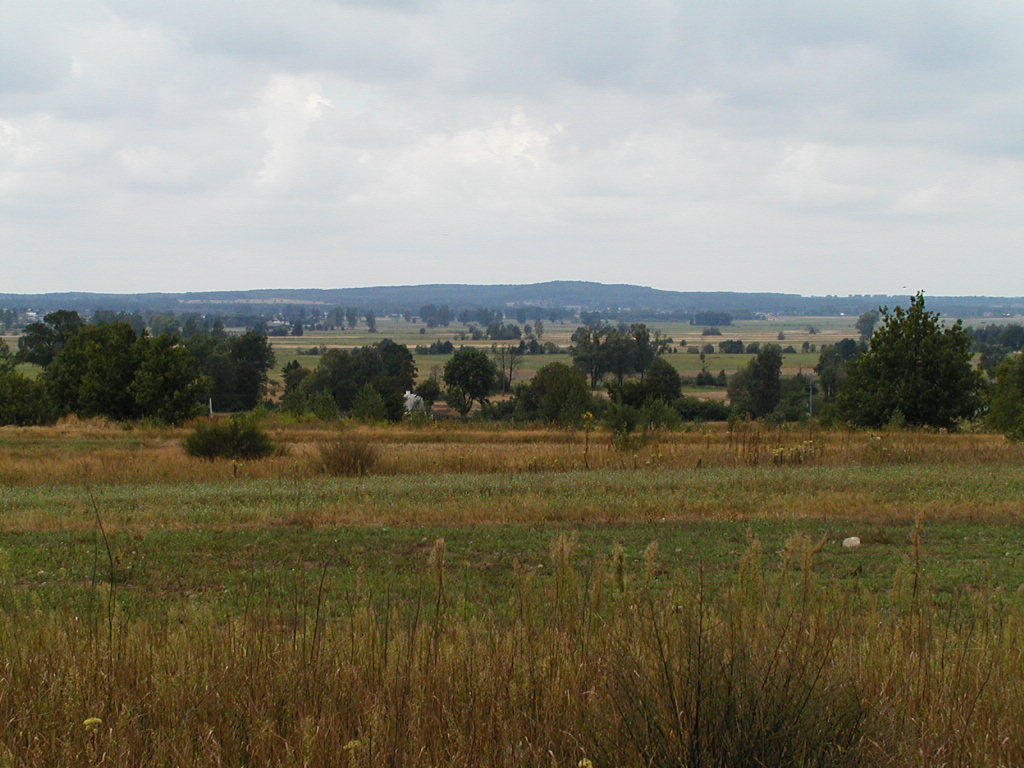
Skotniki's countryside: Diabla Góra Nature Reserve and Sulejów Landscape Park area
