= Janikowice =

Janikowice may refer to the following places:

- Janikowice, Kraków County in Lesser Poland Voivodeship (south Poland)
- Janikowice, Tarnów County in Lesser Poland Voivodeship (south Poland)
- Janikowice, Łódź Voivodeship (central Poland)
