= Zalesice =

Zalesice may refer to the following places:

- Zalesice, Łódź Voivodeship (central Poland)
- Zalesice, Masovian Voivodeship (east-central Poland)
- Zalesice, Silesian Voivodeship (south Poland)
