= Kałek =

Kałek may refer to the following places:

- Kałek, Greater Poland Voivodeship (west-central Poland)
- Kałek, Łódź Voivodeship (central Poland)
- Kałek, Lubusz Voivodeship (west Poland)
