= Krzewiny =

Krzewiny may refer to the following places:

- Krzewiny, Kuyavian-Pomeranian Voivodeship (north-central Poland)
- Krzewiny, Łódź Voivodeship (central Poland)
- Krzewiny, Lubusz Voivodeship (west Poland)
- Krzewiny, Pomeranian Voivodeship (north Poland)
