= Korytnica =

Korytnica may refer to:

- Korytnica, Łódź Voivodeship (central Poland)
- Korytnica, Jędrzejów County in Świętokrzyskie Voivodeship (south-central Poland)
- Korytnica, Staszów County in Świętokrzyskie Voivodeship (south-central Poland)
- Korytnica, Garwolin County in Masovian Voivodeship (east-central Poland)
- Korytnica, Węgrów County in Masovian Voivodeship (east-central Poland)
- Korytnica, Greater Poland Voivodeship (west-central Poland)

== See also ==
- Korytnica-kúpele (Slovakia)
