= Justynów =

Justynów may refer to the following places:

- Justynów, Łódź East County in Łódź Voivodeship (central Poland)
- Justynów, Piotrków County in Łódź Voivodeship (central Poland)
- Justynów, Sochaczew County in Masovian Voivodeship (east-central Poland)
- Justynów, Sokołów County in Masovian Voivodeship (east-central Poland)
