= Szarbsko =

- Village
- Location within Poland
- Coordinates: 51°15′N 19°56′E
- Country: Poland
- Voivodeship: Łódź
- County: Piotrków
- Gmina: Aleksandrów

Szarbsko [ˈʂarpskɔ] is a village in the administrative district of Gmina Aleksandrów, within Piotrków County, Łódź Voivodeship, in central Poland. It had a population of 133 as per a 2021 census.
