= Ciechomin, Łódź Voivodeship =

Ciechomin
- Village
- Location within Poland
- Coordinates: 51°16′19″N 20°1′54″E
- Country: Poland
- Voivodeship: Łódź
- County: Piotrków
- Gmina: Aleksandrów
- Population: 280

Ciechomin [t͡ɕɛˈxɔmin] is a village in the administrative district of Gmina Aleksandrów, within Piotrków County, Łódź Voivodeship, in central Poland.
