= Aleksandrów, Piotrków County =

Aleksandrów
- Village
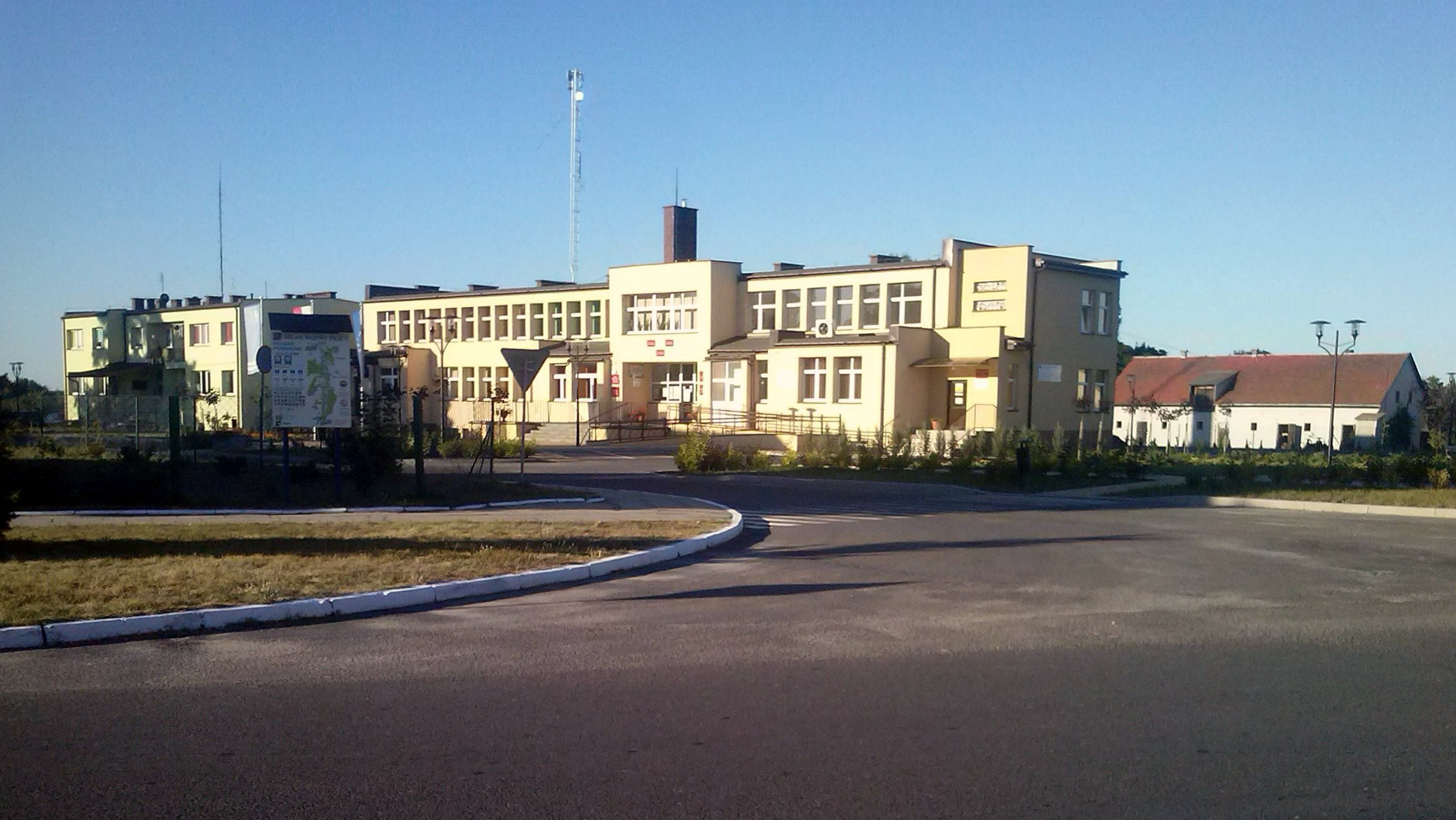
- Seat of the municipality

- Flag Coat of arms

- Location within Poland
- Coordinates: 51°16′13″N 19°59′14″E
- Country: Poland
- Voivodeship: Łódź
- County: Piotrków
- Gmina: Aleksandrów
- Population: 500

Aleksandrów [alɛkˈsandruf] is a village in Piotrków County, Łódź Voivodeship, in central Poland. It is the seat of the gmina (administrative district) called Gmina Aleksandrów.
