= Siucice =

- Village
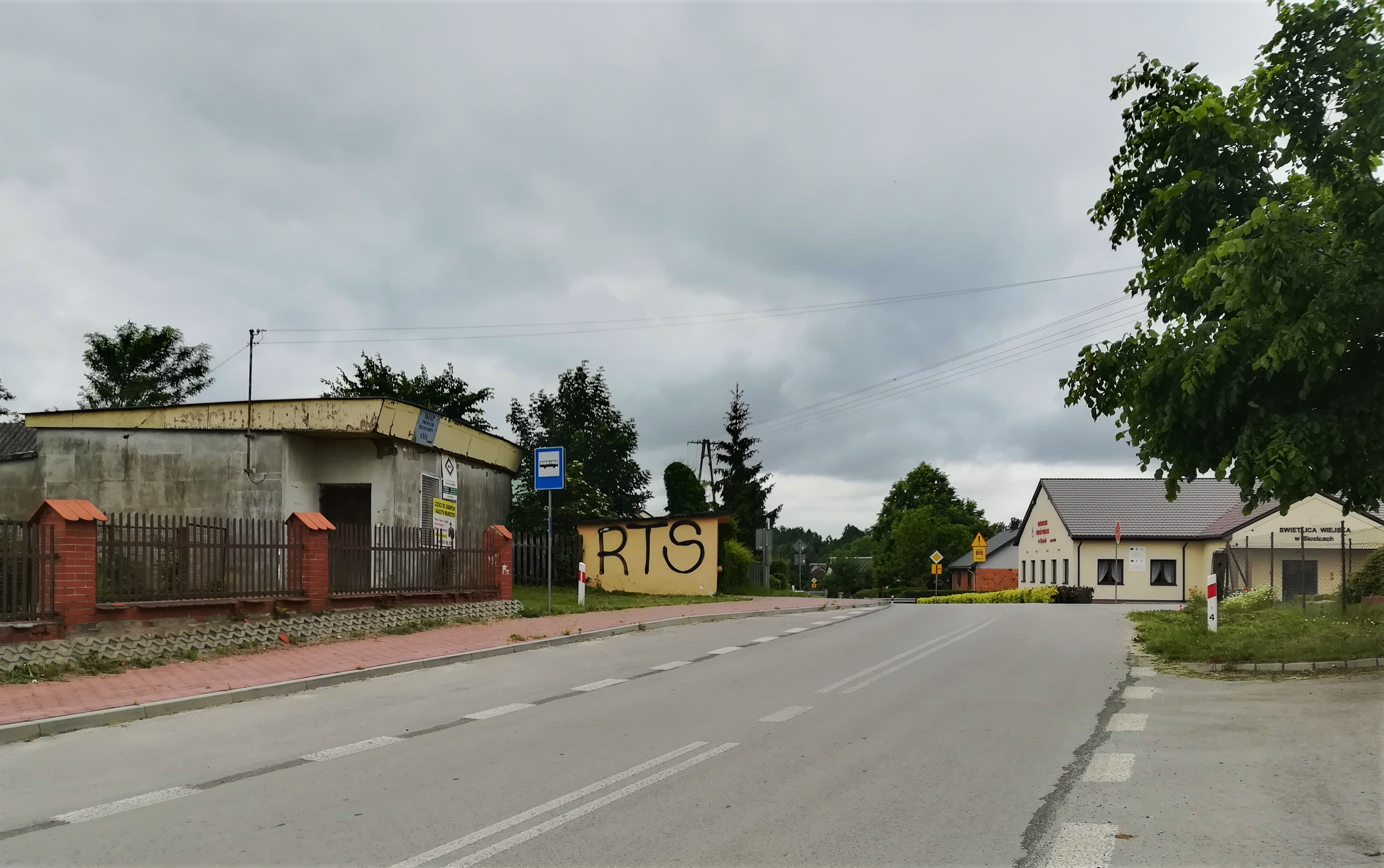

- Location within Poland
- Coordinates: 51°15′N 20°2′E
- Country: Poland
- Voivodeship: Łódź
- County: Piotrków
- Gmina: Aleksandrów

Siucice [ɕuˈt͡ɕit͡sɛ] is a village in the administrative district of Gmina Aleksandrów, within Piotrków County, Łódź Voivodeship, in central Poland.
