= Włodzimierzów, Gmina Sulejów =

Włodzimierzów
- Village
- Location within Poland
- Coordinates: 51°22′17″N 19°49′29″E
- Country: Poland
- Voivodeship: Łódź
- County: Piotrków
- Gmina: Sulejów
- Population: 1,300

Włodzimierzów [vwɔd͡ʑiˈmjɛʐuf] is a village in the administrative district of Gmina Sulejów, within Piotrków County, Łódź Voivodeship, in central Poland.
