= Nowa Wieś, Gmina Sulejów =

Nowa Wieś
- Village
- Location within Poland
- Coordinates: 51°24′25″N 19°49′51″E
- Country: Poland
- Voivodeship: Łódź
- County: Piotrków
- Gmina: Sulejów

Nowa Wieś [ˈnɔva ˈvjɛɕ] is a village in the administrative district of Gmina Sulejów, within Piotrków County, Łódź Voivodeship, in central Poland.
