= Podlubień =

Village in Gmina Sulejów, Poland

- Village
- Location within Poland
- Coordinates: 51°18′58″N 19°49′42″E
- Country: Poland
- Voivodeship: Łódź
- County: Piotrków
- Gmina: Sulejów

Podlubień [pɔdˈlubjɛɲ] is a village in the administrative district of Gmina Sulejów, within Piotrków County, Łódź Voivodeship, in central Poland.
