= Salkowszczyzna =

- Settlement
- Location within Poland
- Coordinates: 51°16′2″N 19°52′1″E
- Country: Poland
- Voivodeship: Łódź
- County: Piotrków
- Gmina: Sulejów

Salkowszczyzna [salkɔfʂˈt͡ʂɨzna] is a settlement located in the administrative district of Gmina Sulejów, within Piotrków County, Łódź Voivodeship, in central Poland.
