= Niewierszyn =

- Village
- Location within Poland
- Coordinates: 51°17′41″N 19°55′35″E
- Country: Poland
- Voivodeship: Łódź
- County: Piotrków
- Gmina: Aleksandrów
- Population: 260

Niewierszyn [ɲɛˈvjɛrʂɨn] is a village in the administrative district of Gmina Aleksandrów, within Piotrków County, Łódź Voivodeship, in central Poland.
