= Rożenek =

- Village
- Location within Poland
- Coordinates: 51°17′N 20°2′E
- Country: Poland
- Voivodeship: Łódź
- County: Piotrków
- Gmina: Aleksandrów

Rożenek [rɔˈʐɛnɛk] is a village in the administrative district of Gmina Aleksandrów, within Piotrków County, Łódź Voivodeship, in central Poland.
