= Wacławów, Piotrków County =

Wacławów
- Village
- Location within Poland
- Coordinates: 51°12′17″N 19°58′21″E
- Country: Poland
- Voivodeship: Łódź
- County: Piotrków
- Gmina: Aleksandrów
- Population: 60

Wacławów [vat͡sˈwavuf] is a village in the administrative district of Gmina Aleksandrów, within Piotrków County, Łódź Voivodeship, in central Poland.
