= Dorotów, Łódź Voivodeship =

Dorotów
- Settlement
- Location within Poland
- Coordinates: 51°17′5″N 19°51′12″E
- Country: Poland
- Voivodeship: Łódź
- County: Piotrków
- Gmina: Sulejów

Dorotów [dɔˈrɔtuf] is a settlement in the administrative district of Gmina Sulejów, within Piotrków County, Łódź Voivodeship, in central Poland.
