= Ostrów, Gmina Aleksandrów =

Ostrów
- Village
- Location within Poland
- Coordinates: 51°18′13″N 19°54′54″E
- Country: Poland
- Voivodeship: Łódź
- County: Piotrków
- Gmina: Aleksandrów
- Population: 20

Ostrów [ˈɔstruf] is a village in the administrative district of Gmina Aleksandrów, within Piotrków County, Łódź Voivodeship, in central Poland.
