= Koło, Łódź Voivodeship =

Koło
- Village
- Location within Poland
- Coordinates: 51°25′37″N 19°49′48″E
- Country: Poland
- Voivodeship: Łódź
- County: Piotrków
- Gmina: Sulejów

Koło [ˈkɔwɔ] is a village in the administrative district of Gmina Sulejów, within Piotrków County, Łódź Voivodeship, in central Poland.
