= Adelinów =

- Settlement
- Location within Poland
- Coordinates: 51°16′59″N 19°52′39″E
- Country: Poland
- Voivodeship: Łódź
- County: Piotrków
- Gmina: Sulejów

Adelinów [adɛˈlinuf] is a settlement in the administrative district of Gmina Sulejów, within Piotrków County, Łódź Voivodeship, in central Poland.
