= Stara Kolonia, Łódź Voivodeship =

Stara Kolonia
- Village
- Location within Poland
- Coordinates: 51°14′3″N 19°57′56″E
- Country: Poland
- Voivodeship: Łódź
- County: Piotrków
- Gmina: Aleksandrów
- Population: 120

Stara Kolonia [ˈstara kɔˈlɔɲa] is a village in the administrative district of Gmina Aleksandrów, within Piotrków County, Łódź Voivodeship, in central Poland.
