= Uszczyn =

- Village
- Location within Poland
- Coordinates: 51°24′08″N 19°46′30″E
- Country: Poland
- Voivodeship: Łódź
- County: Piotrków
- Gmina: Sulejów

Uszczyn [ˈuʂt͡ʂɨn] is a village in the administrative district of Gmina Sulejów, within Piotrków County, Łódź Voivodeship, in central Poland.
