= Brzezie, Piotrków County =

Brzezie
- Village
- Location within Poland
- Coordinates: 51°12′12″N 19°59′47″E
- Country: Poland
- Voivodeship: Łódź
- County: Piotrków
- Gmina: Aleksandrów
- Population: 60

Brzezie [ˈbʐɛʑɛ] is a village in the administrative district of Gmina Aleksandrów, within Piotrków County, Łódź Voivodeship, in central Poland.
