= Bilska Wola =

- Village
- Location within Poland
- Coordinates: 51°16′48″N 19°50′15″E
- Country: Poland
- Voivodeship: Łódź
- County: Piotrków
- Gmina: Sulejów

Bilska Wola [ˈbilska ˈvɔla] is a village in the administrative district of Gmina Sulejów, within Piotrków County, Łódź Voivodeship, in central Poland.
