= Łazy-Dąbrowa =

Village in Gmina Sulejów, Poland

- Village
- Location within Poland
- Coordinates: 51°18′54″N 19°46′09″E
- Country: Poland
- Voivodeship: Łódź
- County: Piotrków
- Gmina: Sulejów

Łazy-Dąbrowa [ˈwazɨ dɔmˈbrɔva] is a village in the administrative district of Gmina Sulejów, within Piotrków County, Łódź Voivodeship, in central Poland.
