= Biała, Piotrków County =

Biała
- Village
- Location within Poland
- Coordinates: 51°17′56″N 19°52′19″E
- Country: Poland
- Voivodeship: Łódź
- County: Piotrków
- Gmina: Sulejów

Biała [ˈbjawa] is a village in the administrative district of Gmina Sulejów, within Piotrków County, Łódź Voivodeship, in central Poland.
