= Mikołajów, Piotrków County =

Mikołajów
- Settlement
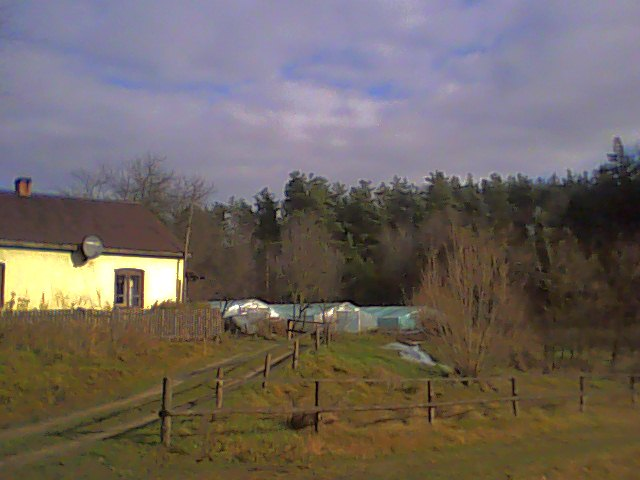

- Location within Poland
- Coordinates: 51°16′35″N 19°52′09″E
- Country: Poland
- Voivodeship: Łódź
- County: Piotrków
- Gmina: Sulejów

Mikołajów [mikɔˈwajuf] is a settlement in the administrative district of Gmina Sulejów, within Piotrków County, Łódź Voivodeship, in central Poland. 14 people live in Mikołajów.
