= Winduga, Łódź Voivodeship =

Winduga
- Settlement
- Location within Poland
- Coordinates: 51°16′37″N 19°54′14″E
- Country: Poland
- Voivodeship: Łódź
- County: Piotrków
- Gmina: Sulejów

Winduga [vinˈduɡa] is a settlement in the administrative district of Gmina Sulejów, within Piotrków County, Łódź Voivodeship, in central Poland.
