= Marianów, Gmina Aleksandrów =

Marianów
- Village
- Location within Poland
- Coordinates: 51°16′8″N 20°0′21″E
- Country: Poland
- Voivodeship: Łódź
- County: Piotrków
- Gmina: Aleksandrów
- Population: 140

Marianów [maˈrjanuf] is a village in the administrative district of Gmina Aleksandrów, within Piotrków County, Łódź Voivodeship, in central Poland.
