= Nowy Reczków =

- Village
- Location within Poland
- Coordinates: 51°12′58″N 19°57′4″E
- Country: Poland
- Voivodeship: Łódź
- County: Piotrków
- Gmina: Aleksandrów
- Population: 200

Nowy Reczków [ˈnɔvɨ ˈrɛt͡ʂkuf] is a village in the administrative district of Gmina Aleksandrów, within Piotrków County, Łódź Voivodeship, in central Poland.
