= Klementynów, Łódź Voivodeship =

Klementynów
- Village
- Location within Poland
- Coordinates: 51°18′N 19°51′E
- Country: Poland
- Voivodeship: Łódź
- County: Piotrków
- Gmina: Sulejów

Klementynów [klɛmɛnˈtɨnuf] is a village in the administrative district of Gmina Sulejów, within Piotrków County, Łódź Voivodeship, in central Poland.
