= Poniatów, Piotrków County =

Poniatów
- Village
- Location within Poland
- Coordinates: 51°23′35″N 19°45′48″E
- Country: Poland
- Voivodeship: Łódź
- County: Piotrków
- Gmina: Sulejów

Poniatów [pɔˈɲatuf] is a village in the administrative district of Gmina Sulejów, within Piotrków County, Łódź Voivodeship, in central Poland.
