= Sieczka, Łódź Voivodeship =

Sieczka
- Village
- Location within Poland
- Coordinates: 51°17′N 19°57′E
- Country: Poland
- Voivodeship: Łódź
- County: Piotrków
- Gmina: Aleksandrów

Sieczka [ˈɕɛt͡ʂka] is a village in the administrative district of Gmina Aleksandrów, within Piotrków County, Łódź Voivodeship, in central Poland.
