= Zalesice-Kolonia, Łódź Voivodeship =

Zalesice-Kolonia
- Village
- Location within Poland
- Coordinates: 51°22′5″N 19°43′24″E
- Country: Poland
- Voivodeship: Łódź
- County: Piotrków
- Gmina: Sulejów

Zalesice-Kolonia [zalɛˈɕit͡sɛ kɔˈlɔɲa] is a village in the administrative district of Gmina Sulejów, within Piotrków County, Łódź Voivodeship, in central Poland.
