= Piotrów, Piotrków County =

Piotrów
- Settlement
- Location within Poland
- Coordinates: 51°17′23″N 19°51′27″E
- Country: Poland
- Voivodeship: Łódź
- County: Piotrków
- Gmina: Sulejów

Piotrów [ˈpjɔtruf] is a settlement in the administrative district of Gmina Sulejów, within Piotrków County, Łódź Voivodeship, in central Poland.
