= Kotuszów, Łódź Voivodeship =

Kotuszów
- Village
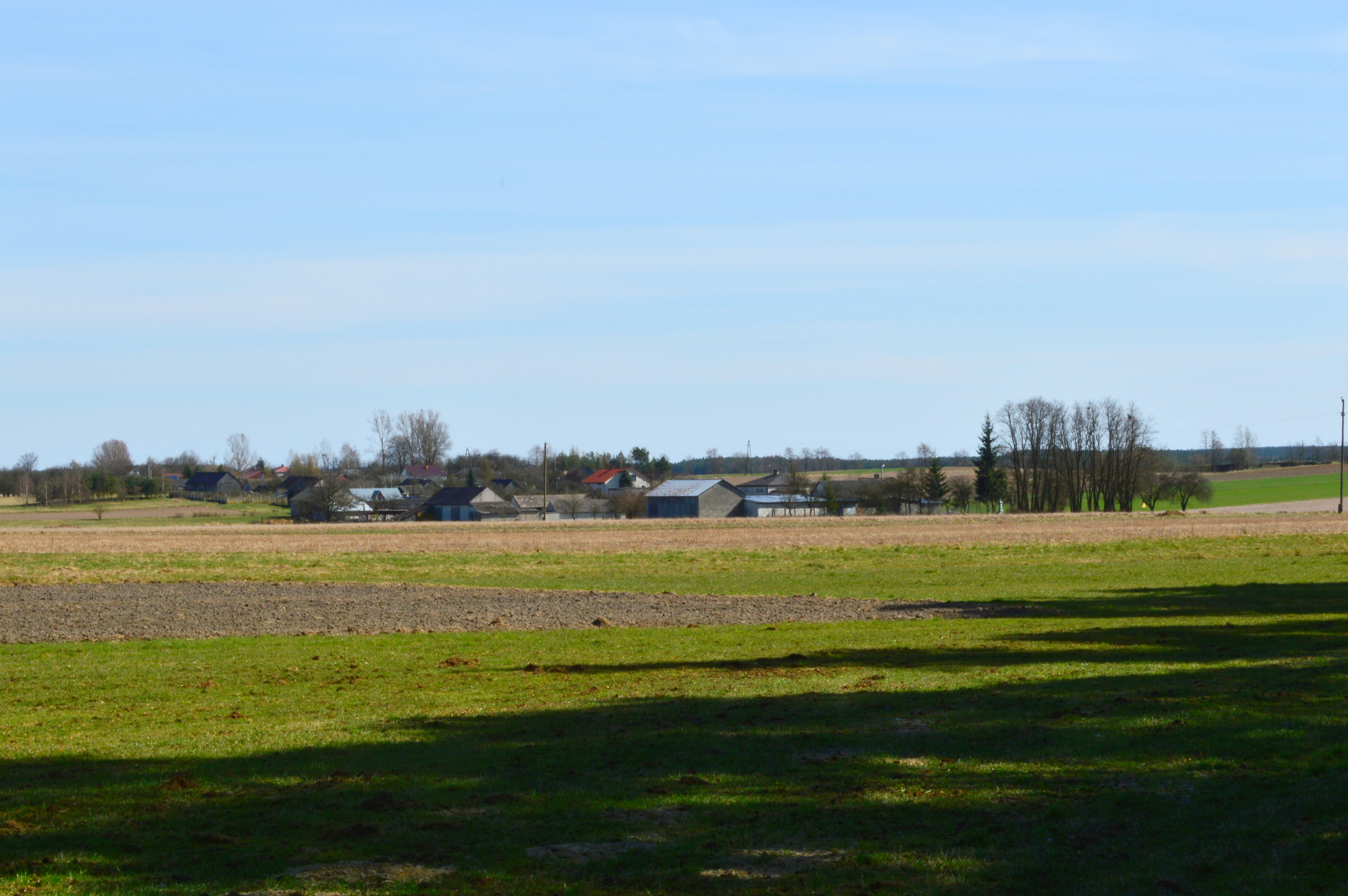

- Location within Poland
- Coordinates: 51°19′36″N 19°59′35″E
- Country: Poland
- Voivodeship: Łódź
- County: Piotrków
- Gmina: Aleksandrów
- Population: 280

Kotuszów [kɔˈtuʂuf] is a village in the administrative district of Gmina Aleksandrów, within Piotrków County, Łódź Voivodeship, in central Poland.
