= Dąbrówka, Gmina Aleksandrów =

Dąbrówka
- Village
- Location within Poland
- Coordinates: 51°14′59″N 19°56′53″E
- Country: Poland
- Voivodeship: Łódź
- County: Piotrków
- Gmina: Aleksandrów
- Population: 220

Dąbrówka [dɔmˈbrufka] is a village in the administrative district of Gmina Aleksandrów, within Piotrków County, Łódź Voivodeship, in central Poland.
