= Bilska Wola-Kolonia =

- City
- Location within Poland
- Coordinates: 51°17′N 19°51′E
- Country: Poland
- Voivodeship: Łódź
- County: Piotrków
- Gmina: Sulejów

Bilska Wola-Kolonia [ˈbilska ˈvɔla kɔˈlɔɲa] is a village in the administrative district of Gmina Sulejów, within Piotrków County, Łódź Voivodeship, in central Poland.
