= Siucice-Kolonia =

- Village
- Location within Poland
- Coordinates: 51°14′45″N 20°2′15″E
- Country: Poland
- Voivodeship: Łódź
- County: Piotrków
- Gmina: Aleksandrów
- Population: 160

Siucice-Kolonia [ɕuˈt͡ɕit͡sɛ kɔˈlɔɲa] is a village in the administrative district of Gmina Aleksandrów, within Piotrków County, Łódź Voivodeship, in central Poland.
