= Borowiec, Piotrków County =

Borowiec
- Village
- Location within Poland
- Coordinates: 51°18′2″N 20°0′46″E
- Country: Poland
- Voivodeship: Łódź
- County: Piotrków
- Gmina: Aleksandrów
- Population: 140

Borowiec [bɔˈrɔvjɛt͡s] is a village in the administrative district of Gmina Aleksandrów, within Piotrków County, Łódź Voivodeship, in central Poland.
