= Gmina Sulejów =

Gmina Sulejów Sulejów Commune
- Gmina
- Flag Coat of arms
- Interactive map of Gmina Sulejów
- Coordinates (Sulejów): 51°21′10″N 19°53′5″E
- Country: Poland
- Voivodeship: Łódź
- County: Piotrków County
- Seat: Sulejów

Area
  - Total: 189.45 km^{2} (73.15 sq mi)

Population (2006)
  - Total: 15,581
  - Density: 82.243/km^{2} (213.01/sq mi)
  - Urban: 6,387
  - Rural: 9,194
- Website: http://www.sulejow.pl

Gmina Sulejów is an urban-rural gmina (administrative district) in Piotrków County, Łódź Voivodeship, in central Poland. Its seat is the town of Sulejów, which lies approximately 15 kilometres (9 mi) east of Piotrków Trybunalski and 56 km (35 mi) south-east of the regional capital Łódź.

The gmina covers an area of 189.45 square kilometres (73.1 sq mi), and as of 2006 its total population is 15,581 (out of which the population of Sulejów amounts to 6,387, and the population of the rural part of the gmina is 9,194).

The gmina contains part of the protected area called Sulejów Landscape Park.

== Villages ==
Apart from the town of Sulejów, Gmina Sulejów contains the villages and settlements of Adelinów, Barkowice, Barkowice Mokre, Biała, Bilska Wola, Bilska Wola-Kolonia, Dorotów, Kałek, Karolinów, Klementynów, Kłudzice, Koło, Korytnica, Krzewiny, Kurnędz, Łazy-Dąbrowa, Łęczno, Mikołajów, Nowa Wieś, Piotrów, Podkałek, Podlubień, Poniatów, Przygłów, Salkowszczyzna, Uszczyn, Winduga, Witów, Witów-Kolonia, Włodzimierzów, Wójtostwo, Zalesice and Zalesice-Kolonia.

== Neighbouring gminas ==
Gmina Sulejów is bordered by the city of Piotrków Trybunalski and by the gminas of Aleksandrów, Mniszków, Ręczno, Rozprza and Wolbórz.
