= Wolica, Piotrków County =

Wolica
- Village
- Location within Poland
- Coordinates: 51°14′9″N 20°0′23″E
- Country: Poland
- Voivodeship: Łódź
- County: Piotrków
- Gmina: Aleksandrów
- Population: 100

Wolica [vɔˈlit͡sa] is a village in the administrative district of Gmina Aleksandrów, within Piotrków County, Łódź Voivodeship, in central Poland.

In 2005 the village had a population of 100.
