= Kalinków =

- Village
- Location within Poland
- Coordinates: 51°17′32″N 19°59′48″E
- Country: Poland
- Voivodeship: Łódź
- County: Piotrków
- Gmina: Aleksandrów
- Population: 180

Kalinków [kaˈlinkuf] is a village in the administrative district of Gmina Aleksandrów, within Piotrków County, Łódź Voivodeship, in central Poland.
