= Witów, Piotrków County =

Witów
- Village
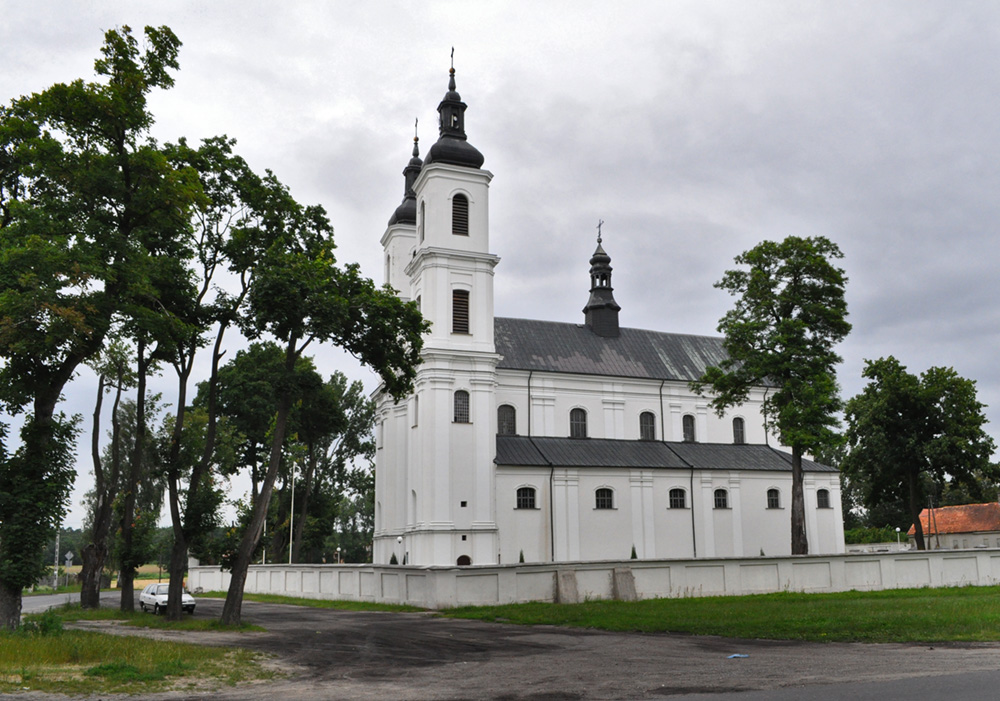
- Catholic church

- Location within Poland
- Coordinates: 51°22′N 19°45′E
- Country: Poland
- Voivodeship: Łódź
- County: Piotrków
- Gmina: Sulejów

Witów [ˈvituf] is a village in the administrative district of Gmina Sulejów, within Piotrków County, Łódź Voivodeship, in central Poland.
