= Kłudzice =

- Village
- Location within Poland
- Coordinates: 51°21′14″N 19°46′36″E
- Country: Poland
- Voivodeship: Łódź
- County: Piotrków
- Gmina: Sulejów

Kłudzice [kwuˈd͡ʑit͡sɛ] is a village in the administrative district of Gmina Sulejów, within Piotrków County, Łódź Voivodeship, in central Poland.
