= Barkowice =

- Village
- Location within Poland
- Coordinates: 51°24′N 19°51′E
- Country: Poland
- Voivodeship: Łódź
- County: Piotrków
- Gmina: Sulejów
- Population: 395

Barkowice [barkɔˈvit͡sɛ] is a village in the administrative district of Gmina Sulejów, within Piotrków County, Łódź Voivodeship, in central Poland.
