= Włodzimierzów, Gmina Aleksandrów =

Włodzimierzów
- Village
- Location within Poland
- Coordinates: 51°19′41″N 19°58′2″E
- Country: Poland
- Voivodeship: Łódź
- County: Piotrków
- Gmina: Aleksandrów
- Population: 100

Włodzimierzów [vwɔd͡ʑiˈmjɛʐuf] is a village in the administrative district of Gmina Aleksandrów, within Piotrków County, Łódź Voivodeship, in central Poland.
