= Wójtostwo, Piotrków County =

Wójtostwo
- Village
- Location within Poland
- Coordinates: 51°20′N 19°51′E
- Country: Poland
- Voivodeship: Łódź
- County: Piotrków
- Gmina: Sulejów

Wójtostwo [vui̯ˈtɔstfɔ] is a village in the administrative district of Gmina Sulejów, within Piotrków County, Łódź Voivodeship, in central Poland.
