= Kawęczyn, Piotrków County =

Kawęczyn
- Village
- Location within Poland
- Coordinates: 51°16′20″N 19°57′48″E
- Country: Poland
- Voivodeship: Łódź
- County: Piotrków
- Gmina: Aleksandrów
- Population: 80

Kawęczyn [kaˈvɛnt͡ʂɨn] is a village in the administrative district of Gmina Aleksandrów, within Piotrków County, Łódź Voivodeship, in central Poland.
