= Sulejów Landscape Park =

Protected area in Poland

Coordinates: 51°20′00″N 19°54′20″E

- Sulejowski Park Krajobrazowy
- IUCN category V (protected landscape/seascape)
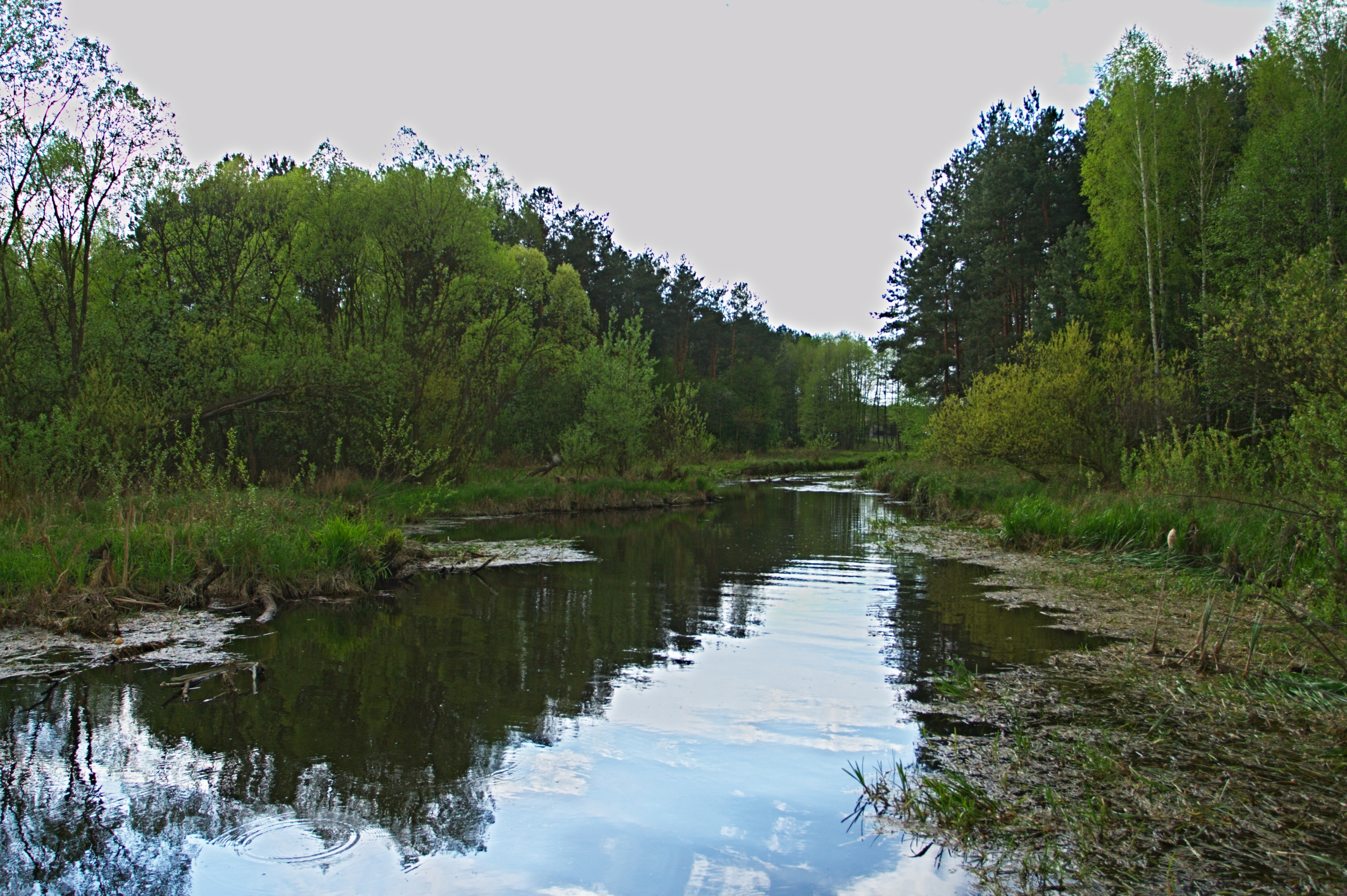
- Interactive map of Sulejów Landscape Park
- Location: Łódź Voivodeship
- Area: 171 km^{2} (66 sq mi)
- Established: 1994

Sulejów Landscape Park (Sulejowski Park Krajobrazowy) is a protected area (Landscape Park) in central Poland, established in 1994 and covering an area of 171 square kilometres (66 sq mi). It takes its name from the town of Sulejów.

The Park lies within Łódź Voivodeship: in Opoczno County (Gmina Mniszków), Piotrków County (Gmina Aleksandrów, Gmina Ręczno, Gmina Sulejów, Gmina Wolbórz) and Tomaszów County (Gmina Tomaszów Mazowiecki).

Sulejów Landscape Park protects forests near Pilica river. In Niebieskie Źródła Nature Reserve in the town of Tomaszów Mazowiecki there is a unique natural karst spring of water containing calcium salts. The origin of the name of the reserve Niebieskie Źródła, that means Blue Springs, comes from the fact that red waves are absorbed by water and only blue and green are reflected from the bottom of the spring, giving that atypical colour.
