= Podkałek =

- Village
- Location within Poland
- Coordinates: 51°23′N 19°47′E
- Country: Poland
- Voivodeship: Łódź
- County: Piotrków
- Gmina: Sulejów

Podkałek [pɔtˈkawɛk] is a village in the administrative district of Gmina Sulejów, within Piotrków County, Łódź Voivodeship, in central Poland.
