= Dębowa Góra, Piotrków County =

Dębowa Góra
- Village
- Location within Poland
- Coordinates: 51°18′35″N 19°58′21″E
- Country: Poland
- Voivodeship: Łódź
- County: Piotrków
- Gmina: Aleksandrów
- Population: 120

Dębowa Góra [dɛmˈbɔva ˈɡura] is a village in the administrative district of Gmina Aleksandrów, within Piotrków County, Łódź Voivodeship, in central Poland.
