= Dębowa Góra-Kolonia =

- Village
- Location within Poland
- Coordinates: 51°18′16″N 19°57′43″E
- Country: Poland
- Voivodeship: Łódź
- County: Piotrków
- Gmina: Aleksandrów population = 100

Dębowa Góra-Kolonia [dɛmˈbɔva ˈɡura kɔˈlɔɲa] is a village in the administrative district of Gmina Aleksandrów, within Piotrków County, Łódź Voivodeship, in central Poland.
