= Karolinów, Piotrków County =

Karolinów
- Village
- Location within Poland
- Coordinates: 51°17′52″N 19°49′12″E
- Country: Poland
- Voivodeship: Łódź
- County: Piotrków
- Gmina: Sulejów
- Population: 80

Karolinów [karɔˈlinuf] is a village in the administrative district of Gmina Sulejów, within Piotrków County, Łódź Voivodeship, in central Poland.
