= Jaksonek =

- Village
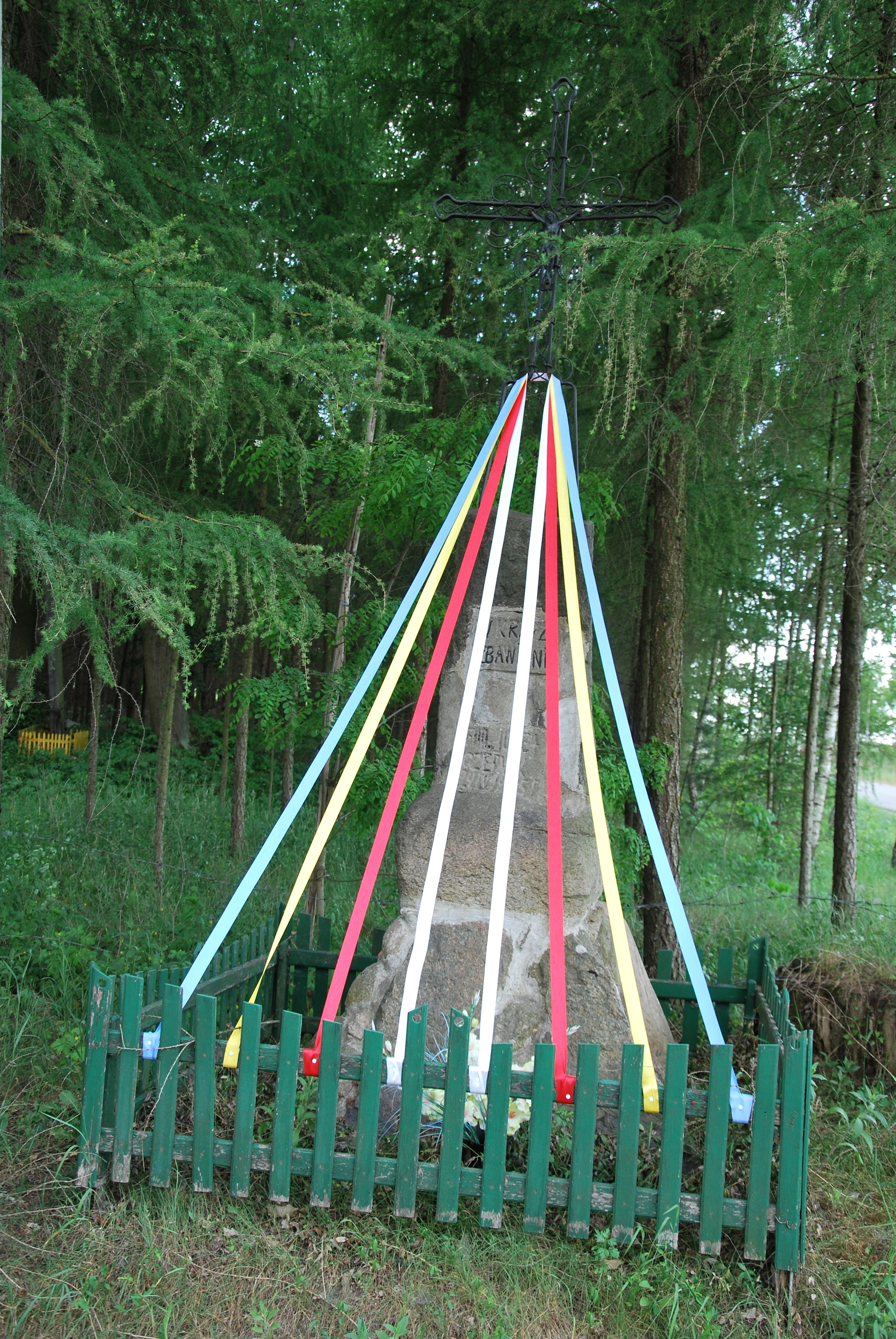

- Location within Poland
- Coordinates: 51°20′17″N 19°57′33″E
- Country: Poland
- Voivodeship: Łódź
- County: Piotrków
- Gmina: Aleksandrów
- Population: 180

Jaksonek [jakˈsɔnɛk] is a village in the administrative district of Gmina Aleksandrów, within Piotrków County, Łódź Voivodeship, in central Poland.
