= Sulejów =

Town in Łódź Voivodeship, Poland

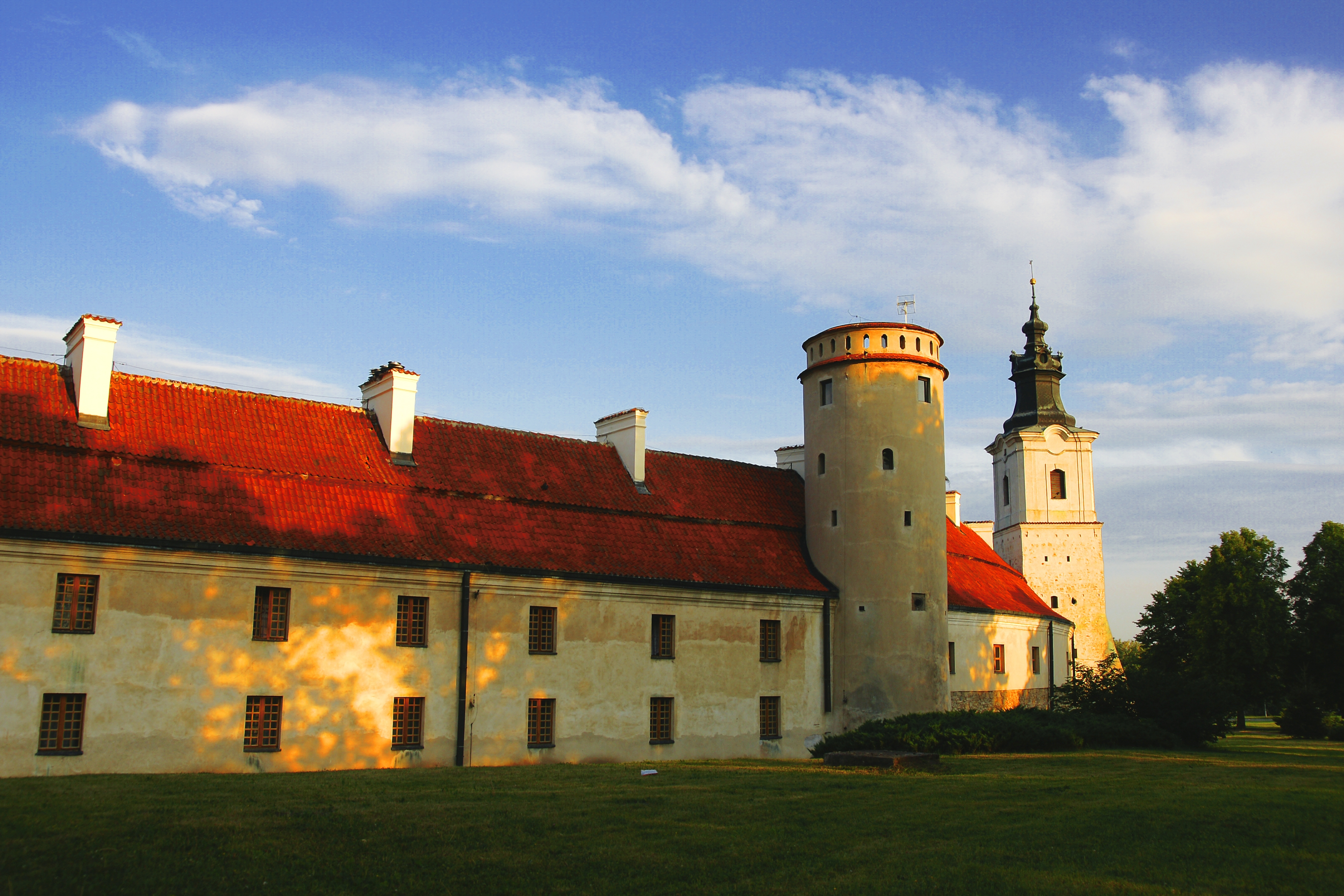
- Sulejów Abbey

- Flag Coat of arms

- Location within Poland
- Coordinates: 51°21′10″N 19°53′5″E
- Country: Poland
- Voivodeship: Łódź
- County: Piotrków
- Gmina: Sulejów
- First mentioned: 1145
- Town rights: 13th century

Government
  - Mayor: Dorota Jankowska
  - Chairman of the Town Council: Rafał Kulbat

Area
  - Total: 26.25 km^{2} (10.14 sq mi)

Population (31 December 2020)
  - Total: 6,130 ▼
  - Density: 234/km^{2} (605/sq mi)
- Time zone: UTC+1 (CET)
  - Summer (DST): UTC+2 (CEST)
- Postal code: 97-330
- Vehicle registration: EPI
- Website: http://www.sulejow.pl

Sulejów [suˈlɛjuf] is a town in central Poland with 6,130 inhabitants (2020). It is situated in Łódź Voivodeship. Sulejów gives its name to the protected area known as Sulejów Landscape Park.

== History ==
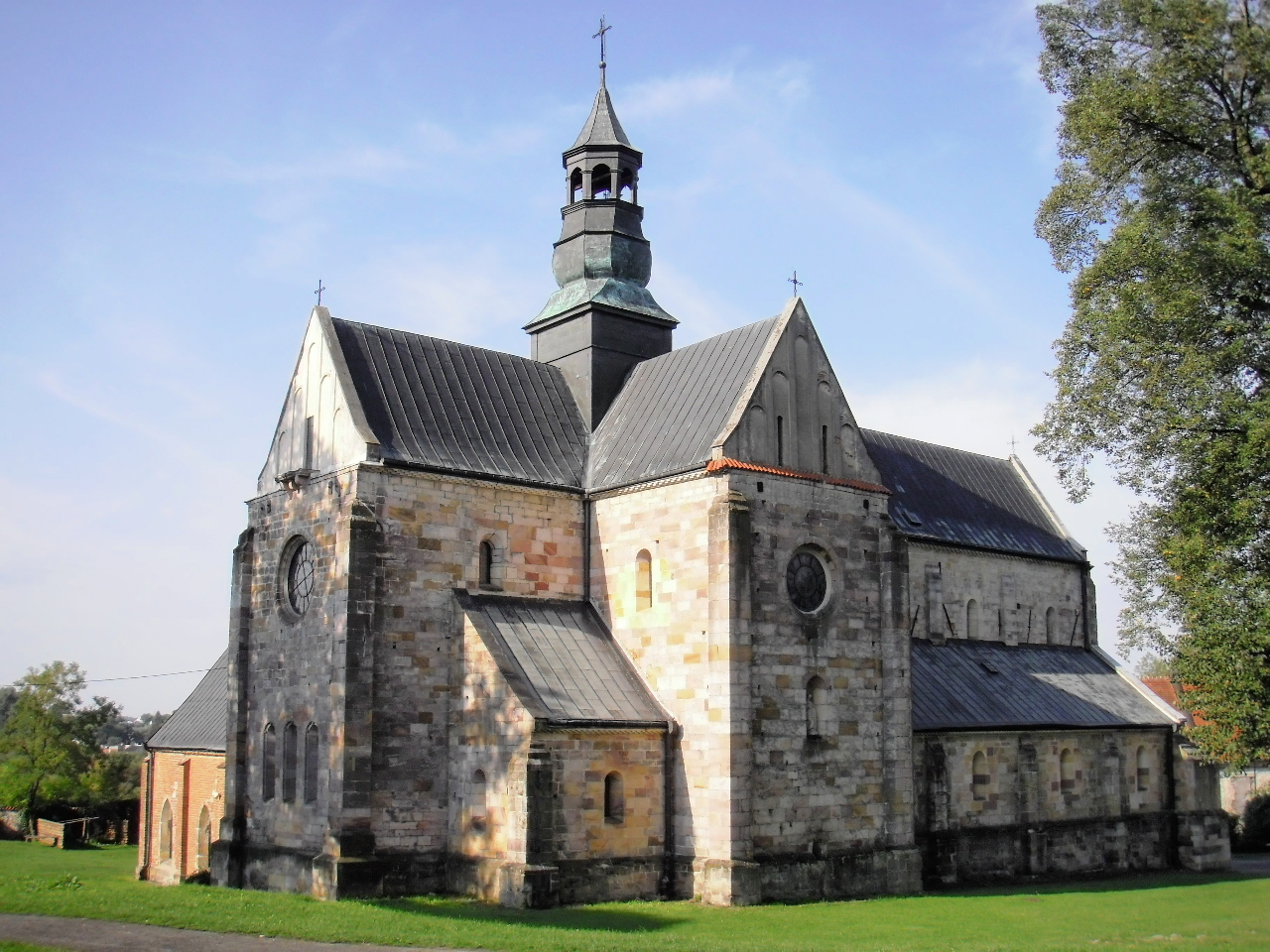
Romanesque Saint Thomas of Canterbury church of the Cistercian Abbey

The origins of Sulejów are associated with a village founded near the crossing of the Pilica river in the 12th century. The castle, which later sparked the development of a Cistercian abbey, was built between 1176 and 1177, on the orders of Duke Casimir II the Just. The abbey was constructed in the place which is now called Podklasztorze. Sulejów received its town rights in the middle of the 13th century, later confirmed by King Władysław I the Elbow-high.

A great event in the history of the town was a rally, which took place between 20 and 23 of June, 1318. This rally was the official ceremony of adopting and enacting the papal conditions and the resumption of the Polish Kingdom. A permission request was sent to Pope John XXII for the coronation of Władysław I the Elbow-high. Later Kuyavian Bishop Gerward was sent to Avignon for negotiations.

Sulejów used to be located on the trade routes between Silesia, Greater Poland and the Kievan Rus'. In 1410 the Cistercian abbey was one of the stopping places for the Polish army, led by King Władysław II Jagiełło. Also Kings Casimir IV Jagiellon and John II Casimir Vasa and several papal legates visited the town. Sulejów was a private church town, administratively located in the Piotrków County in the Sieradz Voivodeship in the Greater Poland Province of the Kingdom of Poland.

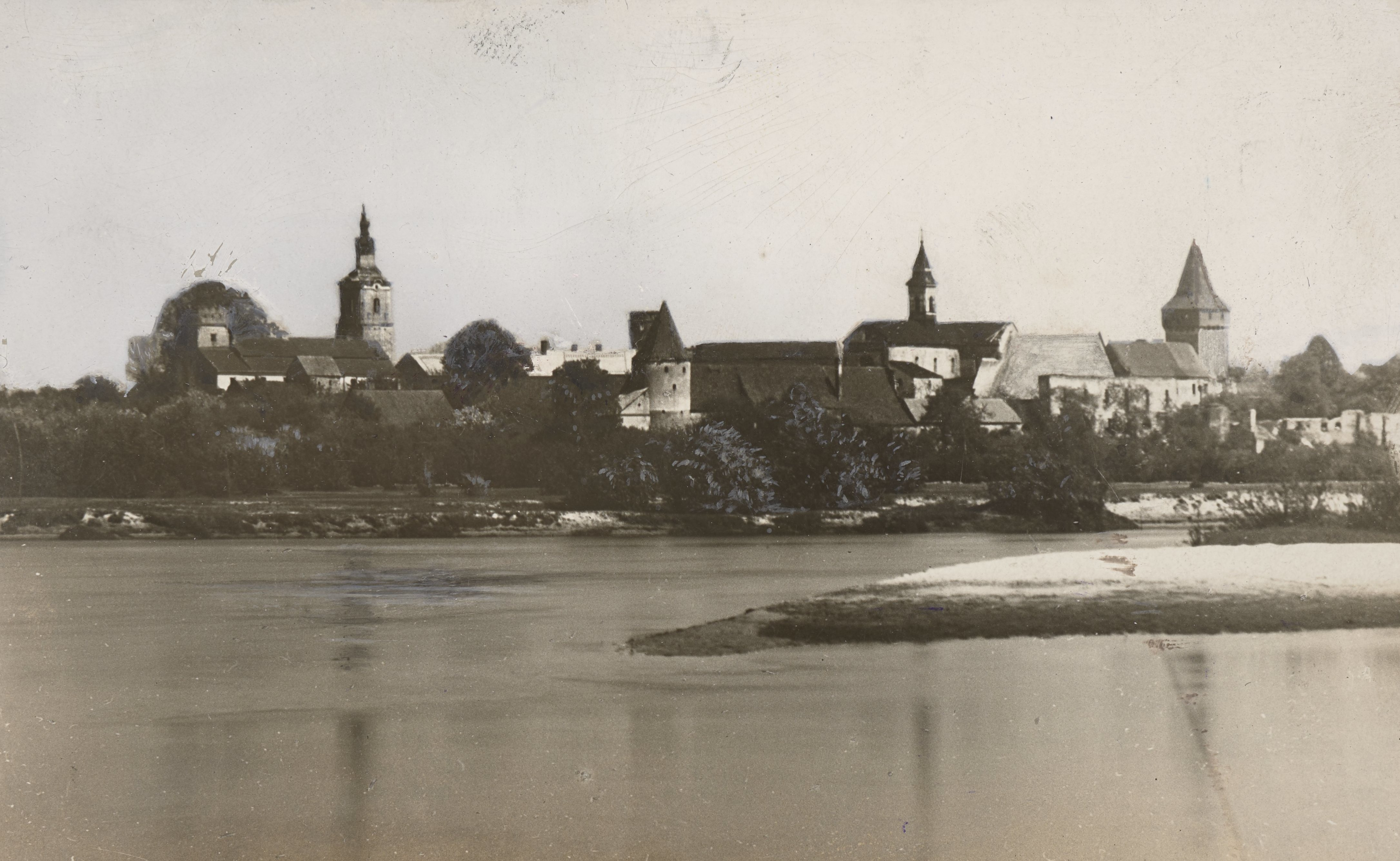
Sulejów in the interbellum

The town was damaged by the Swedes in 1655 during the Deluge, which caused the collapse of the town. As a result of the Third Partition of Poland (1795), the town was divided between Prussia and Austria. In 1807–1809 it was regained by Poles and included within the short-lived Duchy of Warsaw, and in 1815 it fell to the Russian Partition of Poland. In 1819, the Cistercian monastery was closed. During the January Uprising, Polish insurgents and Russian troops clashed in Sulejów on April 4, 1863. In 1870 Sulejów was deprived of its town rights by the Tsarist administration, as one of many towns punished for the Polish January Uprising. After World War I, in 1918, Poland regained independence and control of Sulejów, and in 1927 town rights were restored, which has contributed to the faster development of Sulejów.

Further destruction of the town occurred on 4 September 1939, during the German Luftwaffe bombing in time of the invasion of Poland which started World War II. As a result, 80% of the buildings, including the Old Town, were destroyed. That day almost 1,000 people died. The town then fell under German occupation until 1945. In mid-1940 the German police carried out mass arrests of over 100 Poles, including teachers, judges and students of secret Polish schools.

After World War II, the town was partially rebuilt. From 1975 to 1998 it was located in Piotrków Voivodeship. In 1986 the Cistercians returned to the newly reopened monastery.

== Climate ==
Sulejów has an oceanic climate (Köppen climate classification: Cfb) using the −3 °C (27 °F) isotherm or a humid continental climate (Köppen climate classification: Dfb) using the 0 °C (32 °F) isotherm.

Climate data for Sulejów (1991–2020 normals, extremes 1961–present)
Month	Jan	Feb	Mar	Apr	May	Jun	Jul	Aug	Sep	Oct	Nov	Dec	Year
Record high °C (°F)	14.0 (57.2)	18.1 (64.6)	22.7 (72.9)	29.9 (85.8)	31.2 (88.2)	35.9 (96.6)	36.5 (97.7)	38.0 (100.4)	35.2 (95.4)	26.0 (78.8)	18.8 (65.8)	15.3 (59.5)	38.0 (100.4)
Mean daily maximum °C (°F)	1.1 (34.0)	2.8 (37.0)	7.3 (45.1)	14.4 (57.9)	19.4 (66.9)	22.6 (72.7)	25.2 (77.4)	25.0 (77.0)	19.2 (66.6)	13.2 (55.8)	6.8 (44.2)	2.3 (36.1)	13.3 (55.9)
Daily mean °C (°F)	−1.7 (28.9)	−0.5 (31.1)	2.9 (37.2)	8.7 (47.7)	13.5 (56.3)	16.9 (62.4)	19.0 (66.2)	18.6 (65.5)	13.6 (56.5)	8.5 (47.3)	3.8 (38.8)	−0.2 (31.6)	8.6 (47.5)
Mean daily minimum °C (°F)	−4.3 (24.3)	−3.6 (25.5)	−1.0 (30.2)	3.1 (37.6)	7.7 (45.9)	11.1 (52.0)	13.0 (55.4)	12.6 (54.7)	8.6 (47.5)	4.7 (40.5)	1.0 (33.8)	−2.6 (27.3)	4.2 (39.6)
Record low °C (°F)	−32.2 (−26.0)	−30.6 (−23.1)	−25.1 (−13.2)	−7.2 (19.0)	−3.8 (25.2)	−0.4 (31.3)	0.0 (32.0)	1.7 (35.1)	−3.4 (25.9)	−8.0 (17.6)	−18.2 (−0.8)	−28.3 (−18.9)	−32.2 (−26.0)
Average precipitation mm (inches)	30.6 (1.20)	28.5 (1.12)	34.1 (1.34)	38.5 (1.52)	64.0 (2.52)	73.8 (2.91)	84.6 (3.33)	58.1 (2.29)	50.9 (2.00)	41.8 (1.65)	35.6 (1.40)	32.3 (1.27)	572.8 (22.55)
Average extreme snow depth cm (inches)	7.0 (2.8)	6.4 (2.5)	4.6 (1.8)	1.6 (0.6)	0.1 (0.0)	0.0 (0.0)	0.0 (0.0)	0.0 (0.0)	0.0 (0.0)	0.2 (0.1)	2.3 (0.9)	3.9 (1.5)	7.0 (2.8)
Average precipitation days (≥ 0.1 mm)	16.20	14.24	14.13	12.07	13.83	13.67	14.43	11.97	11.93	13.10	14.45	16.13	166.16
Average snowy days (≥ 0 cm)	15.5	14.7	7.2	1.2	0.0	0.0	0.0	0.0	0.0	0.3	4.2	10.0	53.1
Average relative humidity (%)	86.8	84.1	78.3	70.8	72.3	73.4	72.6	72.3	79.3	84.2	88.6	88.6	79.3
Mean monthly sunshine hours	53.0	71.6	125.5	188.4	243.1	245.7	251.5	244.8	165.1	111.7	53.1	42.0	1,795.4
Source 1: Institute of Meteorology and Water Management
Source 2: Meteomodel.pl (records, relative humidity 1991–2020)

== Demographics ==
Historical population

Year	Pop.	±%
1890	4,027	—
1897	4,636	+15.1%
1910	5,284	+14.0%
1921	5,718	+8.2%
1931	6,387	+11.7%

Year	Pop.	±%
1939	7,048	+10.3%
1950	3,873	−45.0%
1960	4,854	+25.3%
2010	6,418	+32.2%
