= Justynów, Piotrków County =

Justynów
- Village
- Location within Poland
- Coordinates: 51°14′46″N 20°0′29″E
- Country: Poland
- Voivodeship: Łódź
- County: Piotrków
- Gmina: Aleksandrów
- Population: 60

Justynów [jusˈtɨnuf] is a village in the administrative district of Gmina Aleksandrów, within Piotrków County, Łódź Voivodeship, in central Poland.
