= Zalesice, Łódź Voivodeship =

Zalesice
- Village
- Location within Poland
- Coordinates: 51°22′39″N 19°43′10″E
- Country: Poland
- Voivodeship: Łódź
- County: Piotrków
- Gmina: Sulejów

Zalesice [zalɛˈɕit͡sɛ] is a village in the administrative district of Gmina Sulejów, within Piotrków County, Łódź Voivodeship, in central Poland.
