= Gmina Aleksandrów, Łódź Voivodeship =

Gmina Aleksandrów Aleksandrów Commune
- Gmina
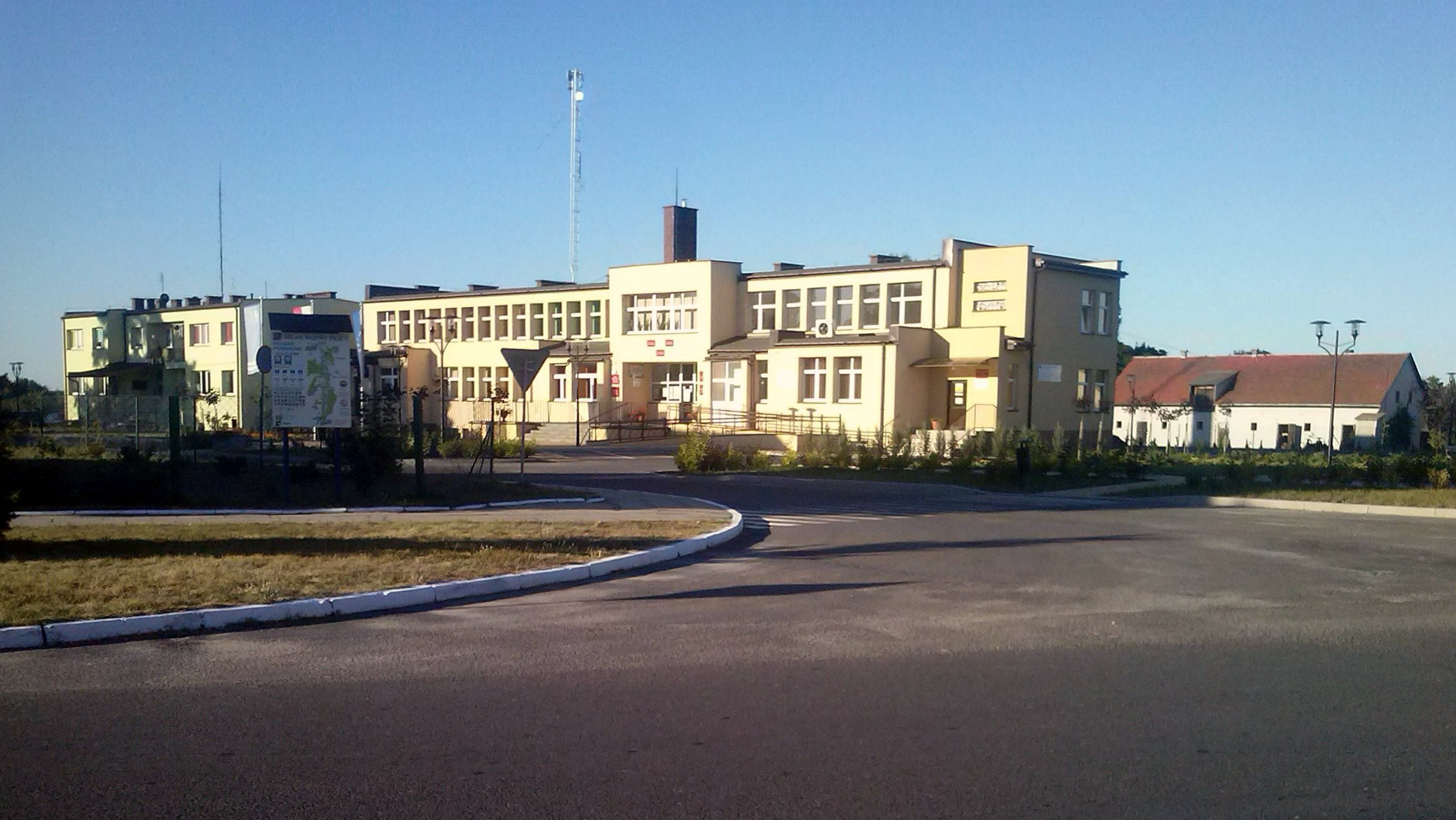
- Seat of the municipality

- Flag Coat of arms
- Interactive map of Gmina Aleksandrów
- Coordinates (Aleksandrów): 51°16′13″N 19°59′14″E
- Country: Poland
- Voivodeship: Łódź
- County: Piotrków County
- Seat: Aleksandrów

Area
  - Total: 144.02 km^{2} (55.61 sq mi)

Population (2006)
  - Total: 4,514
  - Density: 31.34/km^{2} (81.18/sq mi)
- Time zone: UTC+1 (CET)
  - Summer (DST): UTC+2 (CEST)
- Website: aleksandrow.net.pl/bip

Gmina Aleksandrów is a rural gmina (administrative district) in Piotrków County, Łódź Voivodeship, in central Poland. Its seat is the village of Aleksandrów, which lies approximately 26 kilometres (16 mi) south-east of Piotrków Trybunalski and 68 km (42 mi) south-east of the regional capital Łódź.

The gmina covers an area of 144.02 square kilometres (55.6 sq mi), and as of 2006 its total population is 4,514.

== Villages ==
The gmina contains the following villages having the status of sołectwo:

- Aleksandrów
- Borowiec
- Brzezie
- Ciechomin
- Dąbrowa nad Czarną
- Dąbrówka
- Dębowa Góra
- Dębowa Góra-Kolonia
- Jaksonek
- Janikowice
- Justynów
- Kalinków
- Kamocka Wola
- Kawęczyn
- Kotuszów
- Marianów
- Niewierszyn
- Nowy Reczków
- Ostrów
- Rożenek
- Sieczka
- Siucice
- Siucice-Kolonia
- Skotniki
- Stara
- Stara Kolonia
- Szarbsko
- Taraska
- Wacławów
- Włodzimierzów
- Wolica
- Wólka Skotnicka

== Neighbouring gminas ==
Gmina Aleksandrów is bordered by the gminas of Mniszków, Paradyż, Przedbórz, Ręczno, Sulejów and Żarnów.
