= Łęczno, Łódź Voivodeship =

Łęczno
- Village
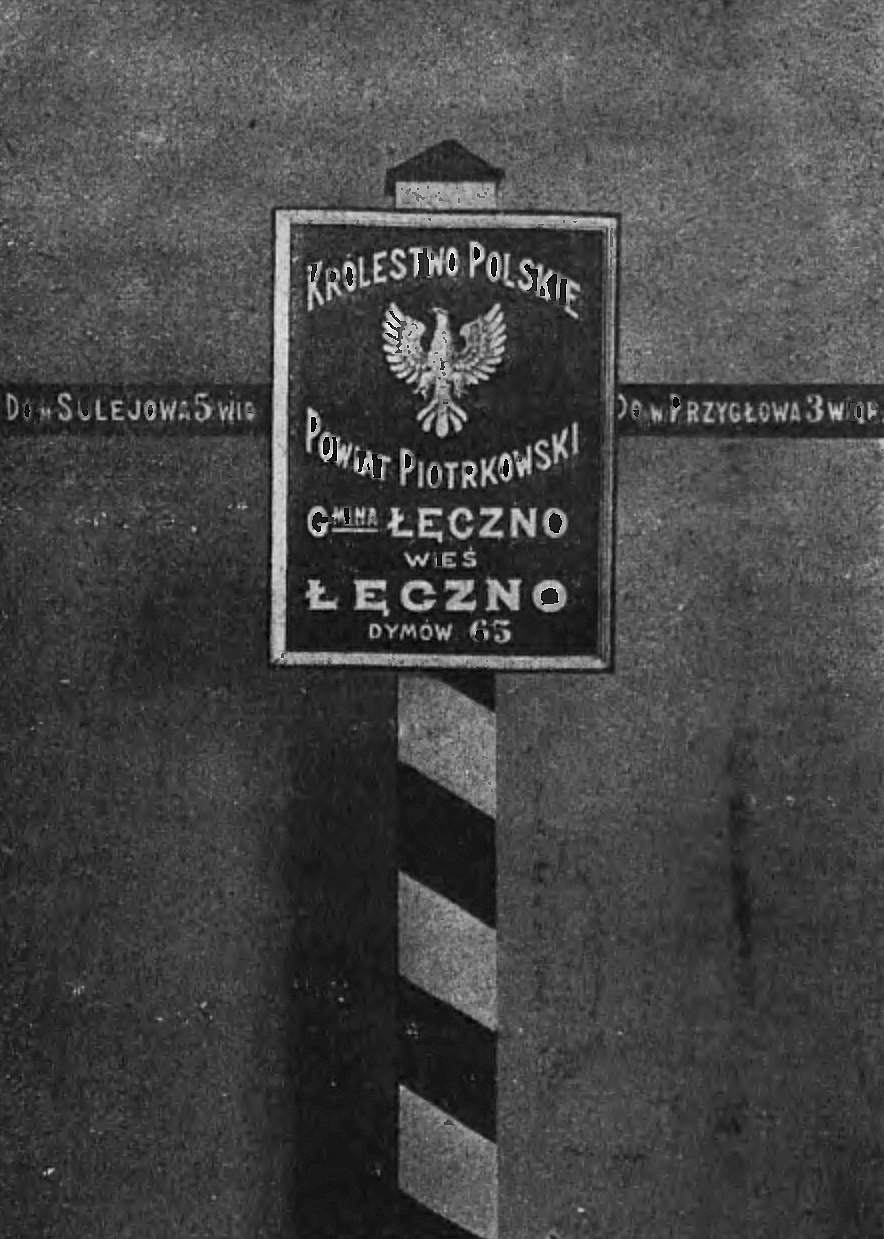

- Location within Poland
- Coordinates: 51°20′N 19°51′E
- Country: Poland
- Voivodeship: Łódź
- County: Piotrków
- Gmina: Sulejów

Łęczno [ˈwɛnt͡ʂnɔ] is a village in the administrative district of Gmina Sulejów, within Piotrków County, Łódź Voivodeship, in central Poland.
