= Barkowice Mokre =

- Village
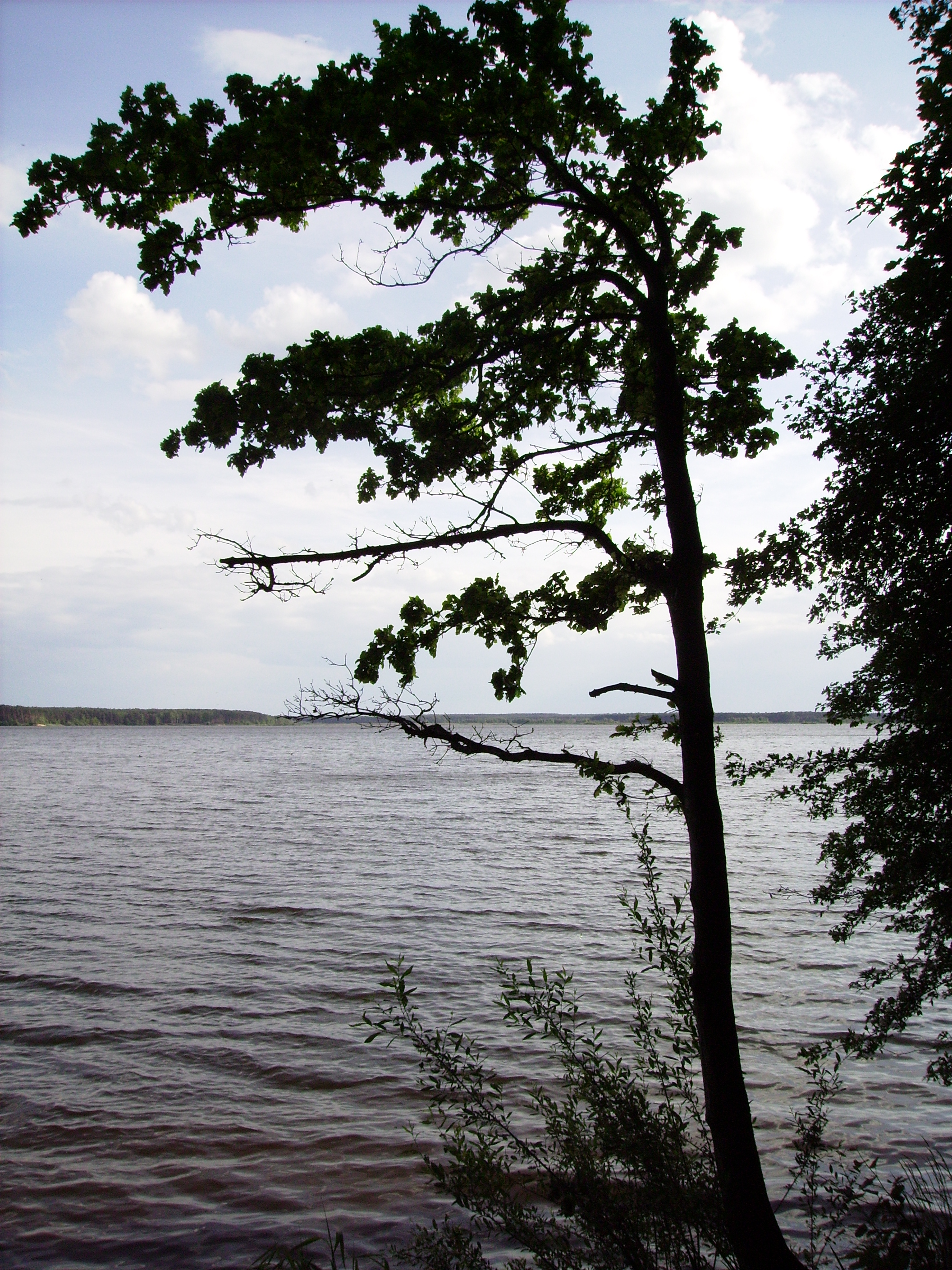

- Location within Poland
- Coordinates: 51°25′N 19°53′E
- Country: Poland
- Voivodeship: Łódź
- County: Piotrków
- Gmina: Sulejów
- Population: 130

Barkowice Mokre [barkɔˈvit͡sɛ ˈmɔkrɛ] is a village in the administrative district of Gmina Sulejów, within Piotrków County, Łódź Voivodeship, in central Poland.
