= Korytnica, Łódź Voivodeship =

Korytnica
- Village
- Location within Poland
- Coordinates: 51°23′N 19°48′E
- Country: Poland
- Voivodeship: Łódź
- County: Piotrków
- Gmina: Sulejów

Korytnica [kɔrɨtˈnit͡sa] is a village in the administrative district of Gmina Sulejów, within Piotrków County, Łódź Voivodeship, in central Poland.
