= Janikowice, Łódź Voivodeship =

Janikowice
- Village
- Location within Poland
- Coordinates: 51°15′26″N 19°59′27″E
- Country: Poland
- Voivodeship: Łódź
- County: Piotrków
- Gmina: Aleksandrów
- Population: 200

Janikowice [janikɔˈvit͡sɛ] is a village in the administrative district of Gmina Aleksandrów, within Piotrków County, Łódź Voivodeship, in central Poland.
