= Kurnędz =

- Village
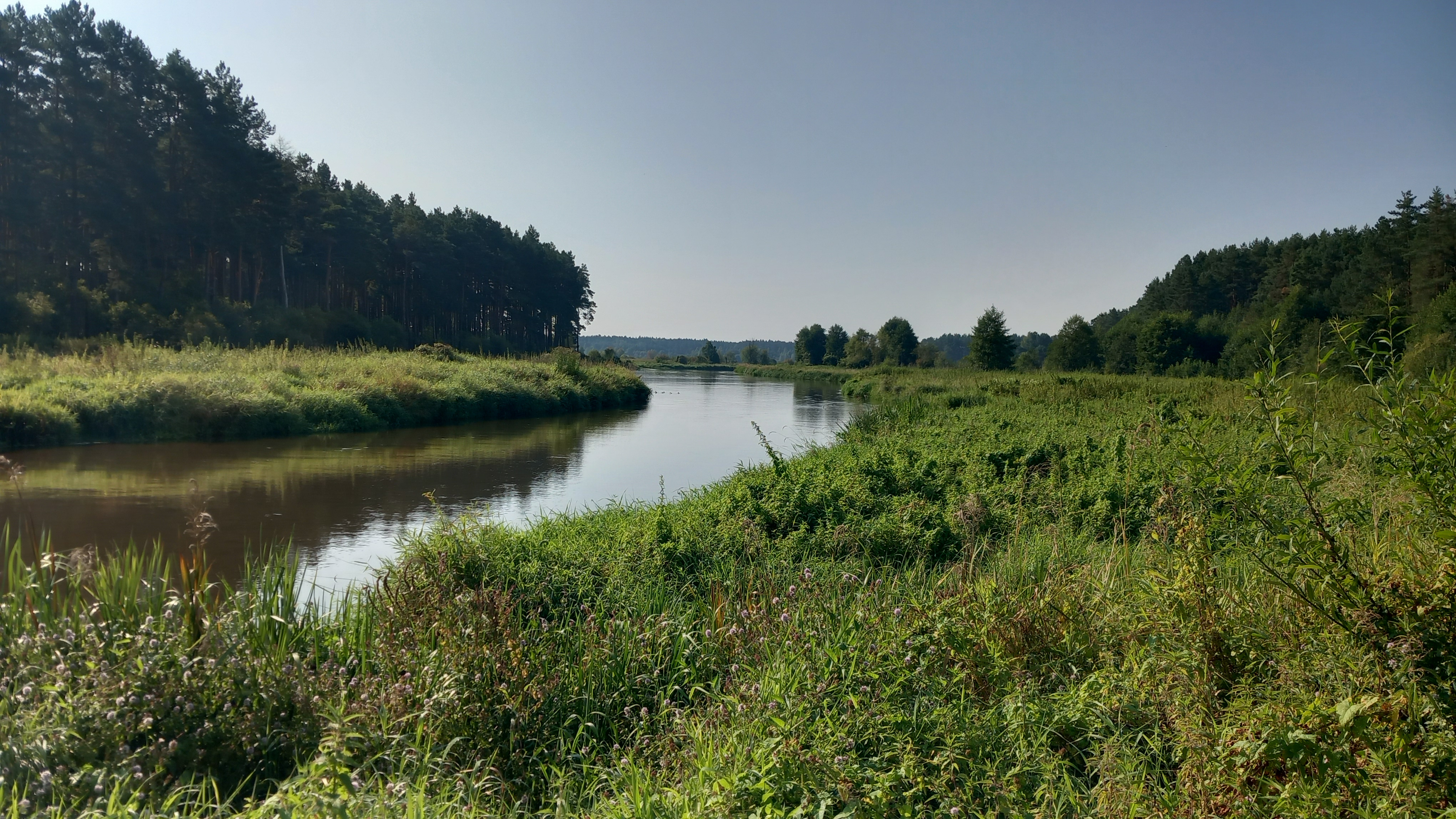

- Location within Poland
- Coordinates: 51°20′N 19°53′E
- Country: Poland
- Voivodeship: Łódź
- County: Piotrków
- Gmina: Sulejów

Kurnędz [ˈkurnɛnt͡s] is a village in the administrative district of Gmina Sulejów, within Piotrków County, Łódź Voivodeship, in central Poland.
