= Kałek, Łódź Voivodeship =

Kałek
- Village
- Location within Poland
- Coordinates: 51°22′N 19°48′E
- Country: Poland
- Voivodeship: Łódź
- County: Piotrków
- Gmina: Sulejów

Kałek [ˈkawɛk] is a village in the administrative district of Gmina Sulejów, within Piotrków County, Łódź Voivodeship, in central Poland.
