= Bronowski (surname) =

Bronowski is a surname. Notable people with the surname include:

- Alfred Bronowski, a pen name of Alfred Szklarski, an author of youth literature
- Jacob Bronowski (1908–1974), Polish-British mathematician, biologist, and historian of science
- Lisa Jardine (née Bronowski) (1944–2015), British historian

== See also ==
- Bronów (disambiguation)
- Bronowo (disambiguation)
- Bronowice (disambiguation)
