= Myślibórz (disambiguation) =

Myślibórz is a city in West Pomeranian Voivodeship (north-west Poland).

Myślibórz may also refer to:

- Myślibórz, Lower Silesian Voivodeship (south-west Poland)
- Myślibórz, Łódź Voivodeship (central Poland)
- Myślibórz, Greater Poland Voivodeship (west-central Poland)

== See also ==
- Mysliboř
