= Nadole =

Nadole may refer to the following places:

- Nadole, Łódź Voivodeship (central Poland)
- Nadole, Pomeranian Voivodeship (north Poland)
- Nadole, Subcarpathian Voivodeship (southeast Poland)
- Nadole, Žetale, a settlement in the Municipality of Žetale in eastern Slovenia
