= Antoniów, Gmina Żarnów =

Antoniów
- Village
- Location within Poland
- Coordinates: 51°12′49″N 20°10′24″E
- Country: Poland
- Voivodeship: Łódź
- County: Opoczno
- Gmina: Żarnów

Antoniów [anˈtɔɲuf] is a village in the administrative district of Gmina Żarnów, within Opoczno County, Łódź Voivodeship, in central Poland.
