= Chełsty =

Chełsty may refer to the following places:

- Chełsty, Łódź Voivodeship (central Poland)
- Chełsty, Masovian Voivodeship (east-central Poland)
- Chełsty, Warmian-Masurian Voivodeship (north Poland)
