= Dęba, Opoczno County =

Dęba
- Village
- Location within Poland
- Coordinates: 51°28′20″N 20°16′0″E
- Country: Poland
- Voivodeship: Łódź
- County: Opoczno
- Gmina: Poświętne

Dęba [ˈdɛmba] is a village in the administrative district of Gmina Poświętne, within Opoczno County, Łódź Voivodeship, in central Poland.
