= Straszowa Wola =

- Village
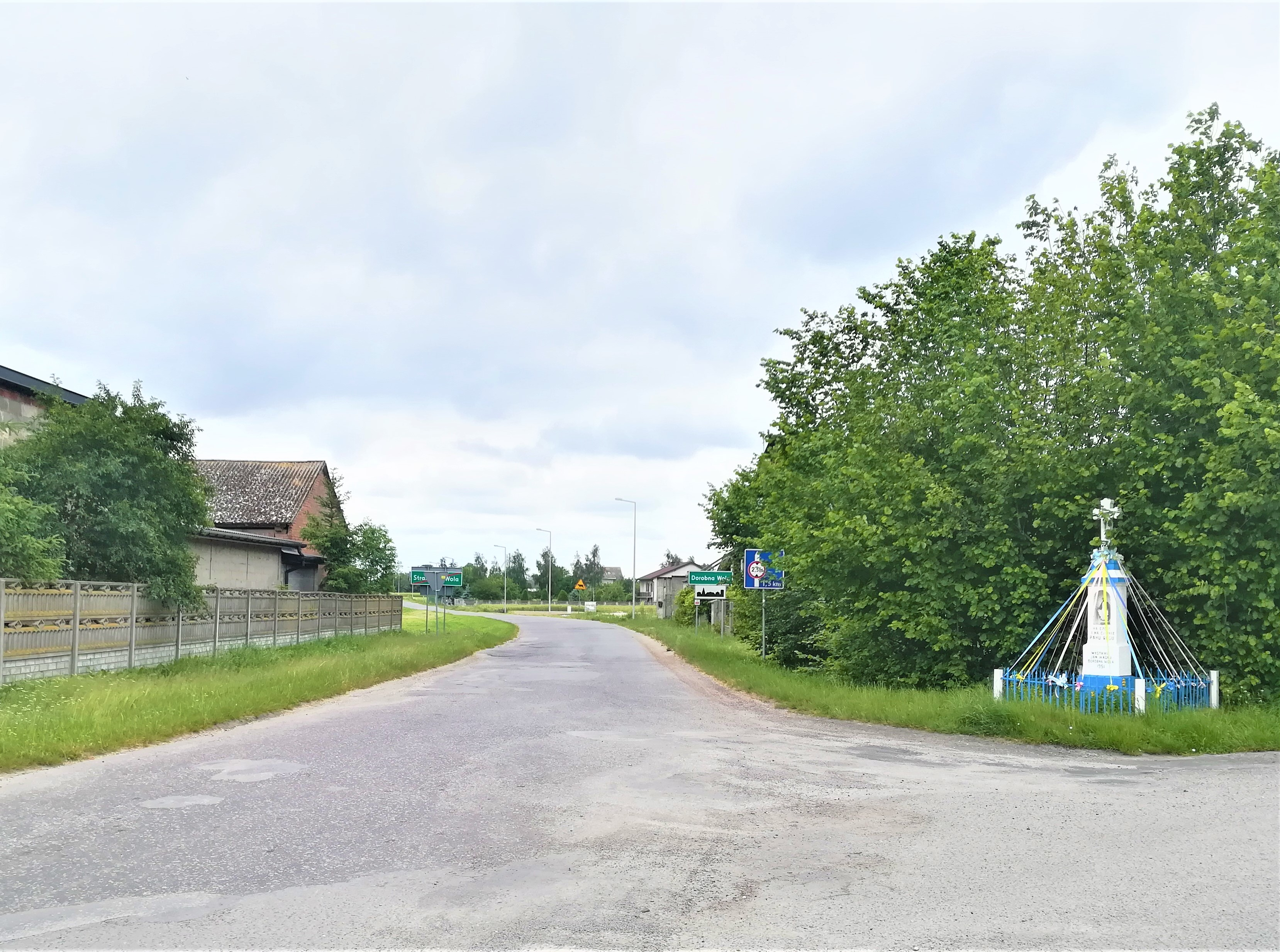

- Location within Poland
- Coordinates: 51°18′N 20°12′E
- Country: Poland
- Voivodeship: Łódź
- County: Opoczno
- Gmina: Żarnów

Straszowa Wola [straˈʂɔva ˈvɔla] is a village in the administrative district of Gmina Żarnów, within Opoczno County, Łódź Voivodeship, in central Poland.
