= Marcinków =

Marcinków may refer to the following places in Poland:

- Marcinków, Lower Silesian Voivodeship (south-west Poland)
- Marcinków, Łódź Voivodeship (central Poland)
- Marcinków, Silesian Voivodeship (south Poland)
- Marcinków, Świętokrzyskie Voivodeship (south-central Poland)
