= Ponikła =

Ponikła may refer to the following places in Poland:

- Ponikła, Łódź Voivodeship (central Poland)
- Ponikła, Podlaskie Voivodeship (north-east Poland)
- Ponikła, Pomeranian Voivodeship (north Poland)

== See also ==
- Poniklá, a village and municipality in the Semily District in the Liberec Region of the Czech Republic
