= Irenów =

Village in central Poland

- Village
- Location within Poland
- Coordinates: 51°19′N 20°4′E
- Country: Poland
- Voivodeship: Łódź
- County: Opoczno
- Gmina: Paradyż

Irenów [iˈrɛnuf] is a village in the administrative district of Gmina Paradyż, within Opoczno County, Łódź Voivodeship, in central Poland.
