= Ryszard Robakiewicz =

Polish footballer (born 1962)

Personal information
- Full name: Ryszard Stanisław Robakiewicz
- Date of birth: 5 June 1962 (age 64)
- Place of birth: Mysiakowiec, Poland
- Height: 1.85 m (6 ft 1 in)
- Position: Forward

Team information
- Current team: Poland (women) (assistant)

Youth career
- ChKS Łódź

Senior career*
Years	Team	Apps	(Gls)
1981–1982	Włókniarz Pabianice		
1982–1988	ŁKS Łódź	160	(48)
1988–1989	Legia Warsaw	22	(5)
1989–1994	VfB Mödling	85	(21)

International career
1987–1988	Poland	3	(0)

Managerial career
- 2025: ŁKS Łódź (interim)
- * Club domestic league appearances and goals

Ryszard Stanisław Robakiewicz (born 5 June 1962) is a Polish former professional footballer who played as a forward. He currently serves as an assistant coach of the Poland women's national team. He made three appearances for the senior national team from 1987 to 1988.

== Managerial statistics ==
As of match played 25 May 2025

Managerial record by team and tenure
Team	From	To	Record							
Team	From	To	G	W	D	L	GF	GA	GD	Win %
ŁKS Łódź (interim)	24 April 2025	31 May 2025	5	4	0	1	12	4	+8	80.00
Total			5	4	0	1	12	4	+8	80.00

== Honours ==
Legia Warsaw

- Polish Cup: 1988–89
