= Stawowice =

- Village
- Location within Poland
- Coordinates: 51°18′12″N 20°10′5″E
- Country: Poland
- Voivodeship: Łódź
- County: Opoczno
- Gmina: Paradyż

Stawowice [stavɔˈvit͡sɛ] is a village in the administrative district of Gmina Paradyż, within Opoczno County, Łódź Voivodeship, in central Poland.
