= Popławy-Kolonia =

- Village
- Location within Poland
- Coordinates: 51°20′26″N 20°06′30″E
- Country: Poland
- Voivodeship: Łódź
- County: Opoczno
- Gmina: Paradyż

Popławy-Kolonia [pɔˈpwavɨ kɔˈlɔɲa] is a village in the administrative district of Gmina Paradyż, within Opoczno County, Łódź Voivodeship, in central Poland.
