= Nowa Góra =

Nowa Góra ("new mountain") may refer to the following places in Poland:

- Nowa Góra, Lesser Poland Voivodeship (south Poland)
- Nowa Góra, Łódź Voivodeship (central Poland)
- Nowa Góra, Masovian Voivodeship (east-central Poland)
- Nowa Góra (mountain)
