= Adamów, Gmina Paradyż =

Adamów
- Village
- Location within Poland
- Coordinates: 51°16′59″N 20°6′4″E
- Country: Poland
- Voivodeship: Łódź
- County: Opoczno
- Gmina: Paradyż

Adamów [aˈdamuf] is a village in the administrative district of Gmina Paradyż, within Opoczno County, Łódź Voivodeship, in central Poland.
