= Dęborzeczka =

- Village
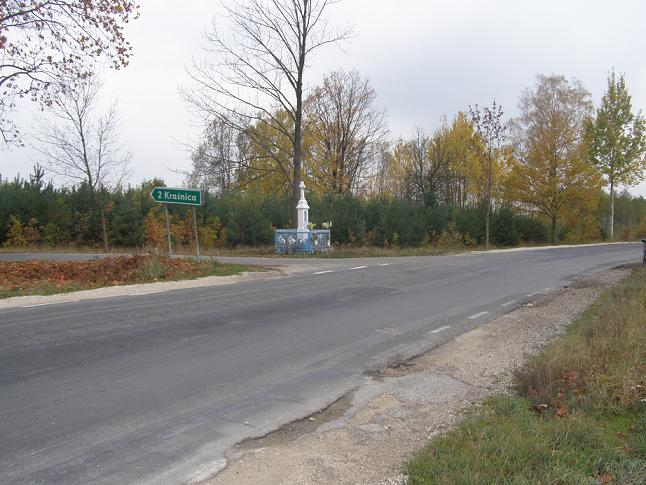

- Location within Poland
- Coordinates: 51°28′N 20°15′E
- Country: Poland
- Voivodeship: Łódź
- County: Opoczno
- Gmina: Poświętne

Dęborzeczka [dɛmbɔˈʐɛt͡ʂka] is a village in the administrative district of Gmina Poświętne, within Opoczno County, Łódź Voivodeship, in central Poland.
