= Adamów, Gmina Żarnów =

Adamów
- Village
- Location within Poland
- Coordinates: 51°11′42″N 20°8′49″E
- Country: Poland
- Voivodeship: Łódź
- County: Opoczno
- Gmina: Żarnów
- Time zone: UTC+1 (CET)
  - Summer (DST): UTC+2 (CEST)
- Postal code: 26-330
- Vehicle registration: EOP

Adamów [aˈdamuf] is a village in the administrative district of Gmina Żarnów, within Opoczno County, Łódź Voivodeship, in central Poland.

In the interwar period, it was administratively located in Gmina Machory in the Opoczno County in the Kielce Voivodeship of Poland. According to the 1921 census, Adamów had a population of 129, entirely Polish by nationality and Roman Catholic by confession.
