= Klew =

- Village
- Location within Poland
- Coordinates: 51°13′N 20°3′E
- Country: Poland
- Voivodeship: Łódź
- County: Opoczno
- Gmina: Żarnów

Klew [klɛf] is a village in the administrative district of Gmina Żarnów, within Opoczno County, Łódź Voivodeship, in central Poland.
