= Brudzewice-Kolonia =

- Village
- Location within Poland
- Coordinates: 51°32′25″N 20°24′36″E
- Country: Poland
- Voivodeship: Łódź
- County: Opoczno
- Gmina: Poświętne

Brudzewice-Kolonia [brud͡zɛˈvit͡sɛ kɔˈlɔɲa] is a village in the administrative district of Gmina Poświętne, within Opoczno County, Łódź Voivodeship, in central Poland.
