= Stawowice-Kolonia =

- Village
- Location within Poland
- Coordinates: 51°18′43″N 20°10′14″E
- Country: Poland
- Voivodeship: Łódź
- County: Opoczno
- Gmina: Paradyż

Stawowice-Kolonia [stavɔˈvit͡sɛ kɔˈlɔɲa] is a village in the administrative district of Gmina Paradyż, within Opoczno County, Łódź Voivodeship, in central Poland.
