= Alfonsów, Opoczno County =

Alfonsów
- Village
- Location within Poland
- Coordinates: 51°20′N 20°8′E
- Country: Poland
- Voivodeship: Łódź
- County: Opoczno
- Gmina: Paradyż

Alfonsów [alˈfɔnsuf] is a village in the administrative district of Gmina Paradyż, within Opoczno County, Łódź Voivodeship, in central Poland.
