= Łysa Góra, Łódź Voivodeship =

Łysa Góra
- Village
- Location within Poland
- Coordinates: 51°13′27″N 20°10′59″E
- Country: Poland
- Voivodeship: Łódź
- County: Opoczno
- Gmina: Żarnów
- Population: 50

Łysa Góra [ˈwɨsa ˈɡura] is a village in the administrative district of Gmina Żarnów, within Opoczno County, Łódź Voivodeship, in central Poland.
