= Niemojowice-Kolonia =

- Village
- Location within Poland
- Coordinates: 51°15′36″N 20°13′12″E
- Country: Poland
- Voivodeship: Łódź
- County: Opoczno
- Gmina: Żarnów
- Population: 90

Niemojowice-Kolonia [ɲɛmɔjɔˈvit͡sɛ kɔˈlɔɲa] is a village in the administrative district of Gmina Żarnów, within Opoczno County, Łódź Voivodeship, in central Poland.
