= Ławki, Łódź Voivodeship =

Ławki
- Village
- Location within Poland
- Coordinates: 51°12′31″N 20°03′58″E
- Country: Poland
- Voivodeship: Łódź
- County: Opoczno
- Gmina: Żarnów

Ławki [ˈwafki] is a village in the administrative district of Gmina Żarnów, within Opoczno County, Łódź Voivodeship, in central Poland.
