= Wójcin, Opoczno County =

Wójcin
- Village
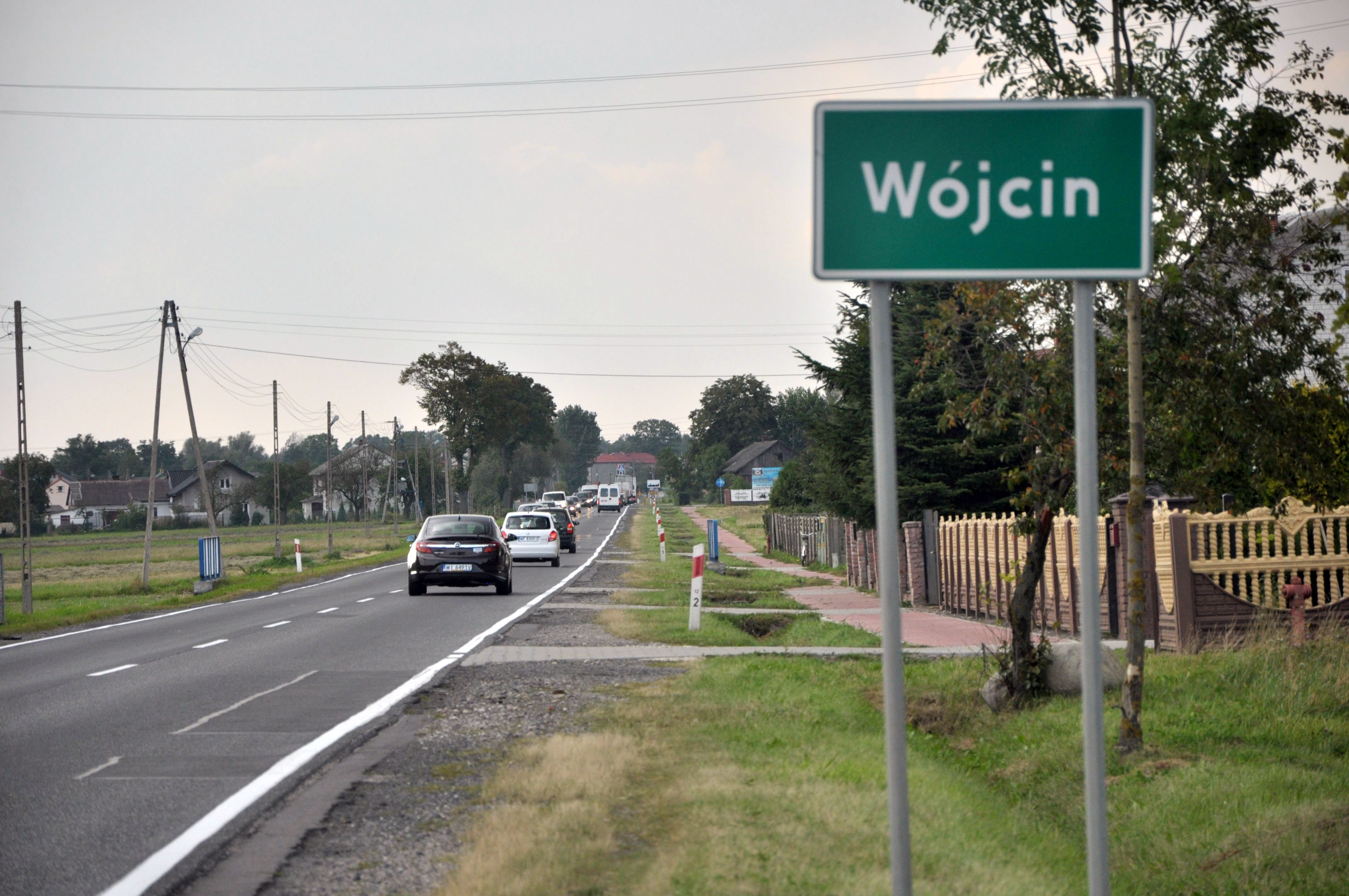

- Location within Poland
- Coordinates: 51°20′N 20°2′E
- Country: Poland
- Voivodeship: Łódź
- County: Opoczno
- Gmina: Paradyż

Wójcin [ˈvui̯t͡ɕin] is a village in the administrative district of Gmina Paradyż, within Opoczno County, Łódź Voivodeship, in central Poland.
