= Gmina Poświętne =

Gmina Poświętne may refer to any of the following rural administrative districts in Poland:

- Gmina Poświętne, Podlaskie Voivodeship
- Gmina Poświętne, Łódź Voivodeship
- Gmina Poświętne, Masovian Voivodeship
