= Sielec, Gmina Żarnów =

Village in Gmina Żarnów, Poland

Sielec
- Village
- Location within Poland
- Coordinates: 51°13′49″N 20°09′50″E
- Country: Poland
- Voivodeship: Łódź
- County: Opoczno
- Gmina: Żarnów

Sielec [ˈɕɛlɛt͡s] is a village in the administrative district of Gmina Żarnów, within Opoczno County, Łódź Voivodeship, in central Poland.
