= Wójcin A =

- Village
- Location within Poland
- Coordinates: 51°19′54″N 20°01′45″E
- Country: Poland
- Voivodeship: Łódź
- County: Opoczno
- Gmina: Paradyż

Wójcin A is a village in the administrative district of Gmina Paradyż, within Opoczno County, Łódź Voivodeship, in central Poland.
