= Przyłęk =

Przyłęk may refer to the following places in Poland:

- Przyłęk, Lower Silesian Voivodeship (south-west Poland)
- Przyłęk, Łódź Voivodeship (central Poland)
- Przyłęk, Świętokrzyskie Voivodeship (south-central Poland)
- Przyłęk, Subcarpathian Voivodeship (south-east Poland)
- Przyłęk, Garwolin County in Masovian Voivodeship (east-central Poland)
- Przyłęk, Zwoleń County in Masovian Voivodeship (east-central Poland)
- Przyłęk, Greater Poland Voivodeship (west-central Poland)
- Przyłęk, Silesian Voivodeship (south Poland)
