= Fryszerka, Opoczno County =

Fryszerka
- Settlement
- Location within Poland
- Coordinates: 51°33′34″N 20°18′43″E
- Country: Poland
- Voivodeship: Łódź
- County: Opoczno
- Gmina: Poświętne

Fryszerka [frɨˈʂɛrka] is a settlement in the administrative district of Gmina Poświętne, within Opoczno County, Łódź Voivodeship, in central Poland.
