= Studzianna, Łódź Voivodeship =

Studzianna
- Village
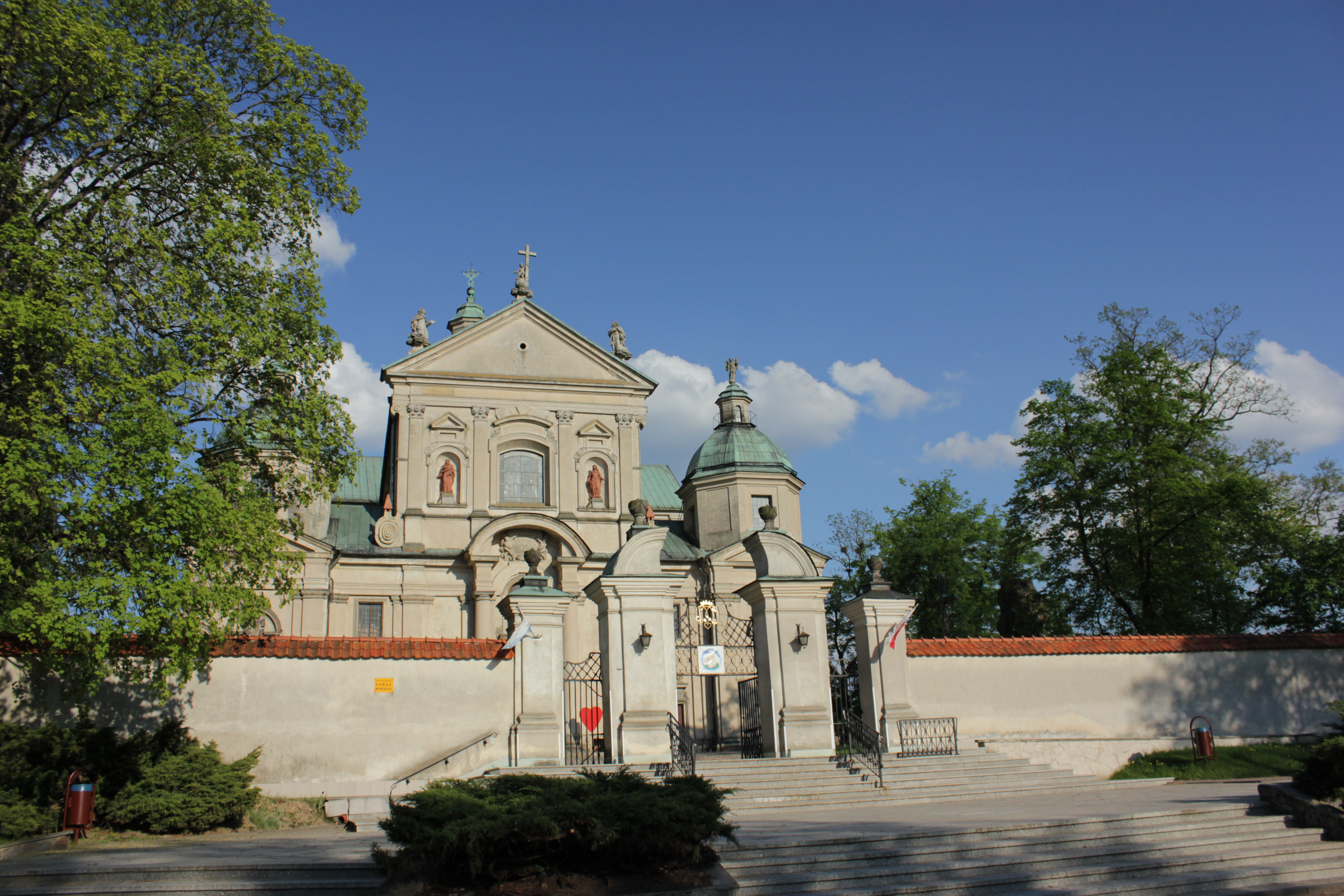
- Basilica

- Location within Poland
- Coordinates: 51°31′26″N 20°20′50″E
- Country: Poland
- Voivodeship: Łódź
- County: Opoczno
- Gmina: Poświętne
- Population: 270

Studzianna [stuˈd͡ʑanna] is a village in the administrative district of Gmina Poświętne, within Opoczno County, Łódź Voivodeship, in central Poland.
