= Stanisławów, Opoczno County =

Stanisławów
- Village
- Location within Poland
- Coordinates: 51°16′49″N 20°07′12″E
- Country: Poland
- Voivodeship: Łódź
- County: Opoczno
- Gmina: Paradyż

Stanisławów [staniˈswavuf] is a village in the administrative district of Gmina Paradyż, Opoczno County, Łódź Voivodeship, in central Poland.
