= Kozłowiec, Łódź Voivodeship =

Kozłowiec
- Village
- Location within Poland
- Coordinates: 51°33′08″N 20°18′08″E
- Country: Poland
- Voivodeship: Łódź
- County: Opoczno
- Gmina: Poświętne

Kozłowiec [kɔˈzwɔvjɛt͡s] is a village in the administrative district of Gmina Poświętne, within Opoczno County, Łódź Voivodeship, in central Poland.
