= Wierzchowisko =

Wierzchowisko may refer to the following places:

- Wierzchowisko, Lesser Poland Voivodeship (south Poland)
- Wierzchowisko, Łódź Voivodeship (central Poland)
- Wierzchowisko, Silesian Voivodeship (south Poland)
