= Podgaj, Łódź Voivodeship =

Podgaj
- Village
- Location within Poland
- Coordinates: 51°18′50″N 20°03′03″E
- Country: Poland
- Voivodeship: Łódź
- County: Opoczno
- Gmina: Paradyż

Podgaj [ˈpɔdɡai̯] is a village in the administrative district of Gmina Paradyż, within Opoczno County, Łódź Voivodeship, in central Poland.
