= Gapinin-Kolonia =

- Village
- Location within Poland
- Coordinates: 51°35′03″N 20°24′08″E
- Country: Poland
- Voivodeship: Łódź
- County: Opoczno
- Gmina: Poświętne

Gapinin-Kolonia [ɡaˈpinin kɔˈlɔɲa] is a village in the administrative district of Gmina Poświętne, within Opoczno County, Łódź Voivodeship, in central Poland.
