= Feliksów, Opoczno County =

Feliksów
- Village
- Location within Poland
- Coordinates: 51°19′N 20°6′E
- Country: Poland
- Voivodeship: Łódź
- County: Opoczno
- Gmina: Paradyż

Feliksów (Polish pronunciation: [fɛˈliksuf]) is a village in the administrative district of Gmina Paradyż, within Opoczno County, Łódź Voivodeship, in central Poland.
