= Malków =

Village in Gmina Żarnów, Poland

- Village
- Location within Poland
- Coordinates: 51°12′59″N 20°14′38″E
- Country: Poland
- Voivodeship: Łódź
- County: Opoczno
- Gmina: Żarnów

Malków [ˈmalkuf] is a village in the administrative district of Gmina Żarnów, within Opoczno County, Łódź Voivodeship, in central Poland.
