= Zdyszewice =

- Village
- Location within Poland
- Coordinates: 51°15′N 20°6′E
- Country: Poland
- Voivodeship: Łódź
- County: Opoczno
- Gmina: Żarnów

Zdyszewice [zdɨʂɛˈvit͡sɛ] is a village in the administrative district of Gmina Żarnów, within Opoczno County, Łódź Voivodeship, in central Poland.
