= Topolice =

Topolice may refer to the following places in Poland:

- Topolice, Lower Silesian Voivodeship (south-west Poland)
- Topolice, Łódź Voivodeship (central Poland)
