= Wójcin B =

- Village
- Location within Poland
- Coordinates: 51°19′40″N 20°02′18″E
- Country: Poland
- Voivodeship: Łódź
- County: Opoczno
- Gmina: Paradyż

Wójcin B is a village in the administrative district of Gmina Paradyż, within Opoczno County, Łódź Voivodeship, in central Poland.
