= Małoszyce =

Małoszyce may refer to the following places:

- Małoszyce, Łódź Voivodeship (central Poland)
- Małoszyce, Silesian Voivodeship (south Poland)
- Małoszyce, Świętokrzyskie Voivodeship (south-central Poland)
- Małoszyce, Pomeranian Voivodeship (north Poland)
