= Ruszenice-Kolonia =

- Village
- Location within Poland
- Coordinates: 51°12′54″N 20°03′53″E
- Country: Poland
- Voivodeship: Łódź
- County: Opoczno
- Gmina: Żarnów

Ruszenice-Kolonia [ruʂɛˈnit͡sɛ kɔˈlɔɲa] is a village in the administrative district of Gmina Żarnów, within Opoczno County, Łódź Voivodeship, in central Poland.
