= Tomaszów, Opoczno County =

Tomaszów
- Village
- Location within Poland
- Coordinates: 51°13′N 20°7′E
- Country: Poland
- Voivodeship: Łódź
- County: Opoczno
- Gmina: Żarnów

Tomaszów [tɔˈmaʂuf] is a village in the administrative district of Gmina Żarnów, within Opoczno County, Łódź Voivodeship, in central Poland.
