= Murowana =

Murowana may refer to the following places in Poland:

- Murowana Goślina
- Garlica Murowana
- Lipnica Murowana
- Miedzna Murowana
- Wola Murowana
