= Wielka Wola, Opoczno County =

Wielka Wola
- Village
- Location within Poland
- Coordinates: 51°19′N 20°8′E
- Country: Poland
- Voivodeship: Łódź
- County: Opoczno
- Gmina: Paradyż

Wielka Wola [ˈvjɛlka ˈvɔla] is a village in the administrative district of Gmina Paradyż, within Opoczno County, Łódź Voivodeship, in central Poland.
