= Budków, Opoczno County =

Budków
- Village
- Location within Poland
- Coordinates: 51°17′N 20°9′E
- Country: Poland
- Voivodeship: Łódź
- County: Opoczno
- Gmina: Żarnów

Budków [ˈbutkuf] is a village in the administrative district of Gmina Żarnów, within Opoczno County, Łódź Voivodeship, in central Poland.
