= Kamieniec, Łódź Voivodeship =

Kamieniec
- Village
- Location within Poland
- Coordinates: 51°12′37″N 20°06′56″E
- Country: Poland
- Voivodeship: Łódź
- County: Opoczno
- Gmina: Żarnów

Kamieniec [kaˈmjɛɲɛt͡s] is a village in the administrative district of Gmina Żarnów, within Opoczno County, Łódź Voivodeship, in central Poland.
