= Malenie, Opoczno County =

Malenie
- Village
- Location within Poland
- Coordinates: 51°11′48″N 20°07′09″E
- Country: Poland
- Voivodeship: Łódź
- County: Opoczno
- Gmina: Żarnów

Malenie [maˈlɛɲɛ] is a village in the administrative district of Gmina Żarnów, within Opoczno County, Łódź Voivodeship, in central Poland.
