= Paradyż, Opoczno County =

Paradyż
- Village
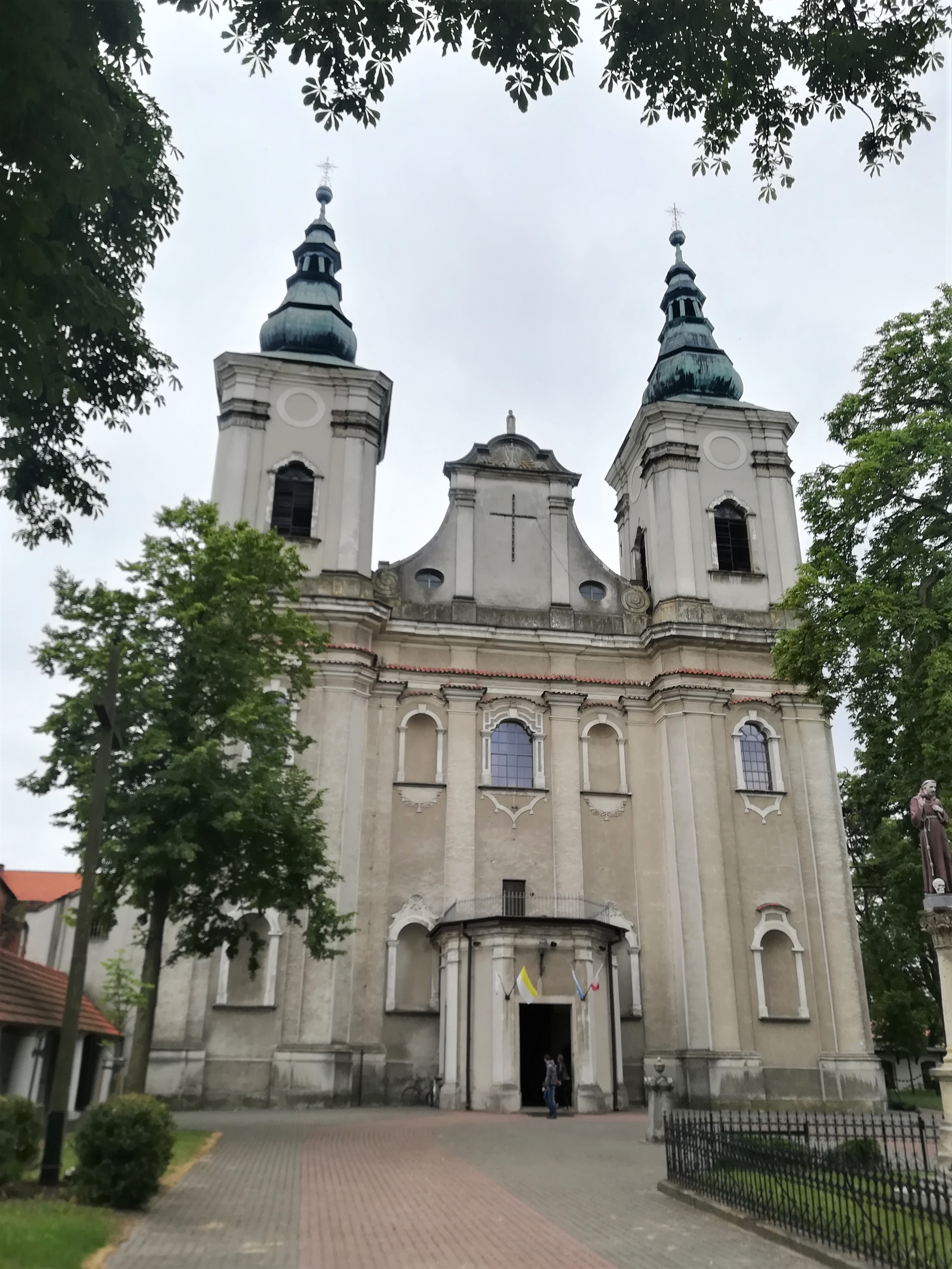
- Church of the Transfiguration of the Christ

- Location within Poland
- Coordinates: 51°18′21″N 20°6′46″E
- Country: Poland
- Voivodeship: Łódź
- County: Opoczno
- Gmina: Paradyż

Population
  - Total: 530

Paradyż ([paˈradɨʂ]) is a village in Opoczno County, Łódź Voivodeship, in central Poland. It is the seat of the gmina (administrative district) called Gmina Paradyż.

The history of Paradyż dates back to the second half of the 18th century and is closely tied with a Bernardine Monastery, which was founded at that time in the nearby village of Wielka Wola. Soon afterwards, a new village named Paradyż was founded near the monastery. Its name comes from a Latin language word paradisus, which means paradise. In 1789, local nobleman Jan Saryusz Skorkowski, who owned Wielka Wola and Paradyż, and whose grandfather Kazimierz Skorkowski had invited the monks here, made plans to attract Catholic settlers to the village and to raise it to the status of a town. The plan failed, and Paradyż still remains a village, which until the January Uprising was closely tied with the monastery.
