= Nowa Góra, Łódź Voivodeship =

Nowa Góra
- Village
- Location within Poland
- Coordinates: 51°13′35″N 20°10′34″E
- Country: Poland
- Voivodeship: Łódź
- County: Opoczno
- Gmina: Żarnów

Nowa Góra [ˈnɔva ˈɡura] is a village in the administrative district of Gmina Żarnów, within Opoczno County, Łódź Voivodeship, in central Poland.
