= Gmina Żarnów =

Gmina Żarnów Żarnów Commune
- Gmina
- Coat of arms
- Interactive map of Gmina Żarnów
- Coordinates (Żarnów): 51°14′50″N 20°10′14″E
- Country: Poland
- Voivodeship: Łódź
- County: Opoczno
- Seat: Żarnów

Area
  - Total: 140.7 km^{2} (54.3 sq mi)

Population (2006)
  - Total: 6,260
  - Density: 44.5/km^{2} (115/sq mi)

Gmina Żarnów is a rural gmina (administrative district) in Opoczno County, Łódź Voivodeship, in central Poland. Its seat is the village of Żarnów, which lies approximately 18 kilometres (11 mi) south-west of Opoczno and 77 km (48 mi) south-east of the regional capital Łódź.

The gmina covers an area of 140.7 square kilometres (54.3 sq mi), and as of 2006 its total population is 6,260.

== Villages ==
Gmina Żarnów contains the villages and settlements of Adamów, Afryka, Antoniów, Bronów, Budków, Chełsty, Dąbie, Dłużniewice, Grębenice, Jasion, Kamieniec, Klew, Klew-Kolonia, Ławki, Łysa Góra, Malenie, Malków, Marcinków, Miedzna Murowana, Młynek, Myślibórz, Nadole, Niemojowice, Niemojowice-Kolonia, Nowa Góra, Odrowąż, Paszkowice, Pilichowice, Poręba, Ruszenice, Ruszenice-Kolonia, Siedlów, Sielec, Skórkowice, Skumros, Soczówki, Straszowa Wola, Tomaszów, Topolice, Trojanowice, Widuch, Wierzchowisko, Żarnów and Zdyszewice.

== Neighbouring gminas ==
Gmina Żarnów is bordered by the gminas of Aleksandrów, Białaczów, Fałków, Końskie, Paradyż and Ruda Maleniecka.
