= Miedzna Murowana =

- Village
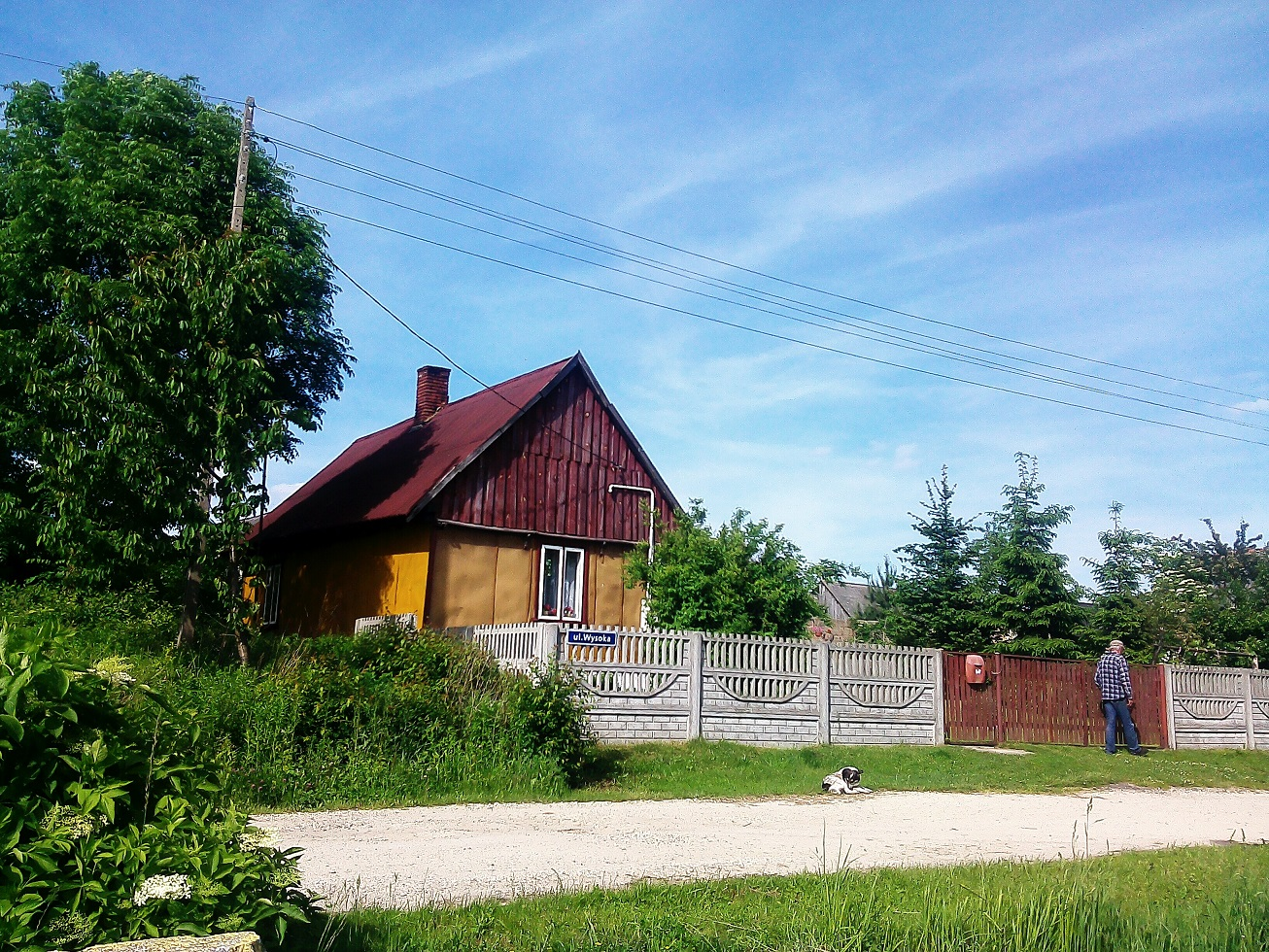

- Location within Poland
- Coordinates: 51°18′N 20°14′E
- Country: Poland
- Voivodeship: Łódź
- County: Opoczno
- Gmina: Żarnów
- Population: 557

Miedzna Murowana [ˈmjɛd͡zna murɔˈvana] is a village in the administrative district of Gmina Żarnów, within Opoczno County, Łódź Voivodeship, in central Poland.
