= Ponikła, Łódź Voivodeship =

Ponikła
- Village
- Location within Poland
- Coordinates: 51°33′5″N 20°18′49″E
- Country: Poland
- Voivodeship: Łódź
- County: Opoczno
- Gmina: Poświętne
- Population: 50

Ponikła [pɔˈnikwa] is a village in the administrative district of Gmina Poświętne, within Opoczno County, Łódź Voivodeship, in central Poland.
