= Bronów, Opoczno County =

Bronów
- Village
- Location within Poland
- Coordinates: 51°15′N 20°12′E
- Country: Poland
- Voivodeship: Łódź
- County: Opoczno
- Gmina: Żarnów

Bronów [ˈbrɔnuf] is a village in the administrative district of Gmina Żarnów, within Opoczno County, Łódź Voivodeship, in central Poland.
