= Żarnów =

- Town
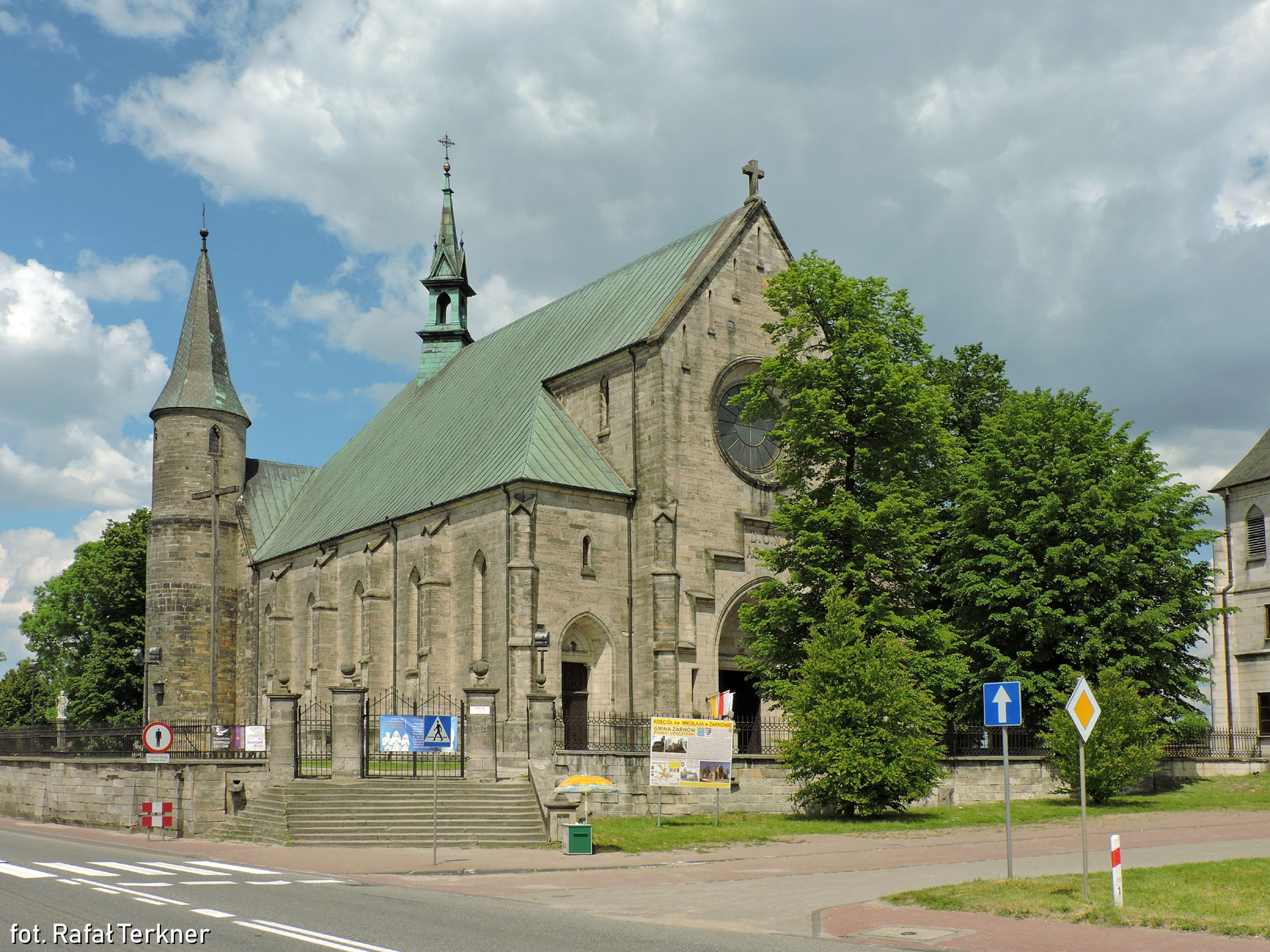
- Romanesque church of Saint Nicholas

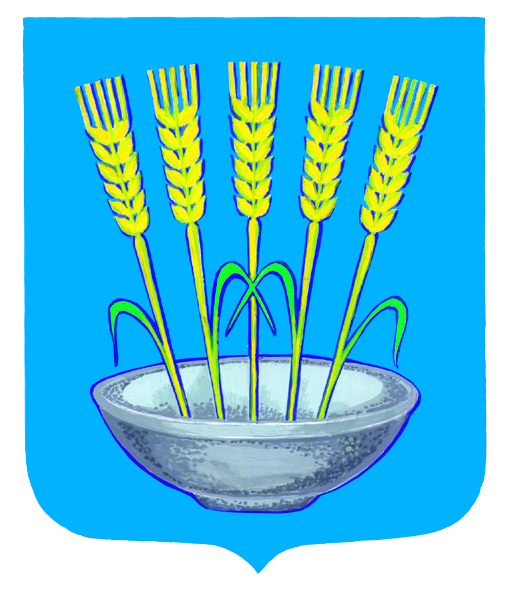
- Coat of arms

- Location within Poland
- Coordinates: 51°14′50″N 20°10′14″E
- Country: Poland
- Voivodeship: Łódź
- County: Opoczno
- Gmina: Żarnów

Population
  - Total: 870
- Time zone: UTC+1 (CET)
  - Summer (DST): UTC+2 (CEST)
- Vehicle registration: EOP
- Website: http://www.zarnow.prv.pl

Żarnów [ˈʐarnuf] is a town in Opoczno County, Łódź Voivodeship, in central Poland. It is the seat of the administrative district called Gmina Żarnów. It lies approximately 18 km (11 mi) south-west of Opoczno and 77 km (48 mi) south-east of the regional capital Łódź.

The town belongs to historic region of Lesser Poland. Its name most probably comes from the phrase miejsce żarne - burned-out area, and refers to burning of forests in ancient times, to make fields. Żarnów has a long history, in the early years of Polish state it was a major urban center of the country. The first written mention of the settlement dates from 1065.

== History ==
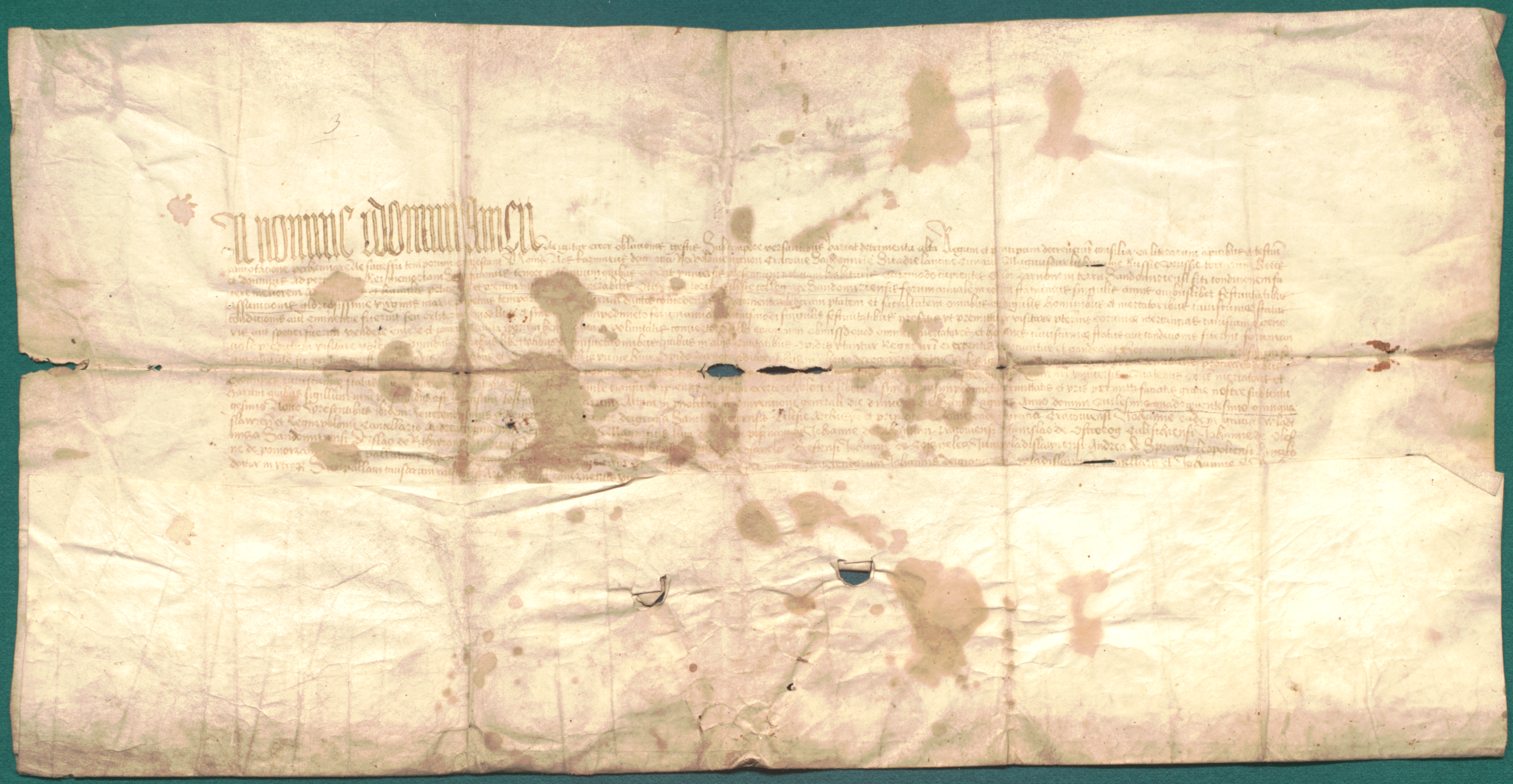
Act of establishment of annual fairs by King Casimir IV Jagiellon

Żarnów was founded before 1065, as the first written mention of the settlement comes from that year, and it had already existed. It was home to one of the oldest Polish castellanies, with a church founded in 1111 by prince Bolesław III Wrymouth as a votum for his victories in a war with Pomeranian tribes. In 1136, a papal bull of Innocent II mentioned Sarnov as one of major grods of central Poland, together with other administrative centers of the area - Skrzynno and Małogoszcz (the three towns made the so-called Pilica castellanies). In 1191 Żarnów's parish church (most likely founded by Prince Casimir II the Just) was mentioned among seven major churches of the Sandomierz collegiate church. In the 12th century Żarnów was an important urban center of northern Lesser Poland, with its own gord and church. In 1415 Żarnów received a town charter, and despite losing its importance to the nearby town of Opoczno, the title of Castellan of Żarnów remained in use until the Partitions of Poland. It was the site of a major battle during the Swedish invasion of Poland in 1655.

In 1795 Żarnów was annexed by the Austrian Empire in the Third Partition of Poland. Following the Polish victory in the Austro-Polish War of 1809, it was regained by Poles and included within the short-lived Duchy of Warsaw. In 1815, it became part of Russian-controlled Congress Poland. Like many other towns of northern Lesser Poland, Żarnów lost its town privileges in 1876. The Russians reduced it to the status of a village for residents’ participation in the January Uprising.

Following the joint German-Soviet invasion of Poland, which started World War II in September 1939, it was occupied by Germany until 1945.

== Points of interest ==
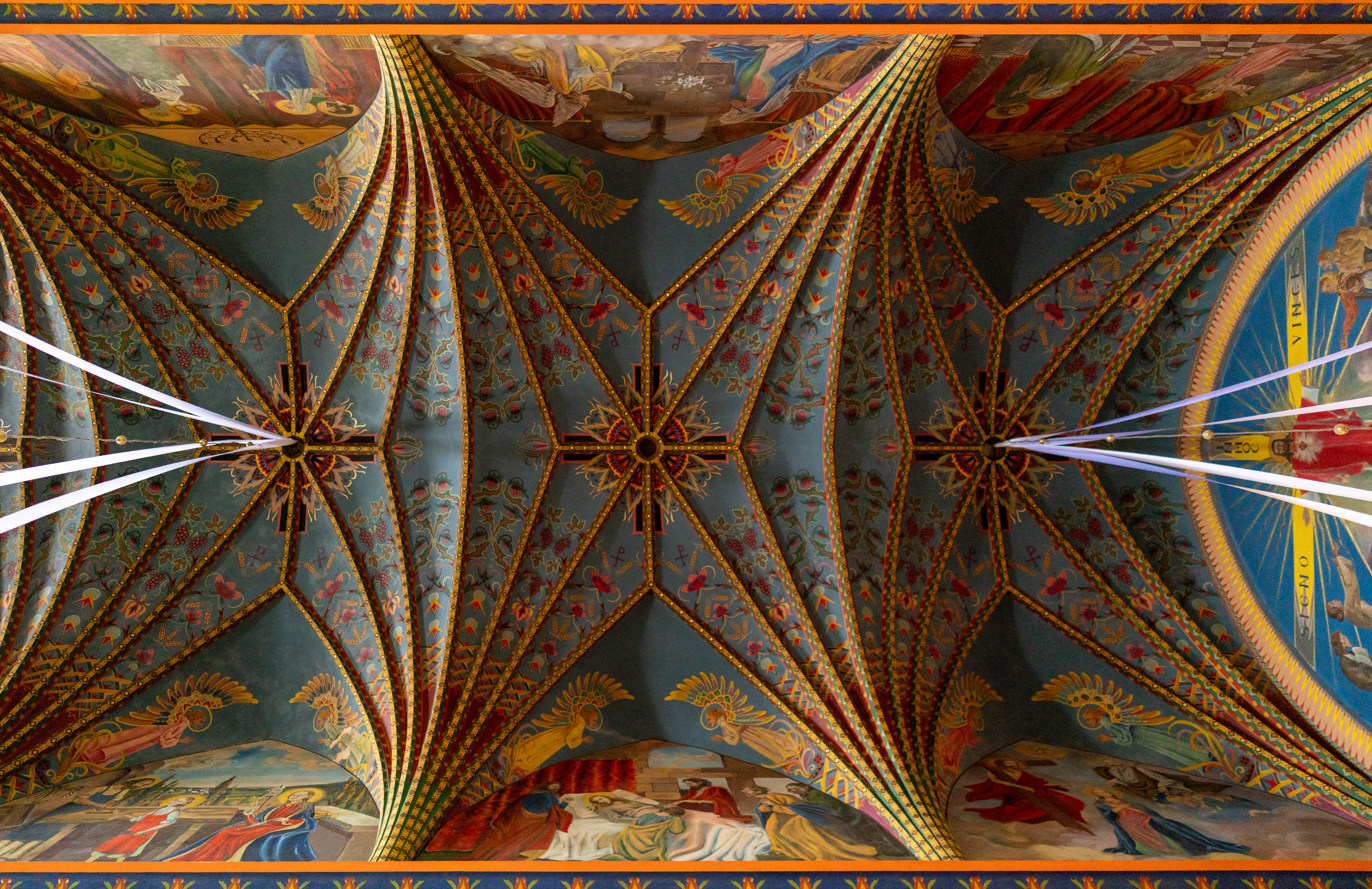
Saint Nicholas church interior

- St. Nicholas parish church (12th century). Its western wall, with a Romanesque structure, has preserved the original shape. Also, Romanesque are the church round tower and the matroneum. In the Middle Ages, Żarnów's church was located by a busy merchant road from Sandomierz to Greater Poland. The town itself was at that time located to the south and west of the church. In 1510, a Gothic presbytery was added,
- remains of the 11th century Slavic gord, located in central part of the village. Żarnów at that time was a fortified settlement, with the castle of the castellan, and a moat surrounding the gord. Currently, the locals call the gord the Swedish Mountain, as here King John II Casimir observed the September 16, 1655 battle between the Poles and the Swedes. On the top of the Swedish Mountain there is a monument with a Polish eagle, erected on May 3, 1923.
- central part of the ancient town of Żarnów. The village originally was a defensive gord, located on a hill, with round shape and a diameter of some 50 meters. Most probably, it was the capital of early Western Slavic princes, out of whom the noble family of Odrowąż (see Odrowąż coat of arms) emerged.
- wooden bell-tower (early 19th century). Its bells were famous for the sound. The oldest bell was made in 1533, and together with other bells, was stolen by the German occupiers during World War II.

== Transport ==
Żarnów lies on national road 74. Voivodeship roads 746 and 726 also meet in the town.

The nearest railway station is in Opoczno.
