= Topolice, Łódź Voivodeship =

Topolice
- Village
- Location within Poland
- Coordinates: 51°17′N 20°11′E
- Country: Poland
- Voivodeship: Łódź
- County: Opoczno
- Gmina: Żarnów
- Population: 310

Topolice [tɔpɔˈlit͡sɛ] is a village in the administrative district of Gmina Żarnów, within Opoczno County, Łódź Voivodeship, in central Poland.
