= Poświętne, Opoczno County =

Poświętne
- Village
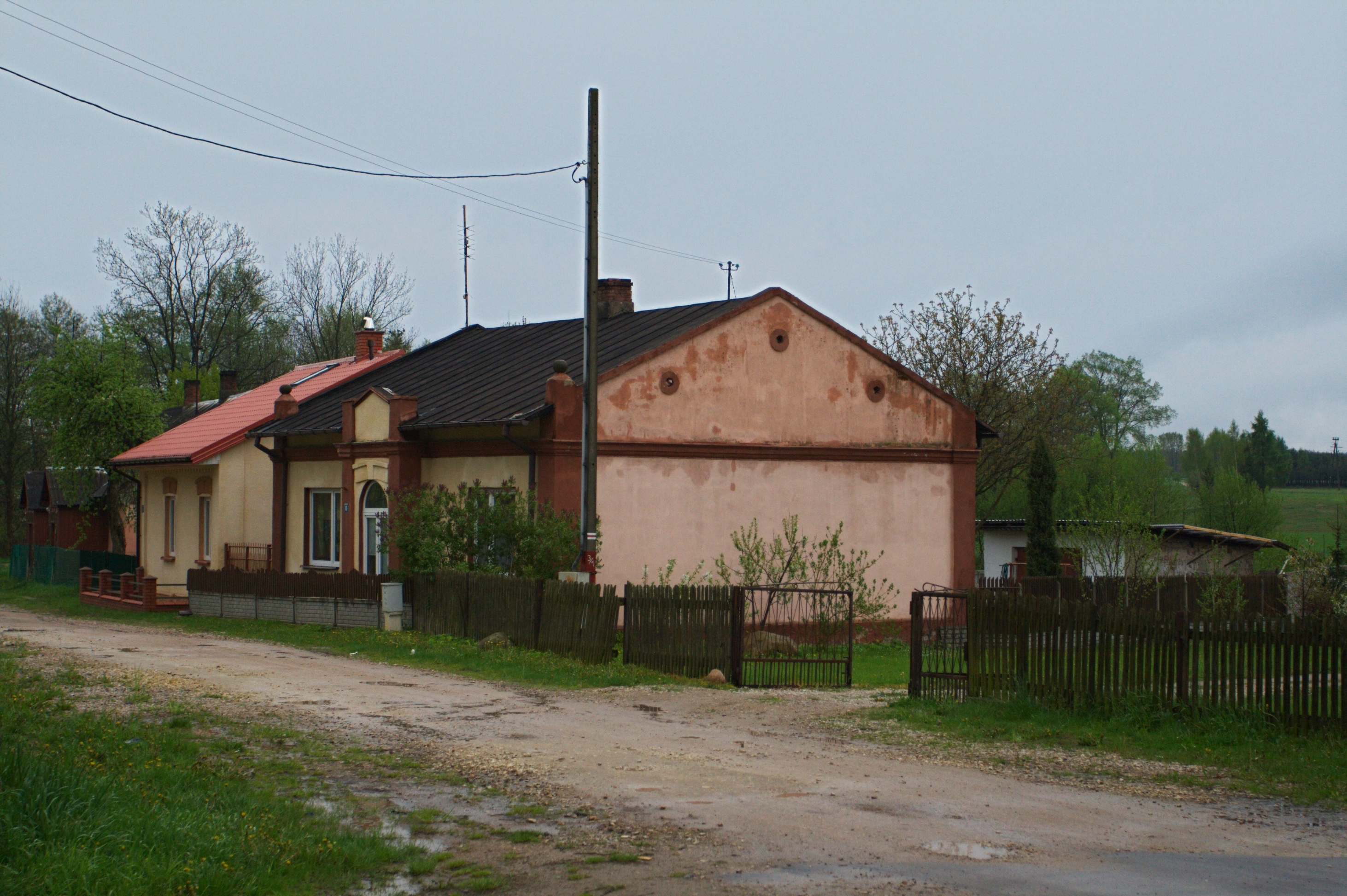

- Location within Poland
- Coordinates: 51°31′52″N 20°22′1″E
- Country: Poland
- Voivodeship: Łódź
- County: Opoczno
- Gmina: Poświętne
- Population: 412

Poświętne [pɔɕˈfjɛntnɛ] is a village in Opoczno County, Łódź Voivodeship, in central Poland. It is the seat of the gmina (administrative district) called Gmina Poświętne.
