= Nadole, Łódź Voivodeship =

Nadole
- Village
- Location within Poland
- Coordinates: 51°16′N 20°13′E
- Country: Poland
- Voivodeship: Łódź
- County: Opoczno
- Gmina: Żarnów

Nadole [naˈdɔlɛ] is a village in the administrative district of Gmina Żarnów, within Opoczno County, Łódź Voivodeship, in central Poland.
