= Marcinków, Łódź Voivodeship =

Marcinków
- Village
- Location within Poland
- Coordinates: 51°13′N 20°8′E
- Country: Poland
- Voivodeship: Łódź
- County: Opoczno
- Gmina: Żarnów

Marcinków [marˈt͡ɕiŋkuf] is a village in the administrative district of Gmina Żarnów, within Opoczno County, Łódź Voivodeship, in central Poland.
