= Bronów =

Bronów may refer to:

- Bronów, Góra County in Lower Silesian Voivodeship (south-west Poland)
- Bronów, Silesian Voivodeship (south Poland)
- Bronów, Świdnica County in Lower Silesian Voivodeship (south-west Poland)
- Bronów, Opoczno County in Łódź Voivodeship (central Poland)
- Bronów, Poddębice County in Łódź Voivodeship (central Poland)
- Bronów, Świętokrzyskie Voivodeship (south-central Poland)
- Bronów, Greater Poland Voivodeship (west-central Poland)
