= Gmina Paradyż =

Gmina in central Poland

Gmina Paradyż Paradyż Commune
- Gmina
- Interactive map of Gmina Paradyż
- Coordinates (Paradyż): 51°18′21″N 20°6′46″E
- Country: Poland
- Voivodeship: Łódź
- County: Opoczno
- Seat: Paradyż

Area
  - Total: 81.56 km^{2} (31.49 sq mi)

Population (2006)
  - Total: 4,421
  - Density: 54.21/km^{2} (140.4/sq mi)

Gmina Paradyż is a rural gmina (administrative district) in Opoczno County, Łódź Voivodeship, in central Poland. Its seat is the village of Paradyż, which lies approximately 15 kilometres (9 mi) south-west of Opoczno and 70 km (43 mi) south-east of the regional capital Łódź.

The gmina covers an area of 81.56 square kilometres (31.5 sq mi), and as of 2006 its total population is 4,421.

== Villages ==
Gmina Paradyż contains the villages and settlements of Adamów, Alfonsów, Bogusławy, Daleszewice, Dorobna Wola, Feliksów, Grzymałów, Honoratów, Irenów, Joaniów, Kazimierzów, Krasik, Mariampol, Paradyż, Podgaj, Popławy-Kolonia, Przyłęk, Solec, Stanisławów, Stawowice, Stawowice-Kolonia, Stawowiczki, Sylwerynów, Wielka Wola, Wójcin, Wójcin A and Wójcin B.

== Neighbouring gminas ==
Gmina Paradyż is bordered by the gminas of Aleksandrów, Białaczów, Mniszków, Sławno and Żarnów.
