= Mysiakowiec =

- Village
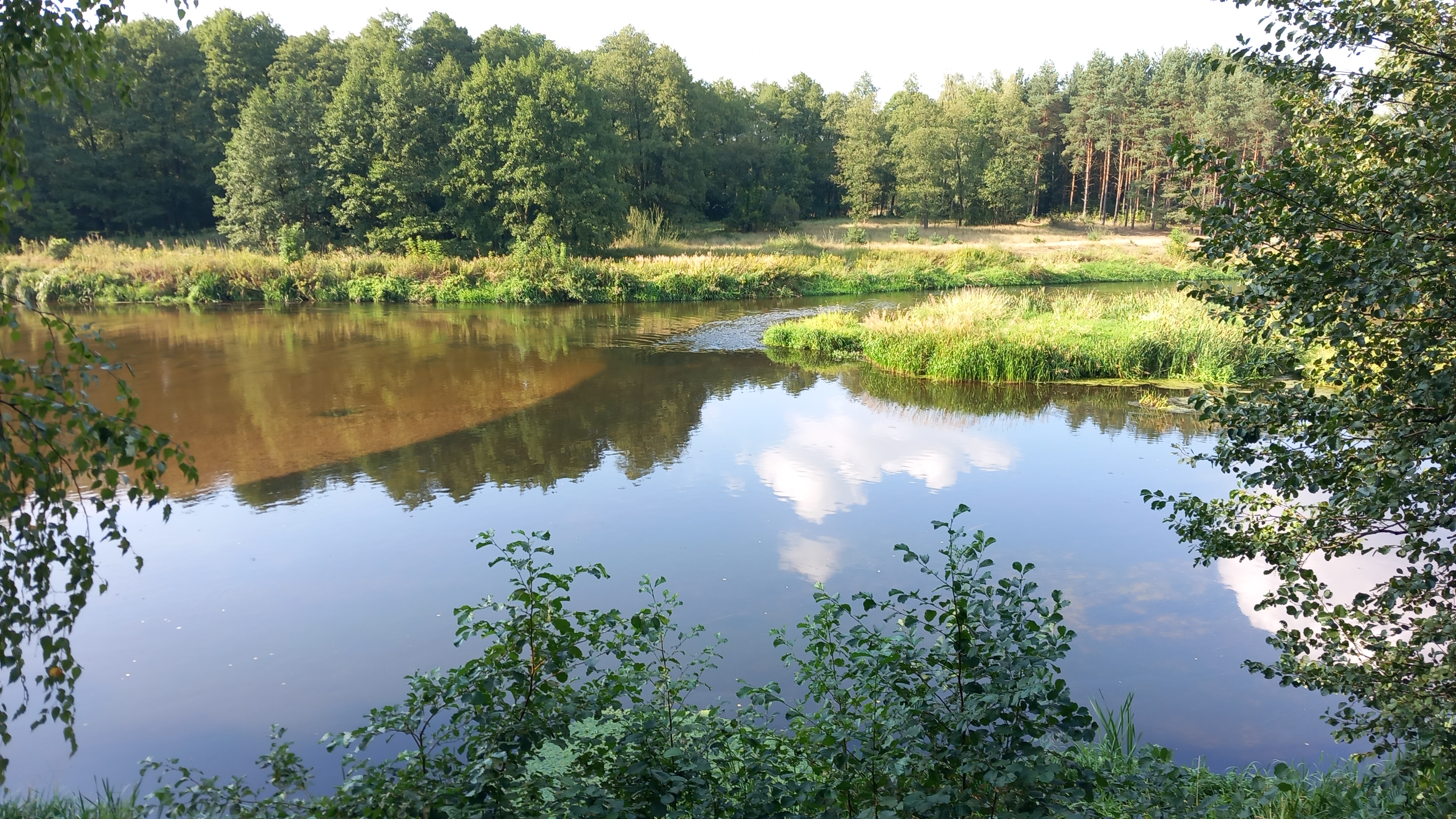

- Location within Poland
- Coordinates: 51°35′N 20°21′E
- Country: Poland
- Voivodeship: Łódź
- County: Opoczno
- Gmina: Poświętne
- Population: 110

Mysiakowiec [mɨɕaˈkɔvjɛt͡s] is a village in the administrative district of Gmina Poświętne, within Opoczno County, Łódź Voivodeship, in central Poland.
