= Bronowice =

Bronowice may refer to:

- Bronowice, Kraków, a district of Kraków, Poland (including former villages of Bronowice and Bronowice Małe)
- Bronowice Małe, part of Bronowice district of Krakow
- Bronowice Wielkie, part of the Prądnik Biały district of Kraków
- Bronowice, Łódź Voivodeship (central Poland)
- Bronowice, Lublin Voivodeship (east Poland)
- Bronowice, Strzelce-Drezdenko County in Lubusz Voivodeship (west Poland)
- Bronowice, Żary County in Lubusz Voivodeship (west Poland)
