= Gmina Poświętne, Łódź Voivodeship =

Gmina Poświętne Poświętne Commune
- Gmina
- Interactive map of Gmina Poświętne
- Coordinates (Poświętne): 51°31′52″N 20°22′1″E
- Country: Poland
- Voivodeship: Łódź
- County: Opoczno
- Seat: Poświętne

Area
  - Total: 140.87 km^{2} (54.39 sq mi)

Population (2006)
  - Total: 3,318
  - Density: 23.55/km^{2} (61.00/sq mi)
- Website: www.poswietne.pl

Gmina Poświętne is a rural gmina (administrative district) in Opoczno County, Łódź Voivodeship, in central Poland. Its seat is the village of Poświętne, approximately 18 kilometres (11 mi) north of Opoczno and 69 km (43 mi) southeast of the regional capital Łódź.

The gmina covers 140.87 square kilometres (54.4 sq mi)s. As of 2006 its total population is 3,318.

The gmina contains part of the protected area called Spała Landscape Park.

== Villages ==
Gmina Poświętne contains the villages and settlements of Anielin, Brudzewice, Brudzewice-Kolonia, Buczek, Dęba, Dęborzeczka, Fryszerka, Gapinin, Gapinin-Kolonia, Kozłowiec, Małoszyce, Mysiakowiec, Ponikła, Poręby, Poświętne, Stefanów, Studzianna and Wólka Kuligowska.

== Neighbouring gminas ==
Gmina Poświętne is bordered by the gminas of Drzewica, Inowłódz, Odrzywół, Opoczno and Rzeczyca.
