= Bronowo =

Bronowo may refer to:

- Bronowo, Podlaskie Voivodeship (north-east Poland)
- Bronowo, Gmina Stegna, Nowy Dwór County in Pomeranian Voivodeship (north Poland)
- Bronowo, Słupsk County in Pomeranian Voivodeship (north Poland)
- Bronowo, Warmian-Masurian Voivodeship (north Poland)
- Bronowo, West Pomeranian Voivodeship (north-west Poland)
