= Drzewica =

Town in Łódź Voivodeship, Poland

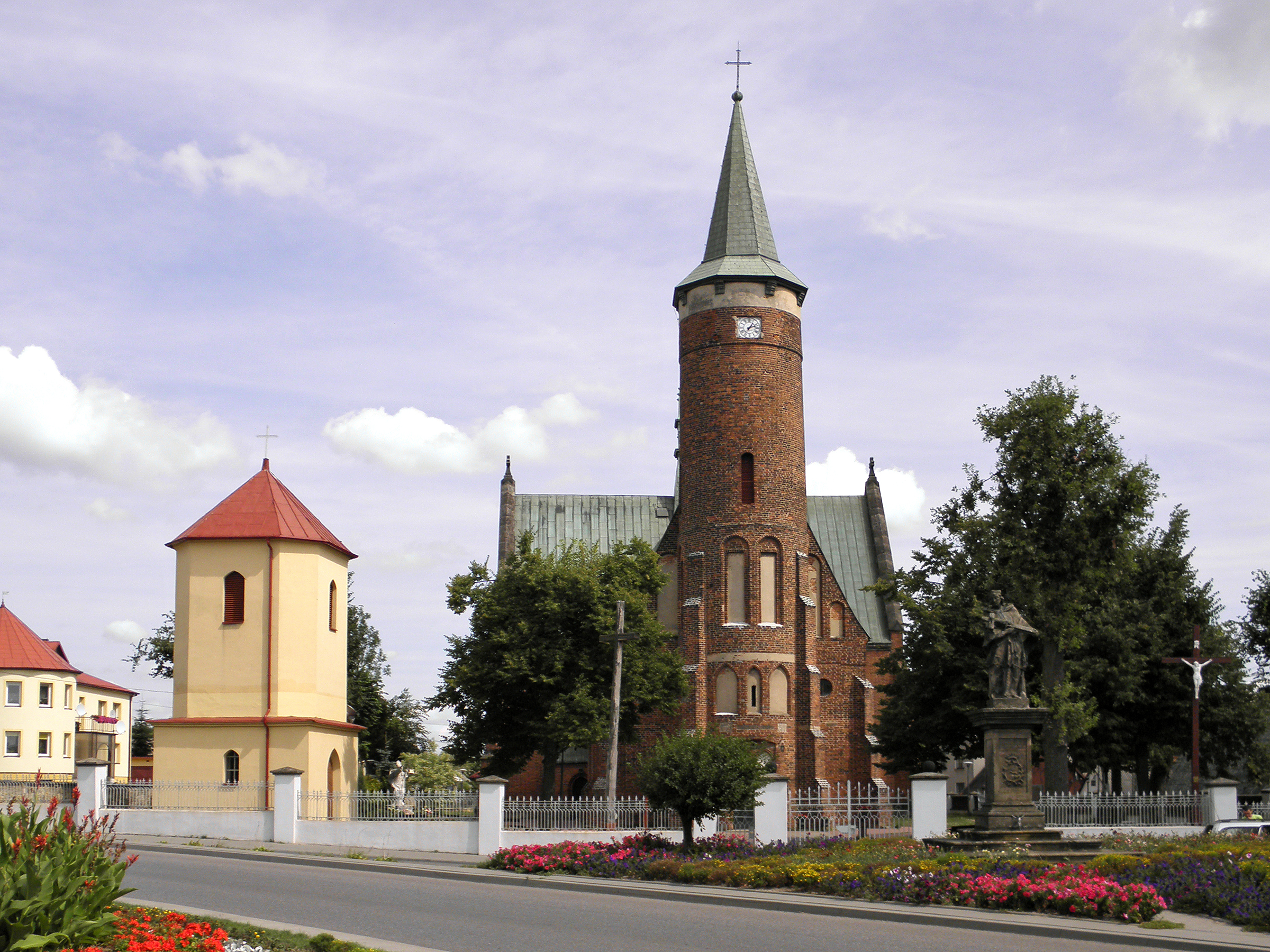
- Saint Lucas Church

- Coat of arms

- Location within Poland
- Coordinates: 51°26′49″N 20°28′19″E
- Country: Poland
- Voivodeship: Łódź
- County: Opoczno
- Gmina: Drzewica
- Town rights: 1429-1869, 1987

Government
  - Mayor: Janusz Bernard Reszelewski

Area
  - Total: 4.9 km^{2} (1.9 sq mi)

Population (31 December 2021)
  - Total: 3,778
  - Density: 770/km^{2} (2,000/sq mi)
- Time zone: UTC+1 (CET)
  - Summer (DST): UTC+2 (CEST)
- Postal code: 26-340
- Area code: +48 48
- Car plates: EOP
- Website: http://www.drzewica.pl

Drzewica [dʐɛˈvʲit͡sa] is a town in Opoczno County, Łódź Voivodeship, Poland, with 3,778 inhabitants as of December 2021. Located on the Drzewiczka river (a tributary to the Pilica), in the northwestern corner of the historic province of Lesser Poland, Drzewica is home to Gerlach, a renowned cutlery manufacturer, founded in 1760 in Warsaw (since 1886 in Drzewica). In the first half of the 16th century, the Archbishop of Gniezno and Primate of Poland Maciej Drzewicki built here a rectangular-shaped castle, surrounded by a moat. The castle burned in 1814 and now is a well-preserved ruin.

== History ==
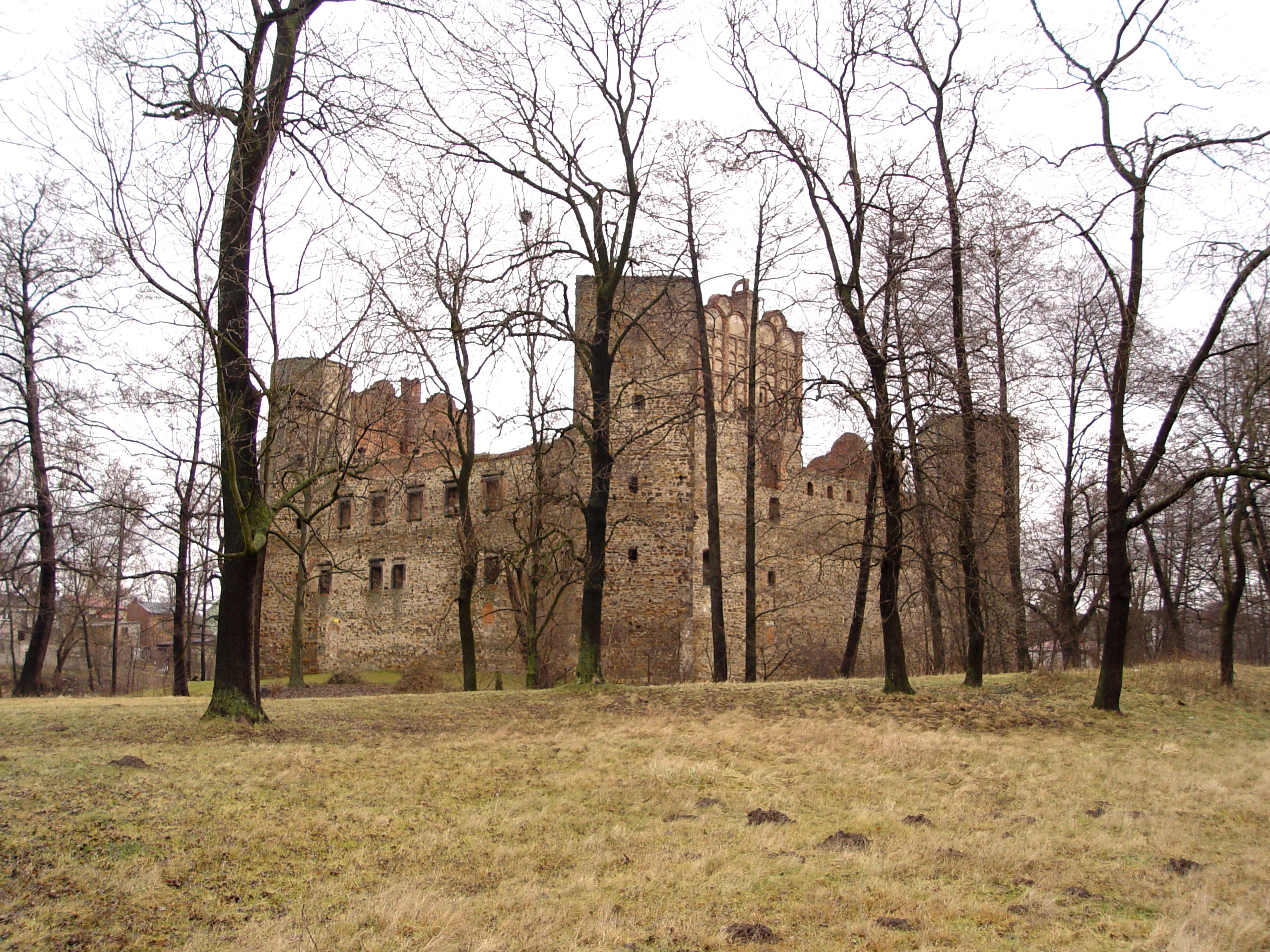
Castle

The town of Drzewica dates back to the 13th century, when prince Konrad I of Masovia granted the area to the Drzewicki (Ciołek coat of arms) family. The family owned Drzewica for 500 years, and its properties stretched from the Pilica to the Holy Cross Mountains. In 1429 in Nieszawa, Drzewica was granted town rights by King Władysław II Jagiełło. Three annual fairs were established. It was administratively located in the Opoczno County, Sandomierz Voivodeship, Lesser Poland Province. The town prospered in the early 16th century, when its owner Maciej Drzewicki (1467–1535) was a personal secretary of King John I Albert. Drzewicki renovated the ancient castle, turning it from a Gothic stronghold into a Renaissance residence. During the Deluge, Drzewica was destroyed by the Swedish army.

In the early 18th century Drzewica was purchased by Fabian Szaniawski. Drzewica became one of early centers of Polish industry, after one of the first Polish blast furnaces was built here by Filip Szaniawski in 1760. Soon afterwards, northern Lesser Poland became industrialized (see Old-Polish Industrial Region). In 1806, the estate passed to the Rejski family.

After the Partitions of Poland, Drzewica was annexed by the Russian Empire (1815), together with Congress Poland. The town was an important center of the January Uprising. In 1869, Tsarist authorities reduced it to the status of a village. Following World War I, Poland regained independence and control of the settlement.

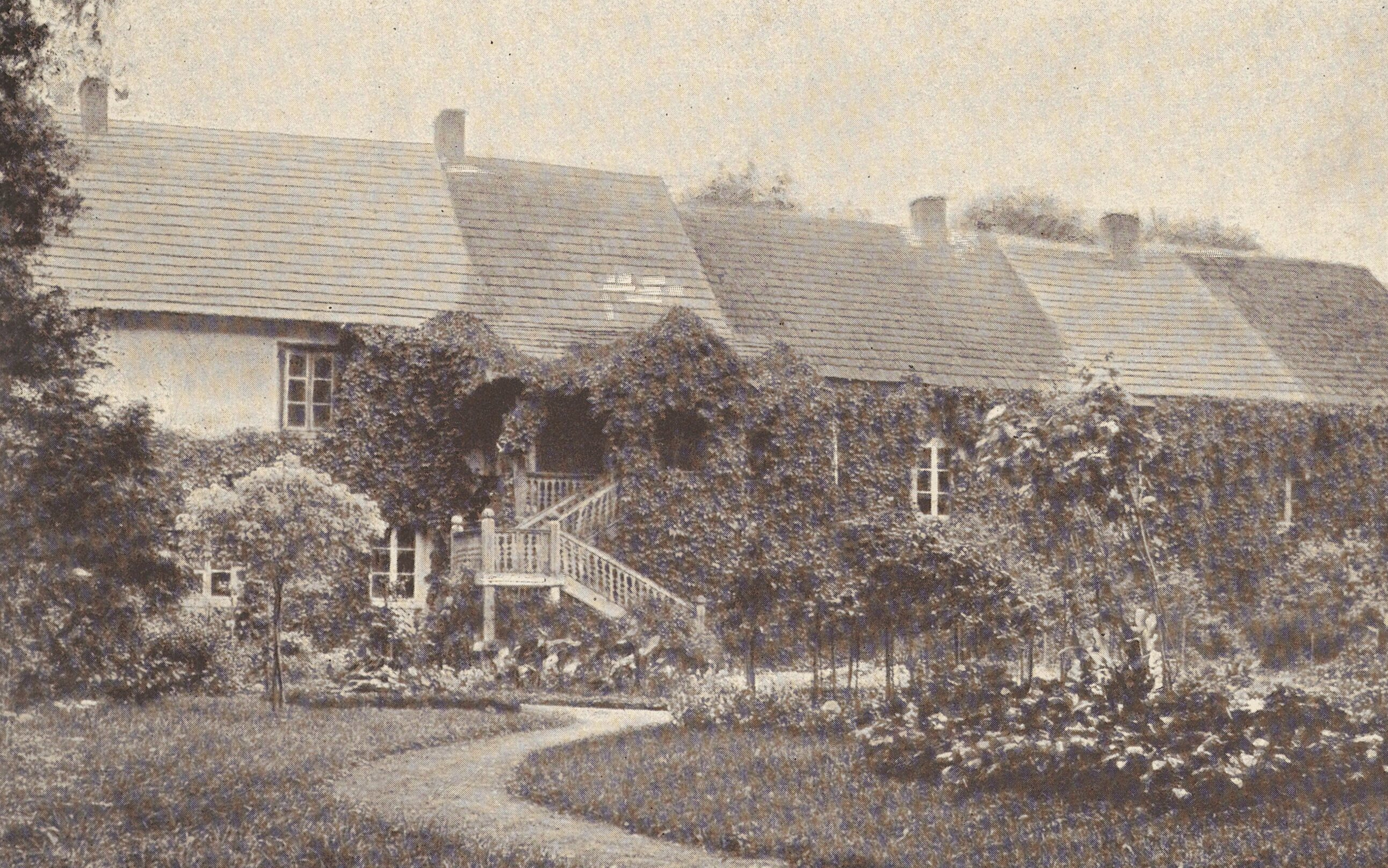
Manor house before 1911

On September 8, 1939, a nearby forest was the place of a bloody skirmish between Polish Army and the Wehrmacht. The German occupation began that month. The Jewish population of Drzewica was about 750 at the time. The occupying authorities brought Jews from nearby villages into the town, increasing the population to over 2,000. Deprived of livelihoods and forbidden to bring personal belongings, the newly arrived residents were forced to live in severe poverty.

Several Poles, who were either born or lived and worked in Drzewica, including the owner of the local estate and the local police chief, were murdered by the Russians in the Katyn massacre in 1940.

Memorial to Polish partisans of World War II

In the autumn of 1941, Jews were forced to live in a ghetto and the severe overcrowding (eight to ten people on average shared each room) there led to epidemics of both typhus and typhoid. Police would enter the ghetto periodically to randomly murder people. In July 1942, some Jews were taken to a forced labour camp while the others remained in the ghetto. In October, the Germans surrounded the ghetto and lit fires around to prevent escape. The Jews were rounded up and marched to Opoczno where, a few days later, they were sent to the Treblinka extermination camp where they were immediately murdered by gassing. The few Jews who were left behind to sort Jewish possessions were themselves rounded up a few months later and sent to the Ujazd ghetto and from there to Treblinka. Only about five to seven Drzewica Jews are known to have survived the Holocaust.

From 1975 to 1998 the town was a part of Radom Voivodeship. In 1987 Drzewica regained its town status.

== Transport ==
Drzewica lies on voivodeship road 728.

It has a station on the Łódź-Radom railway line.
