= Mysliboř =

- Municipality
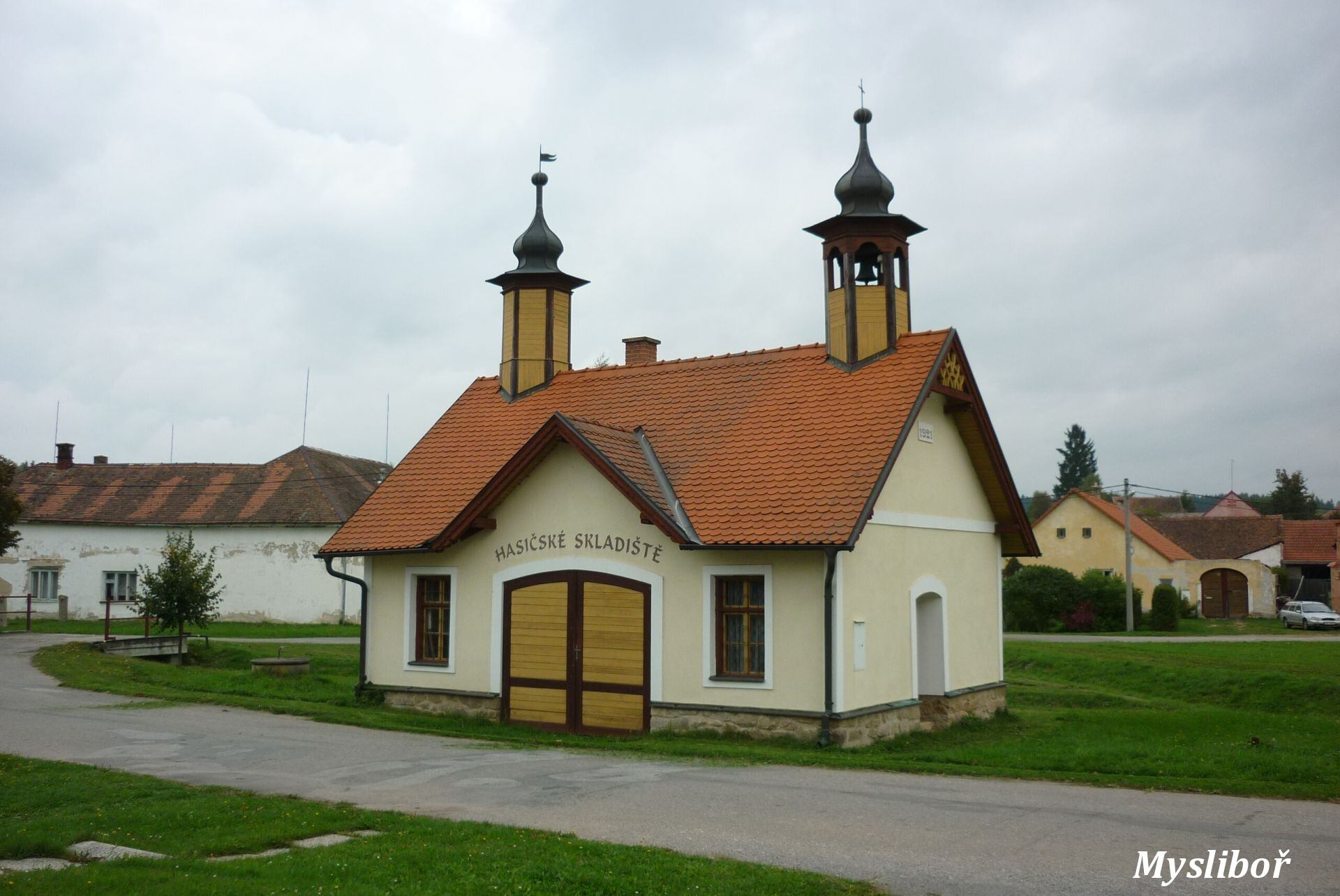
- Firehouse

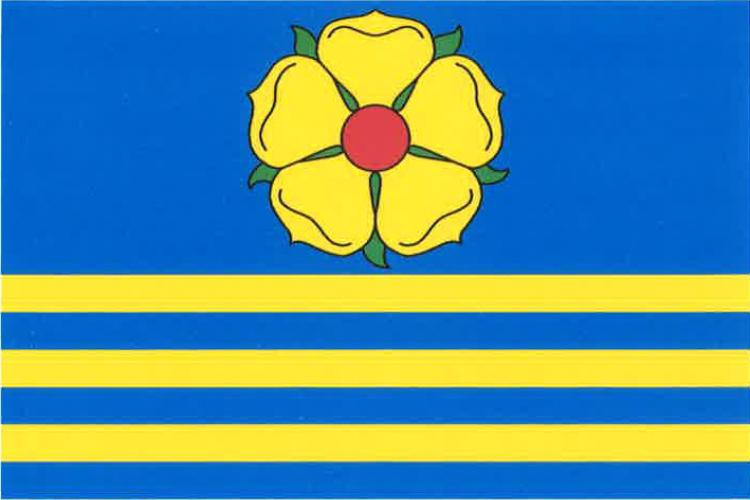
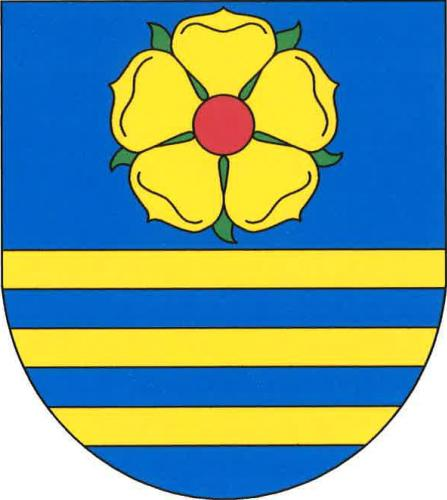
- Flag Coat of arms

- Location in the Czech Republic
- Coordinates: 49°12′39″N 15°28′50″E
- Country: Czech Republic
- Region: Vysočina
- District: Jihlava
- First mentioned: 1366

Area
  - Total: 7.39 km^{2} (2.85 sq mi)
- Elevation: 536 m (1,759 ft)

Population (2026-01-01)
  - Total: 198
  - Density: 26.8/km^{2} (69.4/sq mi)
- Time zone: UTC+1 (CET)
  - Summer (DST): UTC+2 (CEST)
- Postal code: 588 62
- Website: myslibor.imunis.cz

Mysliboř (Czech pronunciation: [ˈmɪslɪbor̝̊]) is a municipality and village in Jihlava District in the Vysočina Region of the Czech Republic. It has about 200 inhabitants.

== Geography ==
Mysliboř is located about 22 kilometres (14 mi) south of Jihlava. It lies in the Křižanov Highlands. The highest point is at 630 m (2,067 ft) above sea level. The Votavice Stream flows through the municipality. There are several small fishponds in the municipal territory.

== History ==
The first written mention of Mysliboř is from 1366. For its entire feudal history, it belonged to the Telč estate.

== Demographics ==
Historical population

Year	Pop.	±%
1869	317	—
1880	333	+5.0%
1890	343	+3.0%
1900	335	−2.3%
1910	304	−9.3%

Year	Pop.	±%
1921	303	−0.3%
1930	310	+2.3%
1950	256	−17.4%
1961	250	−2.3%
1970	232	−7.2%

Year	Pop.	±%
1980	235	+1.3%
1991	229	−2.6%
2001	223	−2.6%
2011	194	−13.0%
2021	204	+5.2%

Source: Censuses

== Transport ==
Mysliboř is located on the railway line Havlíčkův Brod–Slavonice.

== Sights ==
Among the protected cultural monuments is a conciliation cross (stone) from the 15th or 16th century, a memorial stone from 1890, and a rural Neoclassical house from the 18th century with modifications from the 19th century, which is a valuable example of well-preserved regional folk architecture.
