= Opoczno County =

Opoczno County Powiat opoczyński
- County
- Flag Coat of arms

- Location within the voivodeship
- Coordinates (Opoczno): 51°23′N 20°17′E
- Country: Poland
- Voivodeship: Łódź
- Seat: Opoczno
- Gminas: Total 8: Gmina Białaczów; Gmina Drzewica; Gmina Mniszków; Gmina Opoczno; Gmina Paradyż; Gmina Poświętne; Gmina Sławno; Gmina Żarnów

Area
  - Total: 1,038.77 km^{2} (401.07 sq mi)

Population (2009)
  - Total: 78,467
  - Density: 75.538/km^{2} (195.64/sq mi)
  - Urban: 26,653
  - Rural: 52,006
- Car plates: EOP
- Website: www.opocznopowiat.pl

Opoczno County (Polish: powiat opoczyński) is a unit of territorial administration and local government (powiat) in Łódź Voivodeship, south-east Poland. It came into being on January 1, 1999, as a result of the Polish local government reforms passed in 1998. Its administrative seat and largest town is Opoczno, which lies 72 kilometres (45 mi) south-east of the regional capital Łódź. The only other town in the county is Drzewica, lying 15 km (9 mi) north-east of Opoczno.

The county covers an area of 1,038.77 square kilometres (401.1 sq mi). As of 2009 its total population is 78,467, out of which the population of Opoczno is 21,635 (2016), that of Drzewica is 3,913 (2016), and the rural population is 52,006.

== Neighbouring counties ==
Opoczno County is bordered by Przysucha County to the east, Końskie County to the south, Piotrków County to the west and Tomaszów County to the north-west.

== Administrative divisions ==
The county is subdivided into eight gminas (two urban-rural and six rural). These are listed in the following table, in descending order of population.

Gmina	Type	Area (km^{2})	Population (2006)	Seat
Gmina Opoczno	urban-rural	190.5	35,418	Opoczno
Gmina Drzewica	urban-rural	118.4	11,053	Drzewica
Gmina Sławno	rural	128.5	7,421	Sławno
Gmina Żarnów	rural	140.7	6,260	Żarnów
Gmina Białaczów	rural	114.5	5,980	Białaczów
Gmina Mniszków	rural	123.8	4,788	Mniszków
Gmina Paradyż	rural	81.6	4,421	Paradyż
Gmina Poświętne	rural	140.9	3,318	Poświętne

== History ==
The history of Opoczno County dates back to the Middle Ages, when its present territory was divided between the castellanies of Skrzynno and Zarnow. By early 14th century, Opoczno emerged as the most important urban center of the region, and when castellanies were replaced by counties, the Opoczno County ruled by a starosta was created some time between 1346 – 1368.

Until the Partitions of Poland, Opoczno County belonged to Lesser Polands’ Sandomierz Voivodeship. In the 16th century, the county had the area of 2454 sq. kilometers, with such towns, as Opoczno, Gowarczow, Bialaczow, Odrzywol, Drzewica and Gielniow.

In 1795 Opoczno County was annexed by the Habsburg Empire, and in 1807, it was part of Radom Department of the Duchy of Warsaw. In 1837, the county became part of Radom Governorate of Russian-controlled Congress Poland, and in 1867, Konskie County was carved out of southeastern part of Opoczno County.

In the Second Polish Republic, Opoczno County was part of Kielce Voivodeship (1919–39). On April 1, 1939, the county was moved to Lodz Voivodeship. During World War II, Opoczno County was disbanded and merged into District (Kreis) of Tomaszow Mazowiecki. After the war, in 1944 – 1950, Opoczno County belonged to Lodz Voivodeship. On July 1, 1950, it was moved to Kielce Voivodeship.
