= Świerznica (river) =

Location
- Country: Poland

Physical characteristics
- Mouth
  - location: Mogilica
  - coordinates: 53.8687°N 15.9574°E

Basin features
- Progression: Mogilica→ Parsęta→ Baltic Sea

Świerznica is a river of Poland, a tributary of the Mogilica near Rąbino. A wooded area of the Świerznica valley close to the village Świerznica is part of the Parsęta Basin habitat protection area.
