= Budzistowo =

- Village
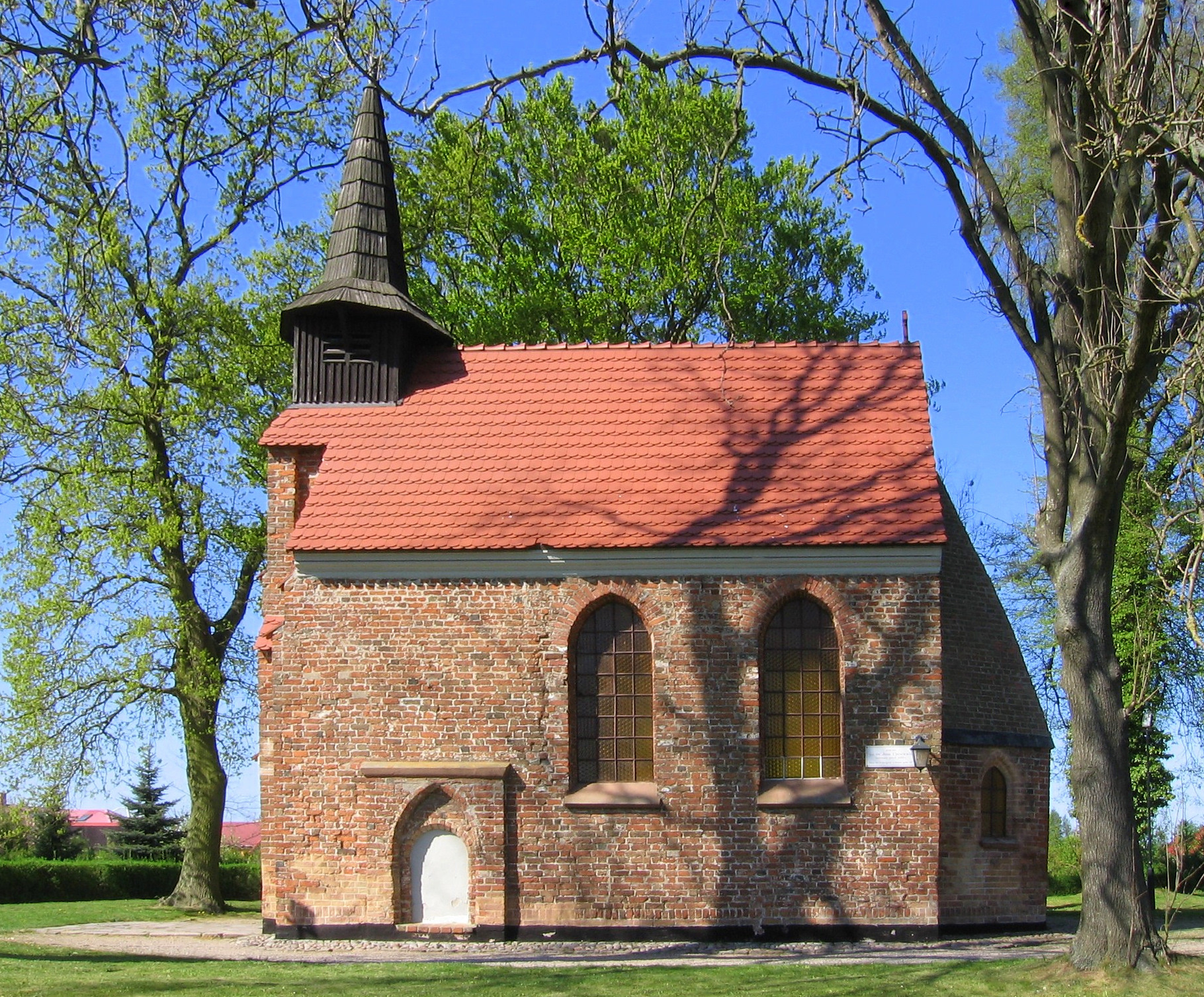
- Saint John the Baptist church, built before 1222

- Location within Poland
- Coordinates: 54°9′39″N 15°34′55″E
- Country: Poland
- Voivodeship: West Pomeranian
- County: Kołobrzeg
- Gmina: Kołobrzeg
- Population: 779
- Time zone: UTC+1 (CET)
  - Summer (DST): UTC+2 (CEST)

Budzistowo [bud͡ʑisˈtɔvɔ] (German: Altstadt) is a village in the administrative district of Gmina Kołobrzeg, within Kołobrzeg County, West Pomeranian Voivodeship, in north-western Poland. It lies approximately 2 km (1 mi) south-east of Kołobrzeg and 106 km (66 mi) north-east of the regional capital Szczecin.

From the 9th century to 1255, modern Budzistowo was the site of Salsa Cholbergensis, a Slavic Pomeranian burgh with a suburbium, located within medieval Poland. This settlement was built as the new center of the local subtribe after the southward emporium at Bardy-Świelubie was abandoned. St. John's church dates from this era, founded in the course of the conversion of Pomerania. The settlement was turned into a village when Kolberg (Kołobrzeg) was founded upstream the Parsęta river and now in turn served as the center of the area. Henceforth, the former Salsa Cholbergensis was known as Altstadt or Alt-Kolberg, meaning "Old Town" or "Old Kolberg". In 1945, it was officially renamed Budzistowo. It became part of Prussia in the 18th century, and from 1871 to 1945 was part of Germany.

For the history of the region, see History of Pomerania.

The village has a population of 779 (as of 2009).
