= Grudzianka (river) =

Location
- Country: Poland
- Voivodeship: West Pomeranian
- County (Powiat): Świdwin
- Gmina: Połczyn-Zdrój

Physical characteristics
- Source
  - location: north of Skarbimierz
  - coordinates: 53°42′48″N 15°59′25″E
- Mouth: Mogilica
  - location: northeast of Redło
  - coordinates: 53.7861°N 15.9732°E

Basin features
- Progression: Mogilica→ Parsęta→ Baltic Sea

Grudzianka is a river in the Łobeska Plateau of north-western Poland, a left tributary of the Mogilica. The source is located about 0.5 km north of the Skarbimierz settlement. It runs north through the towns of: Bronowo, Szeligowo, Sucha, and Redło, behind which it flows into Mogilica. The area from the source to Bronów was included in the area of special protection of birds "Ostoja Drawska".

The name Grudzianka was officially introduced in 1948, replacing the previous German name Hugel Bach.
