= Radew =

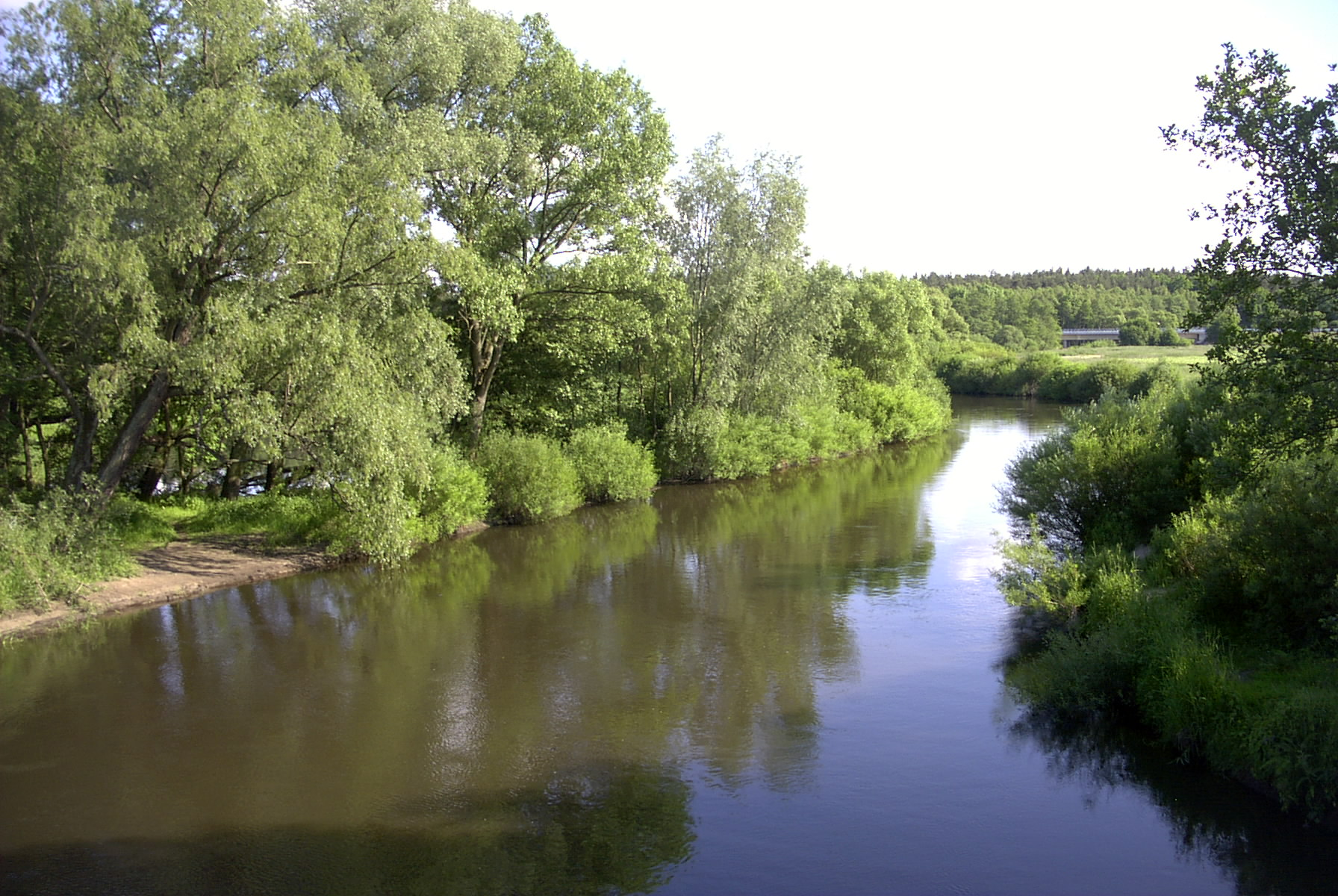

Location
- Country: Poland

Physical characteristics
- Mouth
  - location: Parsęta
  - coordinates: 54°02′15″N 15°52′12″E

Basin features
- Progression: Parsęta→ Baltic Sea

Radew is a river of Poland, a tributary of the Parsęta in Karlino.
