= Petrus Pachius =

German protestant minister (1579–1641/42)

- Born: 1579; Kohlberg
- Died: 1641/42; Stockholm, Sweden
- Occupations: Protestant pastor Teacher; Poet
- Spouse: y
- Children: y

Petrus Pachius (1579 – 1641/42) was a German protestant minister, teacher and poet.

== Life ==
Pachius was born in Kohlberg, a port city on the northern coast of West Pomerania, slightly less than four decades before the outbreak of the Thirty Years' War. He studied, probably at Greifswald University or at Wittenberg University. Sources differ. On 14 September 1614 he became deputy rector of the cathedral school in Kohlberg. He also served for three years as the minister in charge at the Holy Ghost church in Kohlberg.

In May 1629 Pachius with his wife and children left Kolberg. It is not known why. They relocated via Königsberg and Kalmar to Stockholm, arriving in the Swedish capital just as the Swedish king was preparing to descend on northern Germany, backed by the Swedish army. Pachius was able to continue his career in Stockholm where he would die roughly twelve years later. He took a job as head of a school, one of several German schools in the city that encountered local opposition from people identifying it as a "Winkelschule" (loosely translated: private school).

Pachius published poems in both Latin and German, given opus numbers 1 - 120 and published between 1629 and 1643. On top of that, in 1638 he published, "Salutaris Jesu Christi Nativitas", a Christmas Play in German. This was translated into Swedish by Ericus Kolmodinus, extended into a six act drama and published in 1659 without reference to the earlier German language text by Pachius.
