= Kołobrzeg Pier =

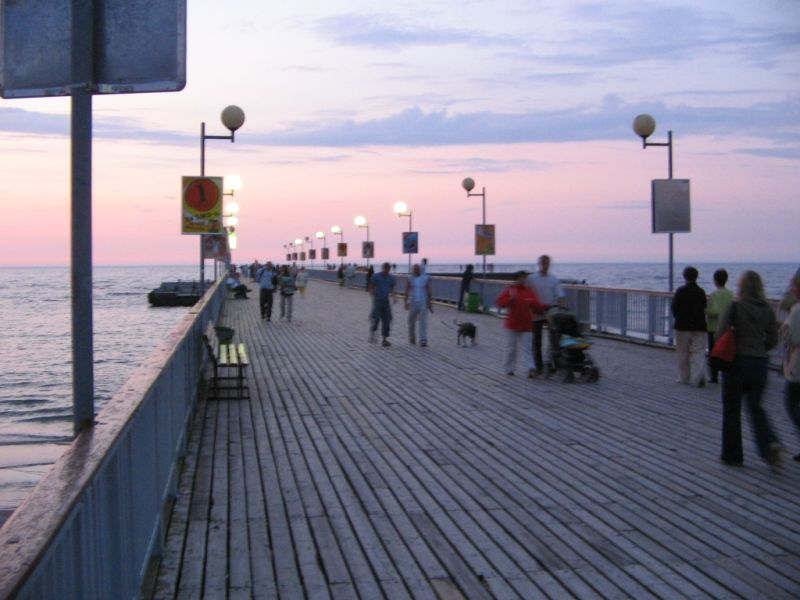
- Kołobrzeg Pier
- Type: Pleasure Pier
- Coordinates: 54.11°N 15.35°E
- Official name: Molo w Kołobrzegu

Characteristics
- Total length: 220 metres (720 ft)

History
- Opening date: June 19, 1971

The Kołobrzeg Pier (Polish: Molo w Kołobrzegu) is a reinforced concrete pier in Kołobrzeg, Poland. The structure has a length of 220 metres and the width of 9 metres and the pavilion is located about 4,5 metres above sea level. The pier was reopened after extensive renovation and modernisation works on November 27, 2014 and further works of the adjacent area were completed a year later.

The first pier in Kołobrzeg was built in 1881. This was a wooden T-shaped construction, of about 100 metres in length. There was a jetty for sailing ships located on the end of the pier. The historic pier was partially destroyed during World War II.

The current pier was officially opened on June 19, 1971. A jetty, for small holiday barques located on the end of the pier allows for small sail sightseeing tour ships. The Kołobrzeg Pier is one of the main attractions of the town.

Plans exist to construct an additional pier, of about 260 meters in length, on the west side of the town as an extension of the Plażowa street and eventually connect both of the locations together via a water tram.

In 2019 an official tender has been published by the local authorities to develop an architectural concept of about a 50 meter long pier in osiedle Podczele, on the east side of the town, to cover an existing rain water sewerage system.
