= Mogilica (river) =

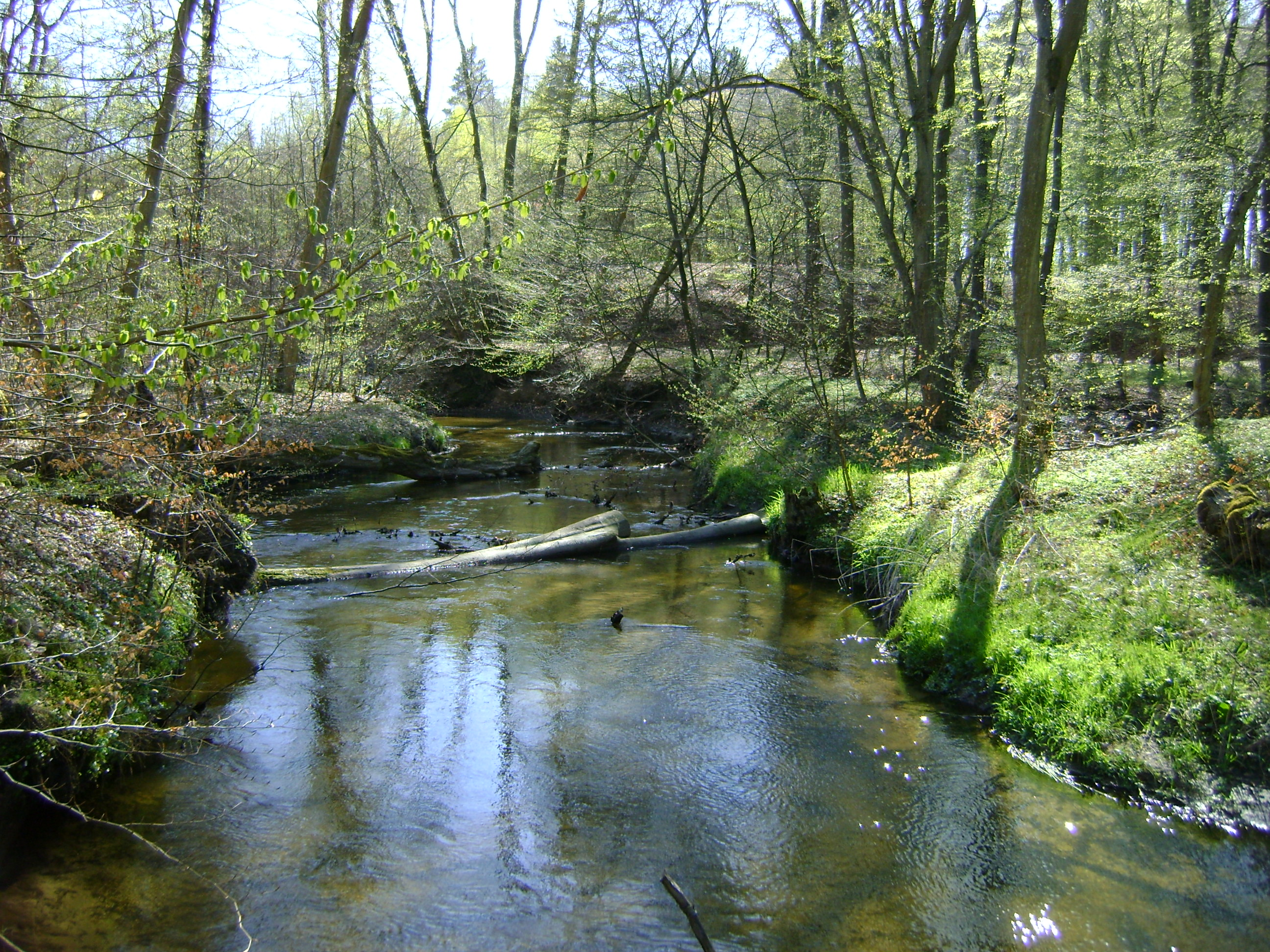
- Mogilica near Czarnowęsy

Location
- Country: Poland
- Voivodeship: West Pomeranian

Physical characteristics
- Source
  - location: west of Zajączkowo, Świdwin County
  - coordinates: 53°44′05″N 16°01′01″E
- Mouth: Parsęta
  - location: northeast of Dębczyno, Białogard County
  - coordinates: 53.9827°N 16.0066°E
- Length: 44 km (27 mi)
- Basin size: 150.43 km^{2} (58.08 mi^{2})

Basin features
- Progression: Parsęta→ Baltic Sea

Mogilica is a river of Poland, a tributary of the Parsęta near Dębczyno.

== See also ==
- Grudzianka (river)
- Świerznica (river)
