= Port of Kołobrzeg =

Seaport in Poland

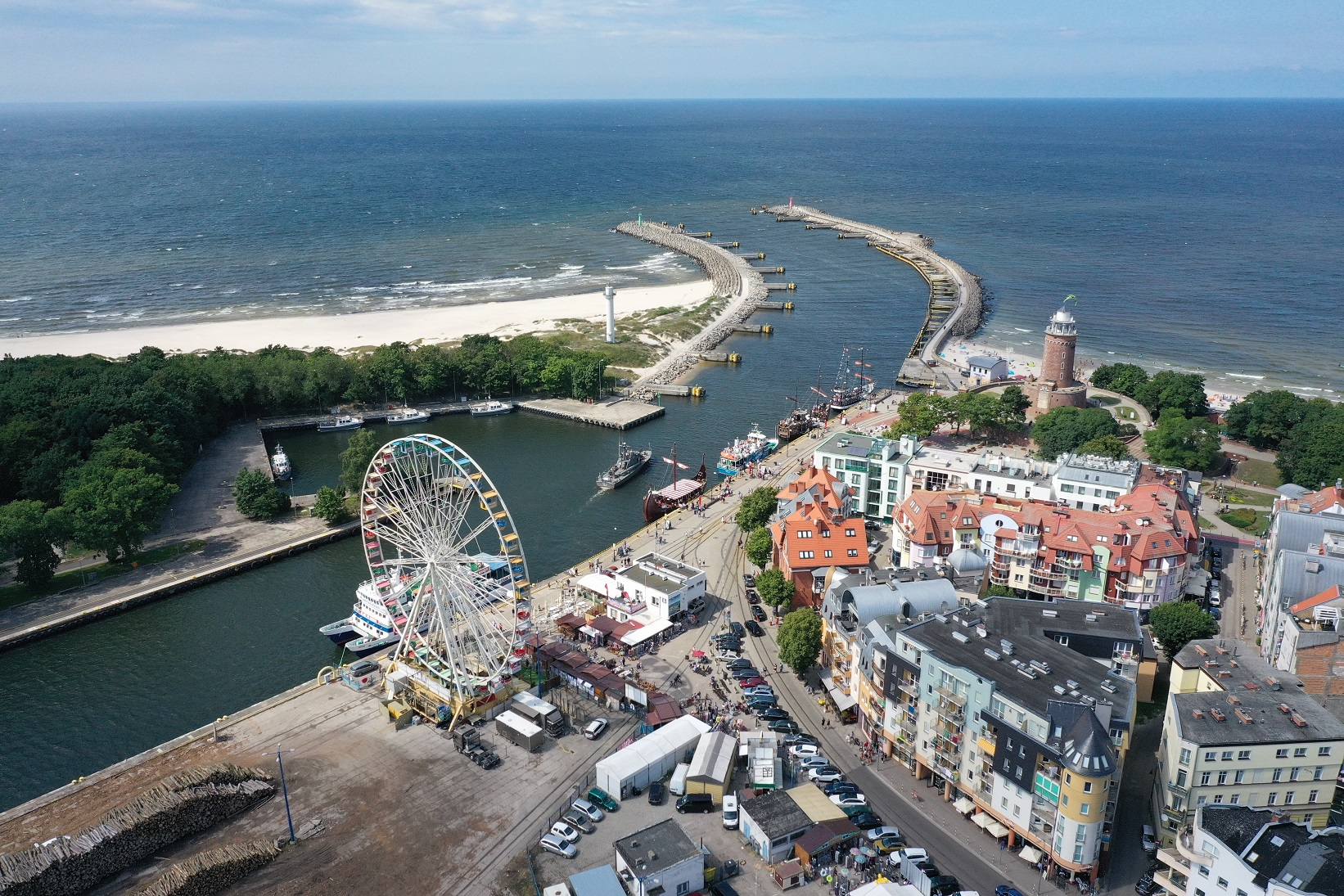
- Aerial view of the entrance to the Port of Kołobrzeg (2021)
- Click on the map for a fullscreen view

Location
- Country: Poland
- Location: Kołobrzeg
- Coordinates: 54°10′46″N 15°33′19″E
- UN/LOCODE: PLKOL

Details
- Opened: 13th century
- Operated by: Kołobrzeg Seaport Authority, Polish Navy
- Owned by: City of Kołobrzeg, Polish Navy

Statistics
- Annual cargo tonnage: 277,800 (2023)
- Passenger traffic: 290,000 (2022)

The Port of Kołobrzeg [kɔˈwɔbʐɛk] (in Polish generally Port Kołobrzeg) is a Polish seaport in Kołobrzeg, Poland at the Baltic Sea located at the Parsęta river. Port has a yacht harbour, fishing harbour, ferry harbour.

A lighthouse stands on "Fort Ujście"; it was built after the World War II. The old lighthouse was standing ~20 meters closer to sea. When Germans were evacuating from Kołobrzeg, they destroyed the old lighthouse because it was a strategic point for allies.

In 2023, cargo traffic in the seaport equaled 277,800 tons.

In 2022, the port recorded 290,000 passengers.

== Gallery ==
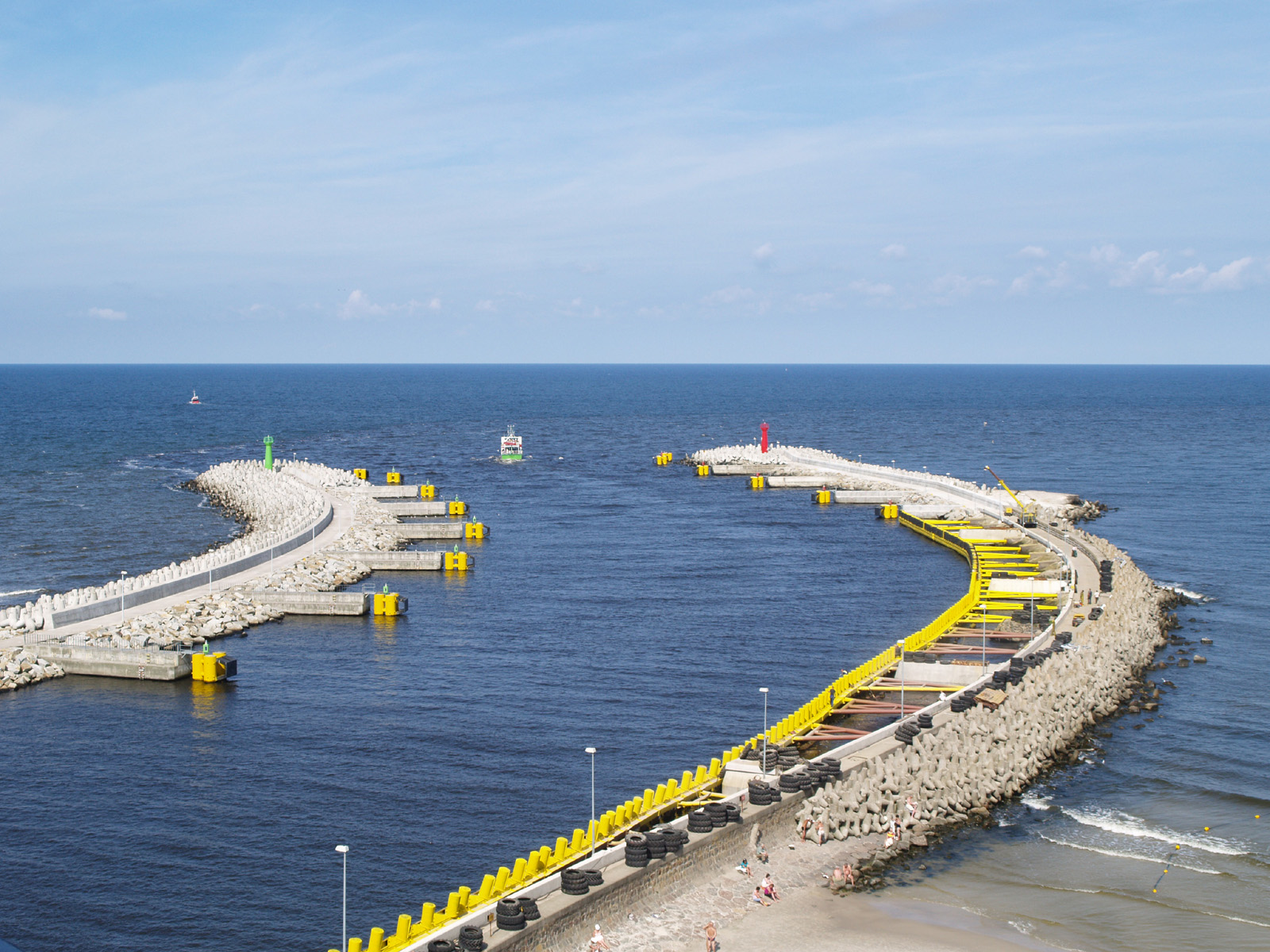
Breakwater at the mouth of river Parsęta

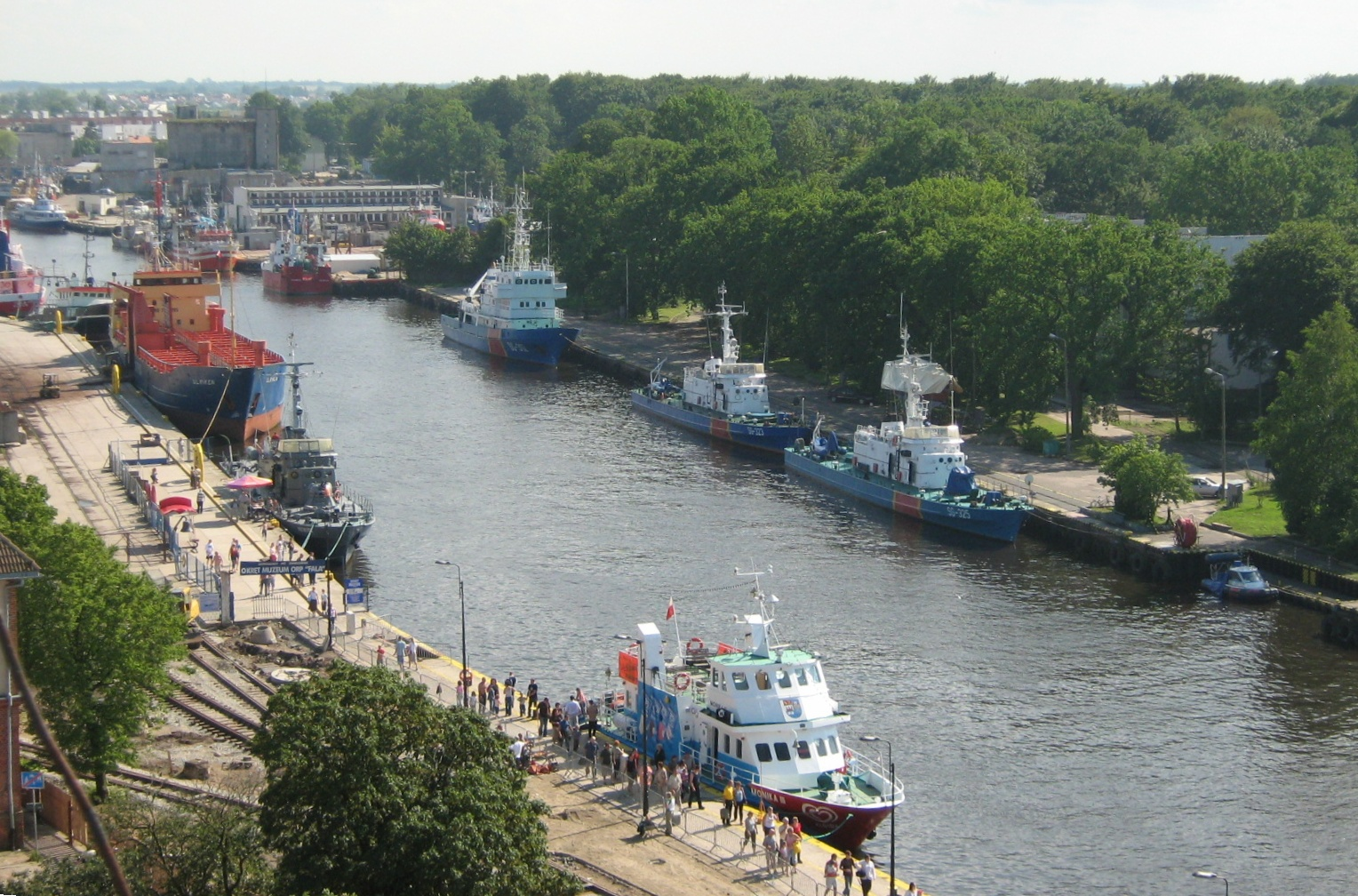

== See also ==
- Ports of the Baltic Sea
