= Parsęta =

River in Poland

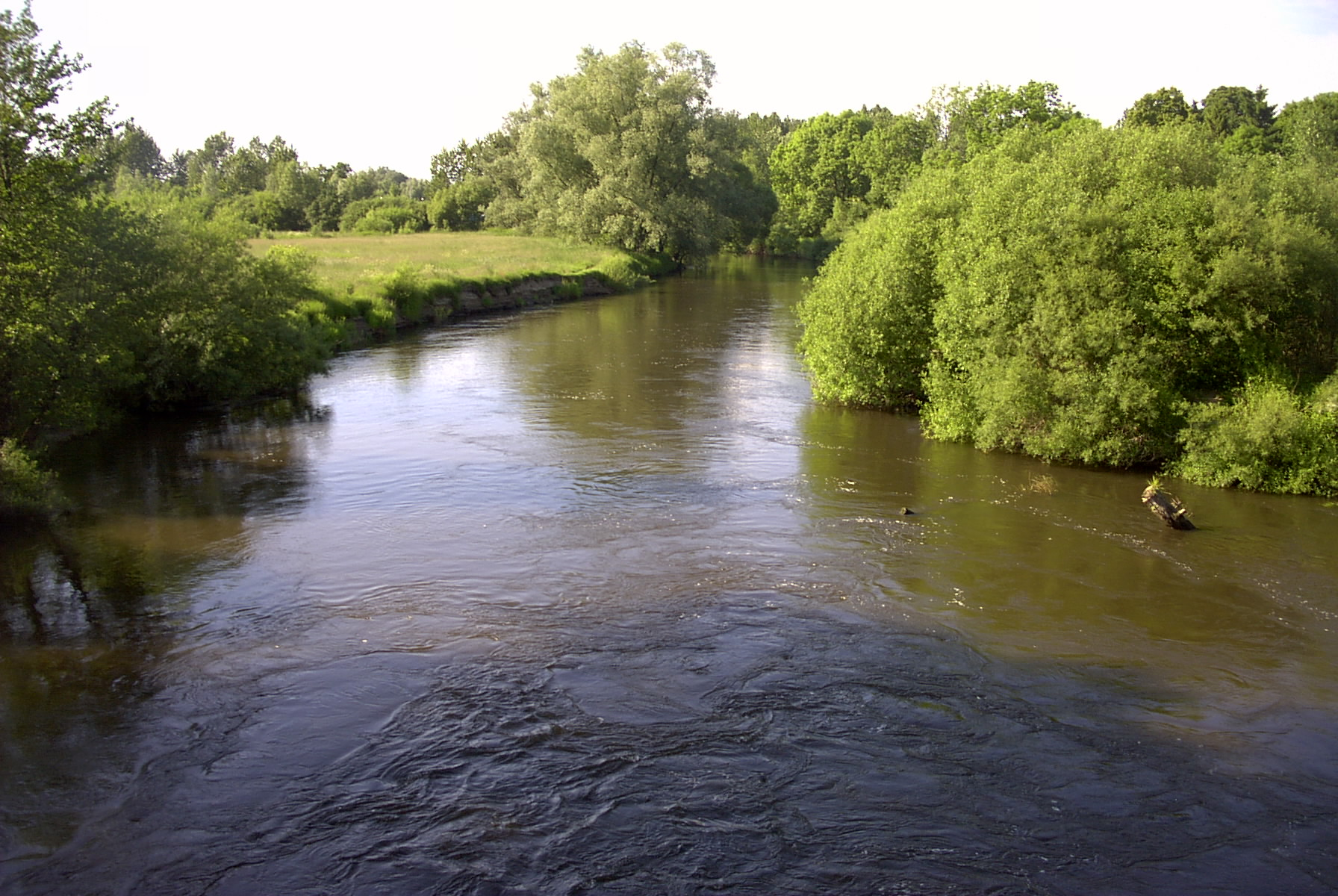
- Parsęta near Karlino

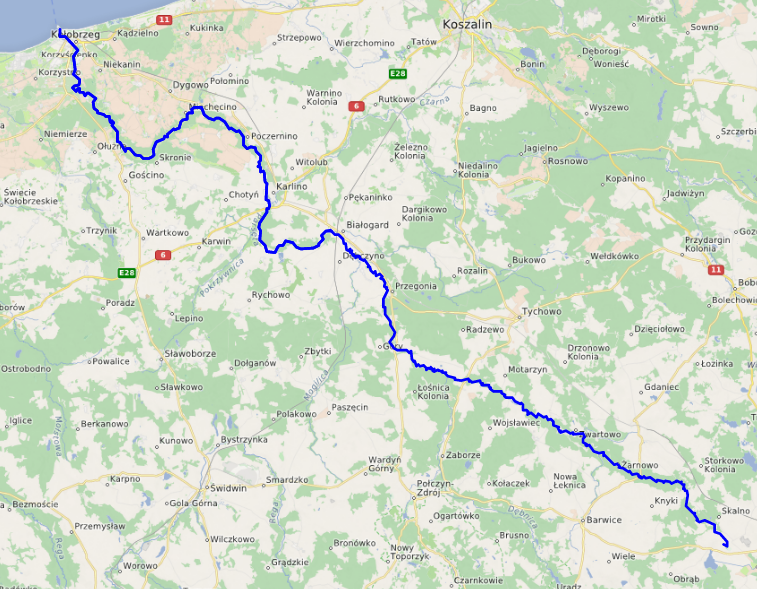

Location
- Country: Poland

Physical characteristics
- Source
  - location: Parsęcko near Szczecinek
  - coordinates: 53°43′9″N 16°35′12″E
  - elevation: 137 m (449 ft)
- Mouth
  - location: Baltic Sea at Kołobrzeg
  - coordinates: 54°11′18″N 15°33′4″E
- Length: 143 km (89 mi)
- Basin size: 3,084 km^{2} (1,191 sq mi)
- Discharge
  - average: 29.1 m^{3}/s (1,030 cu ft/s)

Parsęta (Polish pronunciation: [parˈsɛnta]; German: Persante pronounced [pɛʁˈzantə]) is a river in the West Pomeranian Voivodeship (Zachodniopomorskie) of north-western Poland, with a length of 143 km (89 mi) and a basin area of 3,084 km^{2} (1,191 sq mi). It flows into the Baltic Sea.

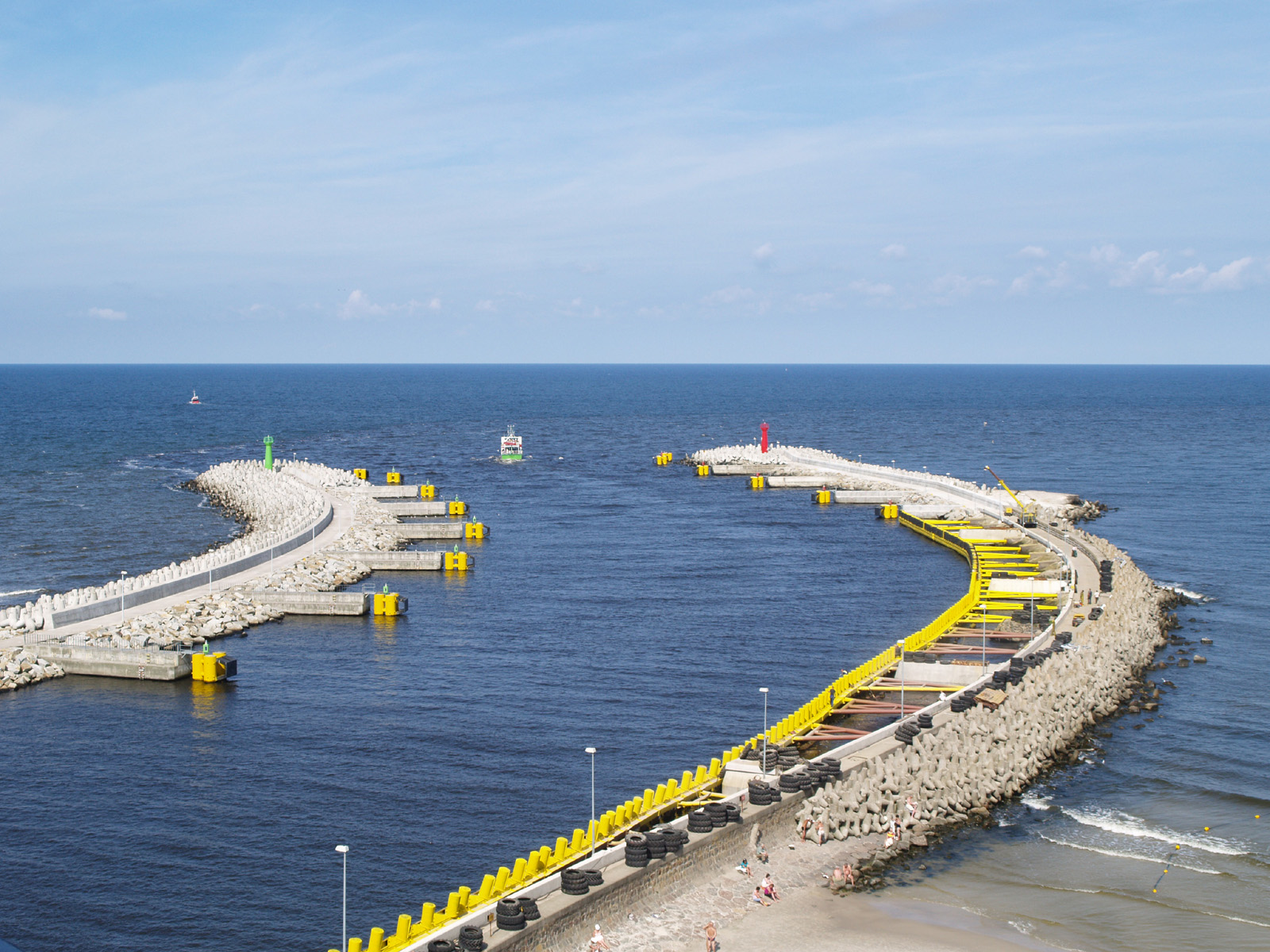
Parsęta - Port of Kołobrzeg (August 2010)

Towns:

- Białogard
- Kołobrzeg
- Karlino

Tributaries:

- Bukowa
- Radew
- Mogilica

== See also ==
- Rivers of Poland
- List of rivers of Europe
