= Belgard District =

The Belgard District (German: Landkreis Belgard, Kreis Belgard) is a former district in Eastern Pomerania that existed from 1818 to 1945. The Belgard District belonged, successively, to Prussia, the German Empire, the Weimar Republic and the Third Reich. The district seat was the town of Belgard on the bank of Persante. The area under this former district is now split between two powiats: Białogard and Świdwin Counties, both of which are under the Polish West Pomeranian Voivodeship.

== History ==
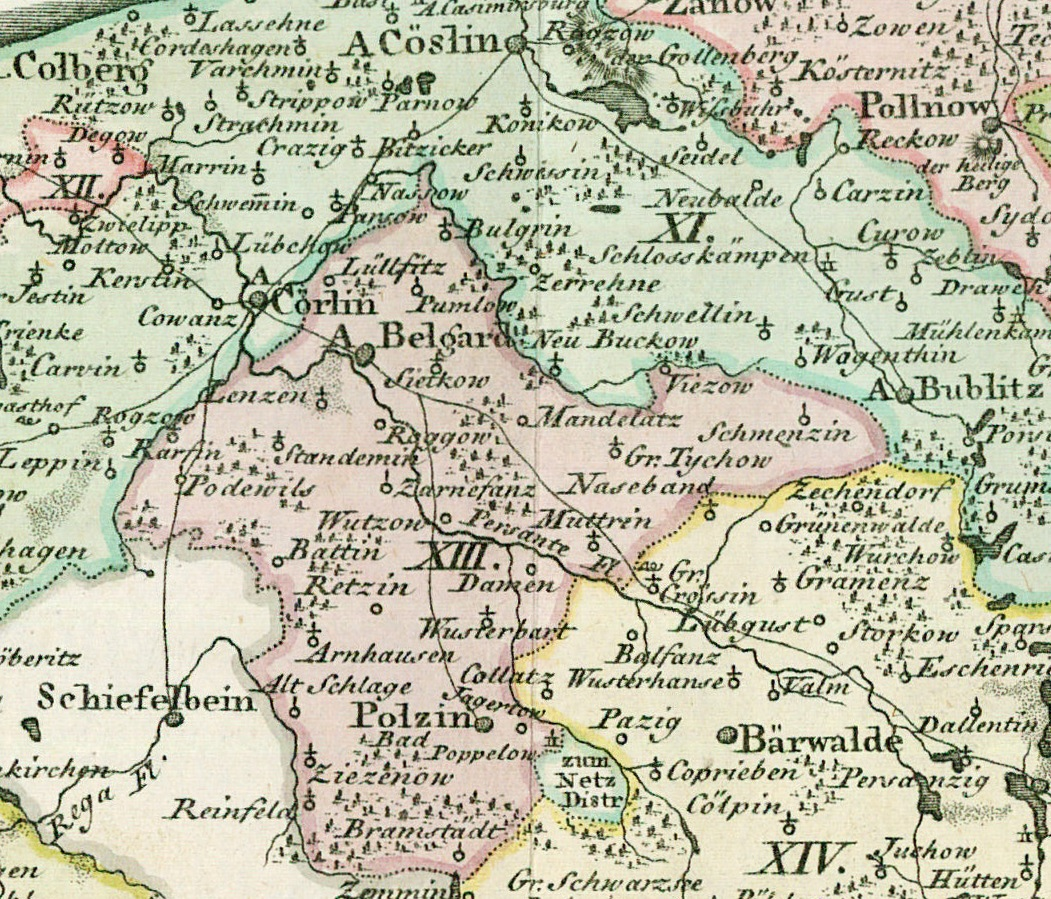
Belgard-Polzin district in the 18th century

In Pomerania, which had belonged to Brandenburg-Prussia since 1648, a district reform was carried out in 1724. The number of districts and associated district councils were significantly reduced in order lessen the strong territorial fragmentation that had arisen as a result of the complicated aristocratic possessions in Eastern Pomerania. The existing Belgard and Polzin districts were merged into Belgard-Polzinscher district on January 1, 1725. The district included the towns of Belgard and Polzin, the royal office of Belgard, and a large number of noble villages and estates.

As a result of the Prussian provincial authority decree of April 30, 1815, the district became a part of the region of Köslin in the Province of Pomerania. With the Pomeranian district reform of 1818, two villages of Brutzen and Groß Poplow under Netze District of West Prussia were added, and the district was renamed Belgard district after the seat of the district government. In 1828, the villages of Jagertow and Kollatz, which until then were in communion districts of Belgard and Neustettin, were fully integrated into the Belgard district.

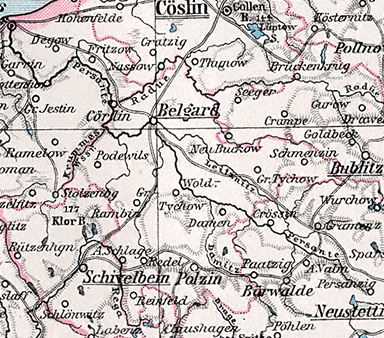
The district area in 1905

In 1871, Belgard district included the towns of Belgard and Polzin, 73 rural communities as well as 95 estate districts. On September 30, 1929, as with the rest of the Free State of Prussia, a territorial reform took place in the Belgard district, in which all independent estate districts were dissolved and assigned to nrighboring rural communities.

In 1910, Belgard district covered an area of 1,132 square kilometers. With the Prussian district reform of October 1, 1932, the district was significantly enlarged in the following ways:

- With the exception of the three communities of Labenz, Nuthagen and Rützow, the dissolved Schivelbein district was incorporated into Belgard district;
- The Neu Buckow district, consisting of the three communities Groß Satspe, Klein Satspe and Neu Buckow, were transferred from the dissolved Bublitz district to the Belgard district.

In the further course of the 1930s, the district name Belgard (Persante) was introduced. On January 1, 1939, Belgard (Persante) district received the designation of Landkreis in accordance with the now uniform Reich regulation. As of 1939, a total of 79,183 inhabitants lived in the district of 1,649.49 square kilometers, with a population density of 48 inhabitants per square kilometers. 48% of the population lived in the three cities of Belgard (16,456), Bad Polzin (6,920) and Schivelbein (9,714). In terms of area, the district was the fourth largest in the province of Pomerania, and fifth in terms of population size.

In the spring of 1945, the district was controlled by the Red Army. After the end of World War II, the district was transferred from Soviet to Polish administration in the summer of 1945.

== Demographics ==
Historic population
Year	Population	Source
1797	16,682	
1816	18,808	
1846	33,528	
1871	44,102	
1890	44,547	
1900	47,097	
1910	48,504	
1925	53,918	
1933	76,894	
1939	77,062	

== Politics ==
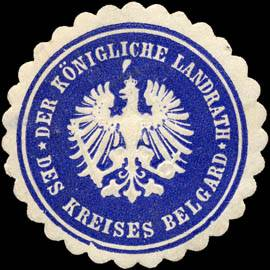
District of Belgard: seal mark of the district administrator

=== District administrators ===
Term begin	Term end	Name
1723	Unknown	Caspar von Wolden
1747	1753	Hans Joachim von Kleist
1753	1762	Ernst Friedrich von Podewils
1763	1770	Caspar Friedrich von Ramel
1772	1787	Friedrich Wilhelm von Winterfeld
1787	1808	Otto Bogislaff von Kleist
1808	1844	Hans Jürgen von Kleist-Retzow
1844	1851	Hans Hugo von Kleist-Retzow
1851	1865	Wilhelm von der Reck
1868	1884	Hans Wilhelm von Hagen
1886	1897	Jürgen von Kleist-Retzow
1899	1911	Wolf Friedrich von Kleist-Retzow
1911	1919	Gustav von Hagen
1919	1921	Carl Ahrendts
1921	1922	Walter Fehrmann
1923	1932	Hans Janzen
1932	1933	Walter Braun
1934	1935	Otto Busse
1935	1945	Erich Mehliß

=== Local government ===
The Belgard district was divided into towns, rural communities, and - until their complete dissolution in 1929 - into independent estate districts. With the introduction of the Prussian municipal constitution law on December 15, 1933, there was a uniform municipal constitution for all Prussian municipalities starting January 1, 1934. Following the introduction of the German Municipal Code on January 30, 1935, a uniform municipal constitution came into effect on April 1, according to which the previous state municipalities were now referred to as municipalities, and they were grouped into county-level divisions called Amtsbezirk. However, new county constitution was no created, so the district regulations created on March 19, 1881 for the provinces of East and West prussia, Brandenburg, Pomerania, Silesia and Saxony still applied.

== Districts, cities and communities ==
=== Administrative districts ===
The rural communities of the district were divided into 40 Amtsbezirk in 1932. The towns of the district were not included.

List of Amtsbezirks as of 1932
Alt Schlage	Arbhausen	Ballenberg	Bramstädt
Briesen	Brunow	Bulgrin	Burzlaff
Buslar	Dubberow	Groß Poplow	Groß Rambin
Groß Tychow	Grüssow	Kamissow	Klanzig
Kollatz	Kreitzig	Kösternitz	Langenhaken
Lankow	Lülfitz	Nelep	Neu Buckow
Pumlow	Rarfin	Redel	Reinfeld
Roggow	Schlenzig	Schlönwitz	Schmenzin
Simmatzig	Standemin	Vietzow	Warnin
Wopersnow	Wusterbarth	Zadtkow	Zarnefanz

=== Cities and communes ===
At the end of its existence in 1945, Belgard district included three towns: Belgard, Bad Polzin and Schivelbein. There were also 126 municipalities:

List of municipalities as of 1945
Alt Lülfitz	Alt Sanskow	Alt Schlage	Arnhausen
Ballenberg	Balsdrey	Battin	Berkenow
Boissin	Bolkow	Boltenhagen	Bramstädt
Briesen	Brunow	Brutzen	Buchhorst
Bulgrin	Burzlaff	Buslar	Butzke
Damen	Damerow	Darkow	Denzin
Dohnafelde	Döbel	Drenow	Dubberow
Eichenfelde	Gauerkow	Glötzin	Groß Panknin
Groß Rambin	Groß Satspe	Groß Tychow	Grössin
Grüssow	Gumtow	Hohenwardin	Jagertow
Kamissow	Karsbaum	Kartlow	Kavelsberg
Kieckow	Klein Panknin	Klein Rambin	Klein Satspe
Klempin	Klemzow	Klötzin	Klützkow
Kollatz	Kowalk	Kösternitz	Kreitzig
Kussenow	Langen	Lankow	Lasbeck
Latzig	Leckow	Lenzen	Liepz
Lutzig	Mandelatz	Meseritz	Muttrin
Naffin	Natztow	Nelep	Nemmin
Neu Buckow	Neu Lülfitz	Neu Sanskow	Panzerin
Podewils	Polchlep	Poplow	Pribslaff
Pumlow	Pustchow	Quisbernow	Rarfin
Redel	Redlin	Reinfeld	Repzin
Retzin	Ristow	Ritzig	Roggow
Rostin	Röhlshof	Rützenhagen	Sager
Schinz	Schlenin	Schlenzig	Schlönwitz
Schmenzin	Semerow	Siedkow	Silesen
Simmatzig	Standemin	Technow	Teschenbusch
Tietzow	Venzlaffshagen	Vietzow	Vorbruch
Vorwerk	Völzkow	Warnin	Wartenstein
Wopersnow	Wussow	Wusterbarth	Wutzow
Zadtkow	Zarnefanz	Zietlow	Ziezeneff
Zuchen	Zwirnitz		

=== Dissolved estates ===
- Groß Dubberow, incorporated by Dubberow in the 1920s.
- Klein Krössin, converted into an estate district around 1908.
- Rottow, integrated into Mandelatz around 1908.
- Groß Poplow, integrated into Poplow around 1928.

=== Name changes ===
- Seeligsfelde was renamed Eichenfelde on December 29, 1937.

== Religion ==
The population of Belgard district has belonged almost entirely to the Protestant faith since the Reformation. In the census of May 17, 1939, 96.6% of the inhabitants identified themselves with Protestantism. The proportion of Roman Catholic Christians was 1.4%, and Gottgläubigen (God believers) made up 0.9%.

=== Protestant church ===
The parishes in the district belonged to the ecclesiastical province of Pomerania of the Prussian Union of Churches. There were two church districts within the district's territory, namely Belgard and Schivelbein, whose boundaries largely coincided with those of the two former districts prior to 1932.

In 1931, the parishes of Karvin, Kerstin and Körlin were abolished, and the area was all integrated into the church district of Belgard. Meanwhile, Groß and Klein Satspe belonged to the parish of Seeger in the parish of Körlin; Tietzow and EWarnin were governed by the Schwellin parish in the Bublitz church district. When in the course of the dissolution of the district of Schivelbein Labenz, Nuthagen and Rützow were transferred to the district of Dramburg, the parishes of Labenz and Rützow remained with the church district of Schivelbein. Schlenzig became part of Petershagen in the church district of Kolberge and Ritzig, and would later become part of Wusterwitz in the church district of Dramburg.

With 58,750 members, the Belgard church district was one of the largest in the province. It comprised 18 parishes with 19 branch parishes with 22 pastors, 39 churches and 4 chapels.

The parish of Schivelbein had 26,689 parishioners in 13 parishes with 21 branch parishes, 14 pastors and 34 churches.

With the end of the Second World War, the number of Germans and thus also of evangelical Christians dwindled to a minimum. They were looked after by the parish office in Koszalin and belonged to the Diocese of Pomerania-Greater Poland of the Evangelical Church of the Augsburg Confession in Poland. In the Belgard Goergen Church, which now belongs to the Catholic Church in Poland, regular Protestant services are held in both Polish and German.

=== Catholic Church ===
In the first centuries after the Reformation, there were practically no Catholics in the Belgard area. In the middle of the 19th century, it is still reported that the few Catholic Christians in the Belgard district were cared for from time to time by clergymen from the Catholic community in Köslin or Kolberg.

From 1887, Holy Masses were held in Belgard in an inn hall. Church building plans fell through. In 1915, the first post-Reformation Catholic priest took office in Belgard. In a carriage shed of a master blacksmith, there was a room that was sufficient as an emergency church.

On November 12, 1920, the foundation stone of a new church was laid, and the topping-out ceremony was celebrated on December 16, 1920. After the parish apartment could be occupied on July 25, 1921, the ceremonial consecration of the new church on Pankniner Straße took place on August 24, 1921. In 1925, the community had around 300 members.

In the summer of 1945, St. Mary's Church and St. George's Church in Belgard were dedicated to the Polish Catholic Church. The small church on Pankniner Straße was only used for communion and vicarage.

In Schivelbein with a catchment area to Dramburg and Rummelsburg, a dedicated pastor was hired in 1863. A private apartment rented in 1858 served as the chapel room. In 1868 the rented chapel was replaced by a separate mission house with a chapel, school and apartment under one roof. In 1883 the congregation was left to its own devices due to a lack of priests, and masses were held sporadically in Kolberg and Köslin.

It was not until 1900 that the community received its own pastor again. At the time, Schivelbein had 29 Catholics among its 7,700 inhabitants. In 1925 there were 50 Schivelberiners among 400 members of the entire parish.

=== Jewish religious community ===
In 1826 a synagogue was built in Belgarder Jägerstraße. Until the First World War, there was neither overt nor hidden antisemitism. That changed in the 1920s, when the son of the master baker Klotz was shot during the Kapp Putsch in Heerstrasse, it was claimed that the fatal shot had come from a Jewish house, that of Herr Moses. Only gradually after this event did the situation calm down again.

The community had about 130 members in 1933. A boycott day was proclaimed on April 1, 1933, and SA men gathered in front of all Jewish shops. But at the time, there were repeated rallies of sympathy for the Jews.

== Traffic ==
Belgard and the former district town of Schivelbein had already been connected in 1859 to the Stargard–Köslin line of the Berlin-Stettiner Eisenbahn-Gesellschaft line (111), as well as the 111n branch line to Kolberg.

A line of Prussian Eastern Railway was connected to the town in 1878. In 1897, the Prussian State Railways ran a branch line from Schivelbein to Bad Polzin (111m); From there it was built in 1903 on the one hand to Gramenz and on the other hand to Falkenburg (111k+m).

Finally, the district town of Belgard became the starting point for two narrow-gauge railways, which were put into operation by the “ United Small Railways of the Districts of Köslin, Bublitz, Belgard ” in 1905 to Schwellin in the district of Köslin and in 1909 to Rarfin (113v+w).

== Notable people ==
- Rudolf Virchow (1821 - 1902), German physician and politician, was born in Schivelbein. His mother came from Belgard.

== Galleries ==
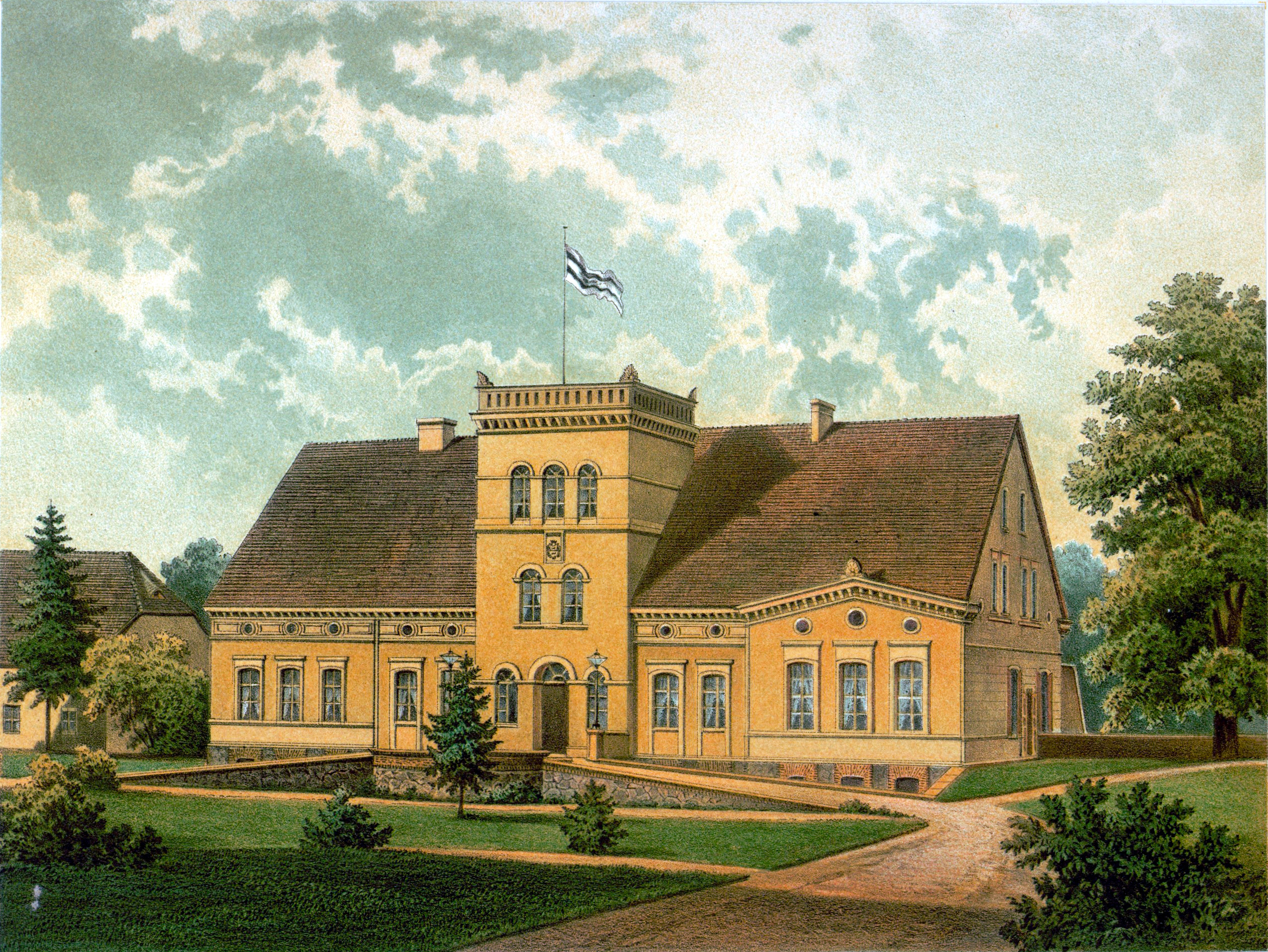
Schmenzin Manor around 1860, Alexander Duncker Collection

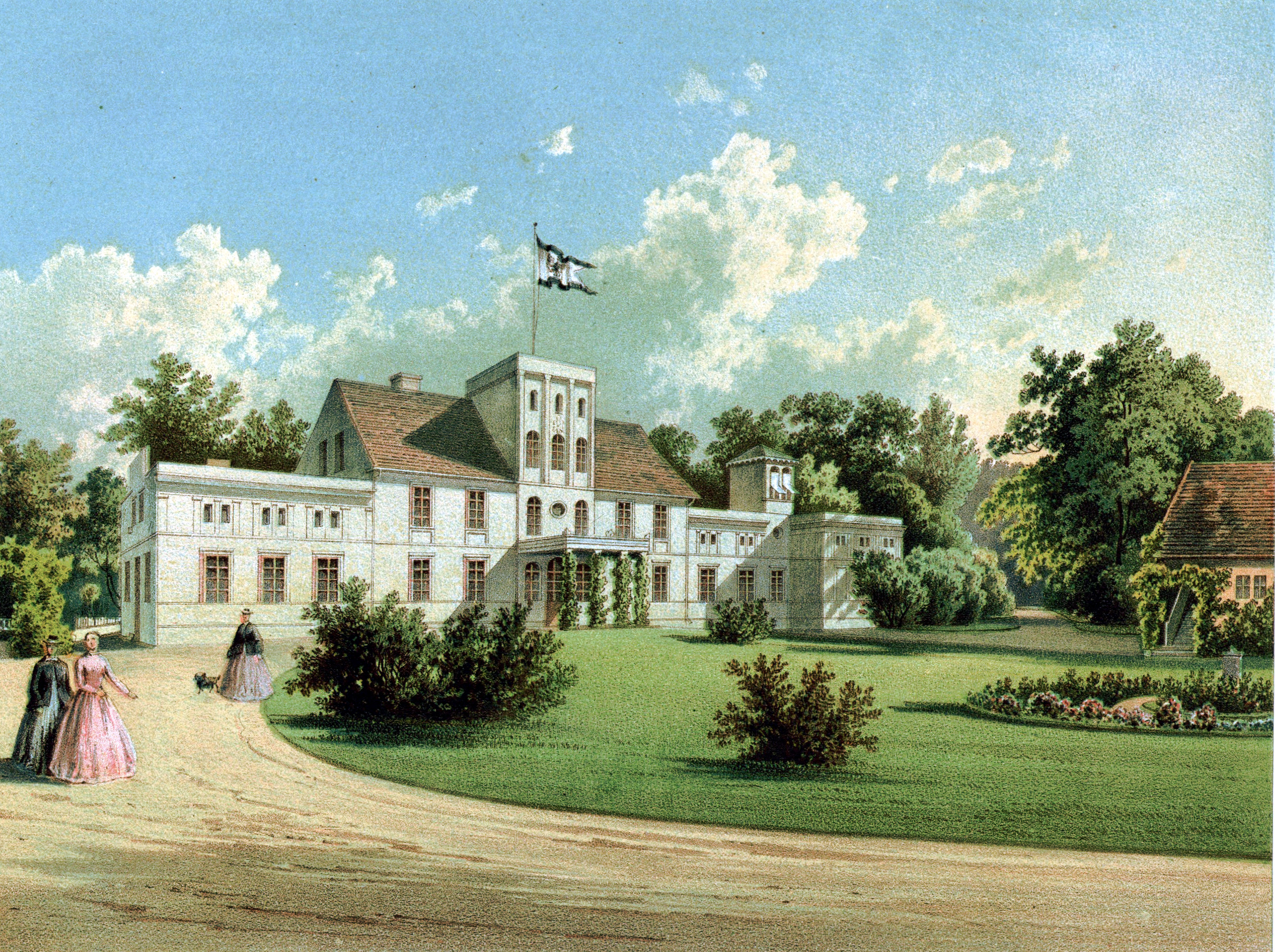
Manor Redel around 1860, Alexander Duncker Collection

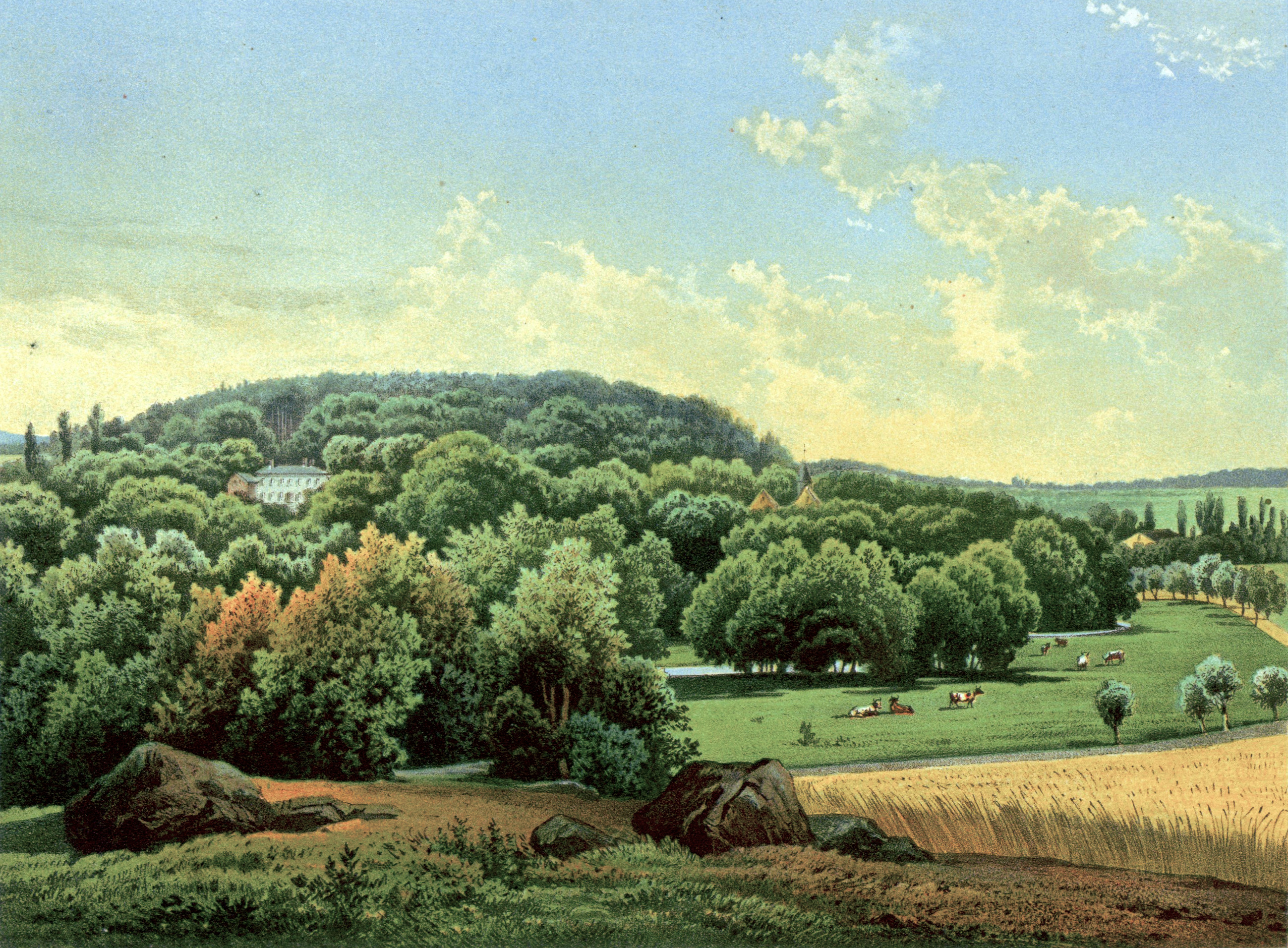
Siedkow Manor around 1860, Alexander Duncker Collection
