= Wronie Gniazdo =

- Settlement
- Location within Poland
- Coordinates: 54°3′42″N 16°6′41″E
- Country: Poland
- Voivodeship: West Pomeranian
- County: Białogard
- Gmina: Białogard

Wronie Gniazdo [ˈvrɔɲɛ ˈɡɲazdɔ] (German: Krähenkrug) is a settlement in the administrative district of Gmina Białogard, within Białogard County, West Pomeranian Voivodeship, in north-western Poland. It lies approximately 11 km (7 mi) north-east of Białogard and 124 km (77 mi) north-east of the regional capital Szczecin.

For the history of the region, see History of Pomerania.
