= Stajkowo, West Pomeranian Voivodeship =

Stajkowo
- Settlement
- Location within Poland
- Coordinates: 54°5′25″N 16°4′8″E
- Country: Poland
- Voivodeship: West Pomeranian
- County: Białogard
- Gmina: Białogard

Stajkowo [stai̯ˈkɔvɔ] (German: Krausenkathen) is a settlement in the administrative district of Gmina Białogard, within Białogard County, West Pomeranian Voivodeship, in north-western Poland. It lies approximately 12 km (7 mi) north-east of Białogard and 124 km (77 mi) north-east of the regional capital Szczecin.

For the history of the region, see History of Pomerania.
