= Rychowo =

- Village
- Location within Poland
- Coordinates: 53°56′41″N 15°50′21″E
- Country: Poland
- Voivodeship: West Pomeranian
- County: Białogard
- Gmina: Białogard

Rychowo [rɨˈxɔvɔ] is a village in the administrative district of Gmina Białogard, within Białogard County, West Pomeranian Voivodeship, in north-western Poland. It lies approximately 12 km (7 mi) south-west of Białogard and 102 km (63 mi) north-east of the regional capital Szczecin.

For the history of the region, see History of Pomerania.
