= Góry, West Pomeranian Voivodeship =

Góry
- Village
- Location within Poland
- Coordinates: 53°54′5″N 16°2′26″E
- Country: Poland
- Voivodeship: West Pomeranian
- County: Białogard
- Gmina: Białogard

Góry [ˈɡurɨ] is a village in the administrative district of Gmina Białogard, within Białogard County, West Pomeranian Voivodeship, in north-western Poland. It lies approximately 12 km (7 mi) south of Białogard and 111 km (69 mi) north-east of the regional capital Szczecin.

For the history of the region, see History of Pomerania.
