= Przegonia =

- Settlement
- Location within Poland
- Coordinates: 53°57′12″N 16°3′36″E
- Country: Poland
- Voivodeship: West Pomeranian
- County: Białogard
- Gmina: Białogard

Przegonia [pʂɛˈɡɔɲa] (German: Heidekrug) is a settlement in the administrative district of Gmina Białogard, within Białogard County, West Pomeranian Voivodeship, in north-western Poland. It lies approximately 8 km (5 mi) south-east of Białogard and 115 km (71 mi) north-east of the regional capital Szczecin.

For the history of the region, see History of Pomerania.
