= Liskowo, Białogard County =

Liskowo
- Settlement
- Location within Poland
- Coordinates: 53°54′2″N 16°3′29″E
- Country: Poland
- Voivodeship: West Pomeranian
- County: Białogard
- Gmina: Białogard

Liskowo [lisˈkɔvɔ] is a settlement in the administrative district of Gmina Białogard, within Białogard County, West Pomeranian Voivodeship, in north-western Poland. It lies approximately 13 km (8 mi) south-east of Białogard and 112 km (70 mi) north-east of the regional capital Szczecin.

For the history of the region, see History of Pomerania.
