= Rychówko =

- Village
- Location within Poland
- Coordinates: 53°55′56″N 15°52′36″E
- Country: Poland
- Voivodeship: West Pomeranian
- County: Białogard
- Gmina: Białogard

Rychówko [rɨˈxufkɔ] (German: Klein Reichow) is a village in the administrative district of Gmina Białogard, within Białogard County, West Pomeranian Voivodeship, in north-western Poland. It lies approximately 11 km (7 mi) south-west of Białogard and 103 km (64 mi) north-east of the regional capital Szczecin.

For the history of the region, see History of Pomerania.
