= Wygoda, West Pomeranian Voivodeship =

Wygoda
- Settlement
- Location within Poland
- Coordinates: 53°55′33″N 16°3′45″E
- Country: Poland
- Voivodeship: West Pomeranian
- County: Białogard
- Gmina: Białogard
- Time zone: UTC+1 (CET)
  - Summer (DST): UTC+2 (CEST)
- Vehicle registration: ZBI

Wygoda [vɨˈɡɔda] (German: Posthaus) is a settlement in the administrative district of Gmina Białogard, within Białogard County, West Pomeranian Voivodeship, in north-western Poland. It lies approximately 10 km (6 mi) south-east of Białogard and 113 km (70 mi) north-east of the regional capital Szczecin.
