= Moczyłki =

- Village
- Location within Poland
- Coordinates: 53°58′37″N 16°2′7″E
- Country: Poland
- Voivodeship: West Pomeranian
- County: Białogard
- Gmina: Białogard

Moczyłki [mɔˈt͡ʂɨu̯ki] is a village in the administrative district of Gmina Białogard, within Białogard County, West Pomeranian Voivodeship, in north-western Poland. It lies approximately 5 km (3 mi) south-east of Białogard and 115 km (71 mi) north-east of the regional capital Szczecin.

For the history of the region, see History of Pomerania.
