= Białogórzynko =

- Settlement
- Location within Poland
- Coordinates: 54°5′50″N 16°4′47″E
- Country: Poland
- Voivodeship: West Pomeranian
- County: Białogard
- Gmina: Białogard

Białogórzynko [bjawɔɡuˈʐɨnkɔ] (German: Bulgrin) is a settlement in the administrative district of Gmina Białogard, within Białogard County, West Pomeranian Voivodeship, in north-western Poland. It lies approximately 13 km (8 mi) north-east of Białogard and 125 km (78 mi) north-east of the regional capital Szczecin.

== See also ==
History of Pomerania
