= Strzelec, West Pomeranian Voivodeship =

Strzelec
- Settlement
- Location within Poland
- Coordinates: 54°4′28″N 16°0′51″E
- Country: Poland
- Voivodeship: West Pomeranian
- County: Białogard
- Gmina: Białogard

Strzelec [ˈstʂɛlɛt͡s] (German: Fier) is a settlement in the administrative district of Gmina Białogard, within Białogard County, West Pomeranian Voivodeship, in north-western Poland. It lies approximately 9 km (6 mi) north of Białogard and 120 km (75 mi) north-east of the regional capital Szczecin.

For the history of the region, see History of Pomerania.

== Geography ==
The settlement is located approximately 1 km northwest of Pustków, near railway line no. 202.
