= Łęczenko =

- Settlement
- Location within Poland
- Coordinates: 53°58′52″N 15°57′37″E
- Country: Poland
- Voivodeship: West Pomeranian
- County: Białogard
- Gmina: Białogard

Łęczenko [wɛnˈt͡ʂɛnkɔ] (German: Lenzen Wiesenhof) is a settlement in the administrative district of Gmina Białogard, within Białogard County, West Pomeranian Voivodeship, in north-western Poland. It lies approximately 3 km (2 mi) south-west of Białogard and 111 km (69 mi) north-east of the regional capital Szczecin.

For the history of the region, see History of Pomerania.
