= Leśniki, West Pomeranian Voivodeship =

Leśniki
- Settlement
- Location within Poland
- Coordinates: 54°3′57″N 15°59′57″E
- Country: Poland
- Voivodeship: West Pomeranian
- County: Białogard
- Gmina: Białogard

Leśniki [lɛɕˈniki] is a settlement in the administrative district of Gmina Białogard, within Białogard County, West Pomeranian Voivodeship, in north-western Poland. It lies approximately 8 km (5 mi) north of Białogard and 118 km (73 mi) north-east of the regional capital Szczecin.

For the history of the region, see History of Pomerania.
