= Pustkówko =

- Settlement
- Location within Poland
- Coordinates: 54°3′48″N 16°0′29″E
- Country: Poland
- Voivodeship: West Pomeranian
- County: Białogard
- Gmina: Białogard

Pustkówko [pustˈkufkɔ] is a settlement in the administrative district of Gmina Białogard, within Białogard County, West Pomeranian Voivodeship, in north-western Poland. It lies approximately 8 km (5 mi) north of Białogard and 119 km (74 mi) north-east of the regional capital Szczecin.

For the history of the region, see History of Pomerania.
