= Trzebiele, Białogard County =

Trzebiele
- Settlement
- Location within Poland
- Coordinates: 54°1′31″N 15°56′0″E
- Country: Poland
- Voivodeship: West Pomeranian
- County: Białogard
- Gmina: Białogard

Trzebiele [tʂɛˈbjɛlɛ] (German: Komet) is a settlement in the administrative district of Gmina Białogard, within Białogard County, West Pomeranian Voivodeship, in north-western Poland. It lies approximately 5 km (3 mi) north-west of Białogard and 112 km (70 mi) north-east of the regional capital Szczecin.

For the history of the region, see History of Pomerania.
