= Ristow =

Ristow may refer to:

Place name

- Rzyszczewo, Białogard County, pronounced as 'Ristow', township in Poland, district of Białogard
- Rzyszczewo, Sławno County, pronounced as 'Ristow', township in Poland, district of Sławno

Family name

- Christian Ristow, robotic and kinetic artist
- Luiz Eduardo Ristow, veterinarian and researcher
- Michael Ristow (born 1967), German physician and researcher
- Harold C. Ristow, former member of South Dakota State Senate
- Peter Ristow, German interior designer (Köln)
- Susanne Ristow, German artist (Düsseldorf)
- Walter Ristow, librarian and author
