= Łęczynko =

- Settlement
- Location within Poland
- Coordinates: 53°59′36″N 15°57′21″E
- Country: Poland
- Voivodeship: West Pomeranian
- County: Białogard
- Gmina: Białogard

Łęczynko [wɛnˈt͡ʂɨnkɔ] (German: Vorwerk Lenzen) is a settlement in the administrative district of Gmina Białogard, within Białogard County, West Pomeranian Voivodeship, in north-western Poland. It lies approximately 2 km (1 mi) west of Białogard and 111 km (69 mi) north-east of the regional capital Szczecin.

For the history of the region, see History of Pomerania.
