= Tarpnowo =

- Settlement
- Location within Poland
- Coordinates: 53°57′10″N 15°58′36″E
- Country: Poland
- Voivodeship: West Pomeranian
- County: Białogard
- Gmina: Białogard

Tarpnowo [tarpˈnɔvɔ] (German: Tarpenow) is a settlement in the administrative district of Gmina Białogard, within Białogard County, West Pomeranian Voivodeship, in north-western Poland. It lies approximately 6 km (4 mi) south of Białogard and 110 km (68 mi) north-east of the regional capital Szczecin.

For the history of the region, see History of Pomerania.
