= Rzyszczewo =

Rzyszczewo may refer to:

- Rzyszczewo, Białogard County, Poland
- Rzyszczewo, Sławno County, Poland
