= Żabiniec, West Pomeranian Voivodeship =

Żabiniec
- Settlement
- Location within Poland
- Coordinates: 53°59′3″N 15°56′26″E
- Country: Poland
- Voivodeship: West Pomeranian
- County: Białogard
- Gmina: Białogard

Żabiniec [ʐaˈbiɲɛt͡s] (German: Wiesenhof) is a settlement in the administrative district of Gmina Białogard, within Białogard County, West Pomeranian Voivodeship, in north-western Poland. It lies approximately 4 km (2 mi) south-west of Białogard and 110 km (68 mi) north-east of the regional capital Szczecin.

For the history of the region, see History of Pomerania.
