= Byszyno =

- Village
- Location within Poland
- Coordinates: 53°56′55″N 16°2′49″E
- Country: Poland
- Voivodeship: West Pomeranian
- County: Białogard
- Gmina: Białogard

Byszyno [bɨˈʂɨnɔ] (German: Boissin) is a village in the administrative district of Gmina Białogard, within Białogard County, West Pomeranian Voivodeship, in north-western Poland. It lies approximately 8 km (5 mi) south-east of Białogard and 114 km (71 mi) north-east of the regional capital Szczecin.

== See also ==
- History of Pomerania

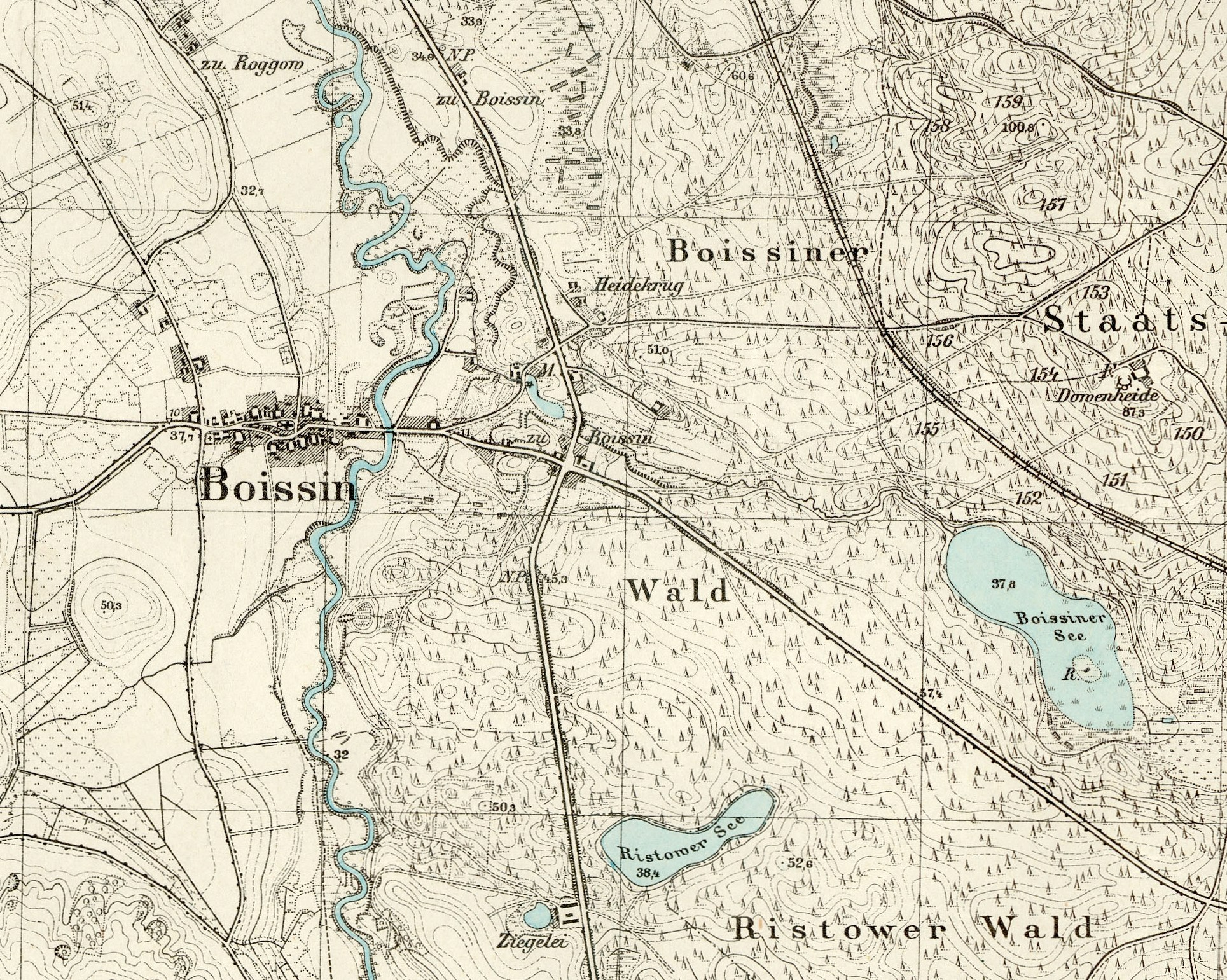
Boissin (Byszyno) in 1891
