= Ewald von Kleist =

Ewald von Kleist may refer to any of the following persons:

- Ewald Georg von Kleist (c. 1700–1748), co-inventor of the Leyden jar
- Ewald Christian von Kleist (1715–1759), German poet and soldier
- Paul Ludwig Ewald von Kleist (1881–1954), German field marshal
- Ewald von Kleist-Schmenzin (1890–1945), conspirator in the 20 July plot to assassinate Adolf Hitler
- Ewald-Heinrich von Kleist-Schmenzin (1922–2013), son of Count Ewald von Kleist-Schmenzin; conspirator in the 20 July plot
