= Gmina Białogard =

Gmina Białogard Białogard Commune
- Gmina
- Flag Coat of arms
- Interactive map of Gmina Białogard
- Coordinates (Białogard): 54°0′N 15°59′E
- Country: Poland
- Voivodeship: West Pomeranian
- County: Białogard
- Seat: Białogard

Area
  - Total: 327.93 km^{2} (126.61 sq mi)

Population (2006)
  - Total: 7,758
  - Density: 23.66/km^{2} (61.27/sq mi)
- Website: http://www.gmina-bialogard.pl/

Gmina Białogard is a rural gmina (administrative district) in Białogard County, West Pomeranian Voivodeship, in north-western Poland. Its seat is the town of Białogard, although the town is not part of the territory of the gmina.

The gmina covers an area of 327.93 square kilometres (126.6 sq mi), and as of 2006 its total population is 7,758.

== Villages ==
Gmina Białogard contains the villages and settlements of Białogórzynko, Białogórzyno, Buczek, Byszyno, Czarnowęsy, Dargikowo, Dębczyno, Góry, Gruszewo, Kamosowo, Klępino Białogardzkie, Kościernica, Laski, Łęczenko, Łęczno, Łęczynko, Leśniki, Liskowo, Lulewice, Lulewiczki, Moczyłki, Nasutowo, Nawino, Nosówko, Pękaninko, Pękanino, Podwilcze, Pomianowo, Przegonia, Pustkówko, Pustkowo, Rarwino, Redlino, Rogowo, Rościno, Rychówko, Rychowo, Rzyszczewo, Sińce, Stajkowo, Stanomino, Strzelec, Tarpnowo, Trzebiec, Trzebiele, Wronie Gniazdo, Wygoda, Żabiniec, Ząbki, Zagórze, Zaspy Małe, Żeleźno, Żelimucha and Żytelkowo.

== Neighbouring gminas ==
Gmina Białogard is bordered by the town of Białogard and by the gminas of Biesiekierz, Karlino, Połczyn-Zdrój, Rąbino, Sławoborze, Świeszyno and Tychowo.
