= Dobrowo =

- Village
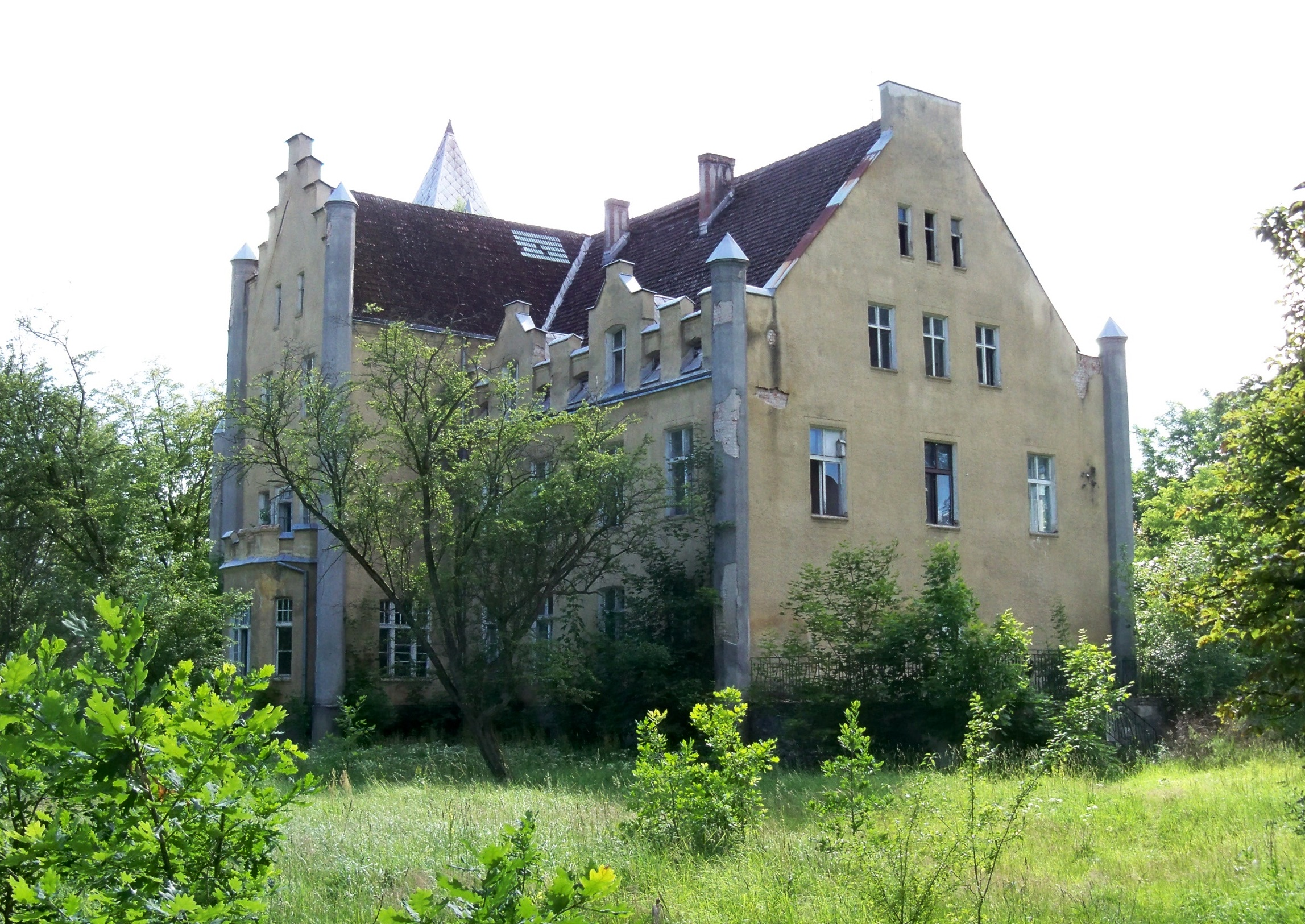
- Dobrowo Palace

- Location within Poland
- Coordinates: 53°59′N 16°7′E
- Country: Poland
- Voivodeship: West Pomeranian
- County: Białogard
- Gmina: Tychowo

Population
  - Total: 770
- Time zone: UTC+1 (CET)
  - Summer (DST): UTC+2 (CEST)
- Vehicle registration: ZBI

Dobrowo [dɔˈbrɔvɔ] is a village in the administrative district of Gmina Tychowo, within Białogard County, West Pomeranian Voivodeship, in north-western Poland. It lies approximately 12 km (7 mi) north-west of Tychowo, 9 km (6 mi) east of Białogard, and 120 km (75 mi) north-east of the regional capital Szczecin.

It is located in the historic region of Pomerania.

The village has a population of 770.

== Notable residents ==
- Ewald von Kleist-Schmenzin (1890 – 1945), resistance fighter
