= Żeleźno =

- Village
- Location within Poland
- Coordinates: 54°3′8″N 16°3′41″E
- Country: Poland
- Voivodeship: West Pomeranian
- County: Białogard
- Gmina: Białogard
- Population: 220

Żeleźno [ʐɛˈlɛʑnɔ] (German Silesen) is a village in the administrative district of Gmina Białogard, within Białogard County, West Pomeranian Voivodeship, in north-western Poland. It lies approximately 8 km (5 mi) north-east of Białogard and 121 km (75 mi) north-east of the regional capital Szczecin.

For the history of the region, see History of Pomerania.
