= Kościernica, Białogard County =

Kościernica
- Village
- Location within Poland
- Coordinates: 54°2′50″N 16°1′6″E
- Country: Poland
- Voivodeship: West Pomeranian
- County: Białogard
- Gmina: Białogard

Kościernica [kɔɕt͡ɕɛrˈnit͡sa] (German: Kösternitz) is a village in the administrative district of Gmina Białogard, within Białogard County, West Pomeranian Voivodeship, in north-western Poland. It lies approximately 6 km (4 mi) north-east of Białogard and 118 km (73 mi) north-east of the regional capital Szczecin.

For the history of the region, see History of Pomerania.
