= Klępino Białogardzkie =

- Village
- Location within Poland
- Coordinates: 53°59′55″N 16°3′32″E
- Country: Poland
- Voivodeship: West Pomeranian
- County: Białogard
- Gmina: Białogard

Klępino Białogardzkie [klɛmˈpinɔ bjawɔˈɡart͡skʲɛ] (German Klempin) is a village in the administrative district of Gmina Białogard, within Białogard County, West Pomeranian Voivodeship, in north-western Poland. It lies approximately 5 km (3 mi) east of Białogard and 117 km (73 mi) north-east of the regional capital Szczecin.

For the history of the region, see History of Pomerania.
