= Zaspy Wielkie =

- Village
- Location within Poland
- Coordinates: 54°1′N 16°12′E
- Country: Poland
- Voivodeship: West Pomeranian
- County: Białogard
- Gmina: Tychowo

Zaspy Wielkie [ˈzaspɨ ˈvjɛlkʲɛ] (German: Groß Satspe) is a village in the administrative district of Gmina Tychowo, within Białogard County, West Pomeranian Voivodeship, in north-western Poland. It lies approximately 11 km (7 mi) north-west of Tychowo, 15 km (9 mi) east of Białogard, and 126 km (78 mi) north-east of the regional capital Szczecin.

== See also ==
- History of Pomerania
