= Dargikowo =

- Village
- Location within Poland
- Coordinates: 54°0′58″N 16°3′40″E
- Country: Poland
- Voivodeship: West Pomeranian
- County: Białogard
- Gmina: Białogard

Dargikowo [darɡiˈkɔvɔ] (German: Darkow) is a village in the administrative district of Gmina Białogard, within Białogard County, West Pomeranian Voivodeship, in north-western Poland. It lies approximately 6 km (4 mi) east of Białogard and 118 km (73 mi) north-east of the regional capital Szczecin.

== See also ==
History of Pomerania
