= Stanomino =

- Village
- Location within Poland
- Coordinates: 53°57′27″N 15°53′54″E
- Country: Poland
- Voivodeship: West Pomeranian
- County: Białogard
- Gmina: Białogard

Stanomino [stanɔˈminɔ] (German Standemin) is a village in the administrative district of Gmina Białogard, within Białogard County, West Pomeranian Voivodeship, in north-western Poland. It lies approximately 8 km (5 mi) south-west of Białogard and 106 km (66 mi) north-east of the regional capital Szczecin.

For the history of the region, see History of Pomerania.
