= Laski, Białogard County =

Laski
- Village
- Location within Poland
- Coordinates: 53°56′43″N 15°55′13″E
- Country: Poland
- Voivodeship: West Pomeranian
- County: Białogard
- Gmina: Białogard
- Population: 140

Laski (Polish pronunciation: [ˈlaskʲi]; German: Latzig) is a village in the administrative district of Gmina Białogard, within Białogard County, West Pomeranian Voivodeship, in north-western Poland. It lies approximately 8 km (5 mi) south-west of Białogard and 106 km (66 mi) north-east of the regional capital Szczecin.
