= Bukówko =

- Village
- Location within Poland
- Coordinates: 53°59′5″N 16°11′32″E
- Country: Poland
- Voivodeship: West Pomeranian
- County: Białogard
- Gmina: Tychowo
- Population: 320

Bukówko [buˈkufkɔ] (German: Neu Buckow) is a village in the administrative district of Gmina Tychowo, within Białogard County, West Pomeranian Voivodeship, in north-western Poland. It lies approximately 8 km (5 mi) north-west of Tychowo, 14 km (9 mi) east of Białogard, and 124 km (77 mi) north-east of the regional capital Szczecin.

The village has a population of 320.
