= Flag of Białogard =

Symbol of Białogard, Poland

Białogard
- Proportion: 5:8
- Adopted: 3 March 2004

The flag, which serves as the symbol of the city of Białogard, West Pomeranian Voivodeship, in western Poland, is divided into three horizontal stripes, including a blue stripe in the middle, and two white stripes, twice its size, placed on top and bottom, and with two light red rhombuses, each placed in the left corner of white stripe. The flag was established in 2004.

== Design ==
The flag of the town of Białogard is divided into three horizontal stripes, which are: a blue stripe in the middle, with a height of 1/5 of the height of the flag, and two white stripes, one on the top, and one on the bottom, both with the height of 2/5 of the height of the flag.

In both of the white fields, in their left corners, is placed a light red symmetrical rhombus. The length of its longer horizontal diagonal line is equal to 2/8 of the height of the flag, and the length of its shorter vertical diagonal line is equal 1/5 of the height of the flag. The top and bottom angles of the rhombus have 120 decrees each, and the left and right angles have 60 degrees each. Each rhombus is placed in the middle of the height of the white field, and at a distance from the left edge of the flag, equal to 1/5 of the height of the flag. Around the edges of the flag is a thin blue border. The flag proportions have the aspect ratio of its height to its width equal to 5:8.

The blue stripe on the flag symbolizes the location of the town of Białogard on the Parsęta river, while two red rhombuses symbolize the historical association of the town with the Hanseatic League. Colours blue, red, and white are also colours of the coat of arms of Białogard.

== History ==
The flag was established by the Białogard City Council on 3 March 2004.
