= Dębczyno =

- Village
- Location within Poland
- Coordinates: 53°58′49″N 16°0′7″E
- Country: Poland
- Voivodeship: West Pomeranian
- County: Białogard
- Gmina: Białogard

Dębczyno [dɛmpˈt͡ʂɨnɔ] (German: Denzin) is a village in the administrative district of Gmina Białogard, within Białogard County, West Pomeranian Voivodeship, in north-western Poland. It lies approximately 3 km (2 mi) south-east of Białogard and 113 km (70 mi) north-east of the regional capital Szczecin.

For the history of the region, see History of Pomerania.
