= Podwilcze =

- Village
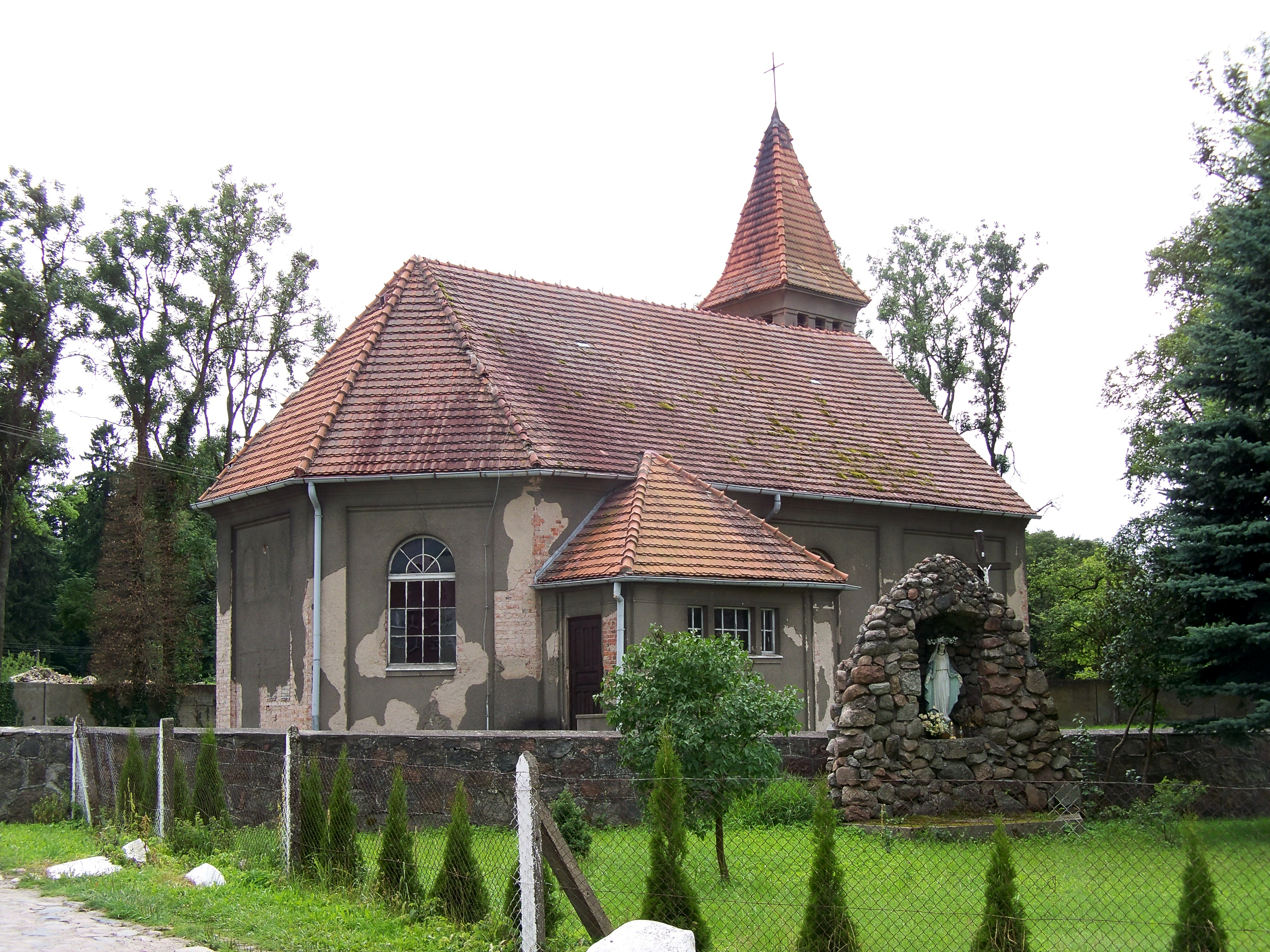
- Former Lutheran, currently Catholic Church of Saint Martin

- Location within Poland
- Coordinates: 53°56′5″N 15°49′33″E
- Country: Poland
- Voivodeship: West Pomeranian
- County: Białogard
- Gmina: Białogard

Podwilcze [pɔdˈvilt͡ʂɛ] (German: Podewils) is a village in the administrative district of Gmina Białogard, within Białogard County, West Pomeranian Voivodeship, in north-western Poland. It lies approximately 13 km (8 mi) south-west of Białogard and 101 km (63 mi) north-east of the regional capital Szczecin.

For the history of the region, see History of Pomerania.
