= Pomianowo, West Pomeranian Voivodeship =

Pomianowo
- Village
- Location within Poland
- Coordinates: 54°2′5″N 16°3′27″E
- Country: Poland
- Voivodeship: West Pomeranian
- County: Białogard
- Gmina: Białogard

Pomianowo [pɔmjaˈnɔvɔ] (German Pumlow) is a village in the administrative district of Gmina Białogard, within Białogard County, West Pomeranian Voivodeship, in north western Poland. It lies approximately 7 km (4 mi) north-east of Białogard and 119 km (74 mi) north-east of the regional capital Szczecin.

For the history of the region, see History of Pomerania.
