= Pękanino, Białogard County =

Pękanino
- Village
- Location within Poland
- Coordinates: 54°1′30″N 15°59′17″E
- Country: Poland
- Voivodeship: West Pomeranian
- County: Białogard
- Gmina: Białogard
- Population: 40

Pękanino [pɛnkaˈninɔ] (German: Groß Panknin) is a village in the administrative district of Gmina Białogard, within Białogard County, West Pomeranian Voivodeship, in north-western Poland. It lies approximately 3 km (2 mi) north of Białogard and 115 km (71 mi) north-east of the regional capital Szczecin.

For the history of the region, see History of Pomerania.

The village has a population of 40.
