= Rogowo, Białogard County =

Rogowo
- Village
- Location within Poland
- Coordinates: 53°58′3″N 16°1′6″E
- Country: Poland
- Voivodeship: West Pomeranian
- County: Białogard
- Gmina: Białogard

Rogowo [rɔˈɡɔvɔ] (German Roggow) is a village in the administrative district of Gmina Białogard, within Białogard County, West Pomeranian Voivodeship, in north-western Poland. It lies approximately 5 km (3 mi) south-east of Białogard and 113 km (70 mi) north-east of the regional capital Szczecin.

For the history of the region, see History of Pomerania.
