= Pękaninko =

- Village
- Location within Poland
- Coordinates: 54°2′11″N 15°59′24″E
- Country: Poland
- Voivodeship: West Pomeranian
- County: Białogard
- Gmina: Białogard
- Population: 30

Pękaninko [pɛnkaˈninkɔ] is a village in the administrative district of Gmina Białogard, within Białogard County, West Pomeranian Voivodeship, in north-western Poland. It lies approximately 5 km (3 mi) north of Białogard and 116 km (72 mi) north-east of the regional capital Szczecin.

For the history of the region, see History of Pomerania.

The village has a population of 30.
