= Gruszewo =

- Village
- Location within Poland
- Coordinates: 53°56′47″N 15°57′32″E
- Country: Poland
- Voivodeship: West Pomeranian
- County: Białogard
- Gmina: Białogard
- Time zone: UTC+1 (CET)
  - Summer (DST): UTC+2 (CEST)

Gruszewo [ɡruˈʂɛvɔ] (German Grüssow) is a village in the administrative district of Gmina Białogard, within Białogard County, West Pomeranian Voivodeship, in north-western Poland. It lies approximately 7 km (4 mi) south of Białogard and 109 km (68 mi) north-east of the regional capital Szczecin.

== History ==
During World War II, the Germans operated a forced labour subcamp of the Stalag II-D prisoner-of-war camp in the village.
