= Nasutowo =

- Village
- Location within Poland
- Coordinates: 53°58′48″N 15°51′42″E
- Country: Poland
- Voivodeship: West Pomeranian
- County: Białogard
- Gmina: Białogard

Nasutowo [nasuˈtɔvɔ] (German Natztow) is a village in the administrative district of Gmina Białogard, within Białogard County, West Pomeranian Voivodeship, in north-western Poland. It lies approximately 9 km (6 mi) west of Białogard and 105 km (65 mi) north-east of the regional capital Szczecin.

For the history of the region, see History of Pomerania.
