= Nosówko =

- Village
- Location within Poland
- Coordinates: 54°5′26″N 16°3′8″E
- Country: Poland
- Voivodeship: West Pomeranian
- County: Białogard
- Gmina: Białogard

Nosówko [nɔˈsufkɔ] (German: Nassow Bahnhof) is a village in the administrative district of Gmina Białogard, within Białogard County, West Pomeranian Voivodeship, in north-western Poland. It lies approximately 12 km (7 mi) north-east of Białogard and 123 km (76 mi) north-east of the regional capital Szczecin.

For the history of the region, see History of Pomerania.
