= Czarnowęsy =

- Village
- Location within Poland
- Coordinates: 53°56′10″N 16°0′17″E
- Country: Poland
- Voivodeship: West Pomeranian
- County: Białogard
- Gmina: Białogard

Czarnowęsy [t͡ʂarnɔˈvɛ̃sɨ] (German: Zarnefanz) is a village in the administrative district of Gmina Białogard, within Białogard County, West Pomeranian Voivodeship, in north-western Poland. It lies approximately 8 km (5 mi) south of Białogard and 111 km (69 mi) north-east of the regional capital Szczecin.

== See also ==
History of Pomerania
