= Kamosowo =

- Village
- Location within Poland
- Coordinates: 53°59′2″N 15°53′59″E
- Country: Poland
- Voivodeship: West Pomeranian
- County: Białogard
- Gmina: Białogard

Kamosowo [kamɔˈsɔvɔ] (German: Kamissow) is a village in the administrative district of Gmina Białogard, within Białogard County, West Pomeranian Voivodeship, in north-western Poland. It lies approximately 6 km (4 mi) west of Białogard and 108 km (67 mi) north-east of the regional capital Szczecin.

For the history of the region, see History of Pomerania.

== Notable residents ==
- Moritz Franz Kasimir von Wobersnow (1708–1759), Prussian general
