= Białogórzyno =

- Village
- Location within Poland
- Coordinates: 54°4′20″N 16°5′23″E
- Country: Poland
- Voivodeship: West Pomeranian
- County: Białogard
- Gmina: Białogard

Białogórzyno [bjawɔɡuˈʐɨnɔ] (German: Bulgrin) is a village in the administrative district of Gmina Białogard, within Białogard County, West Pomeranian Voivodeship, in north-western Poland. It lies approximately 11 km (7 mi) north-east of Białogard and 123 km (76 mi) north-east of the regional capital Szczecin. As of the census of 2011, the village has population of 400.

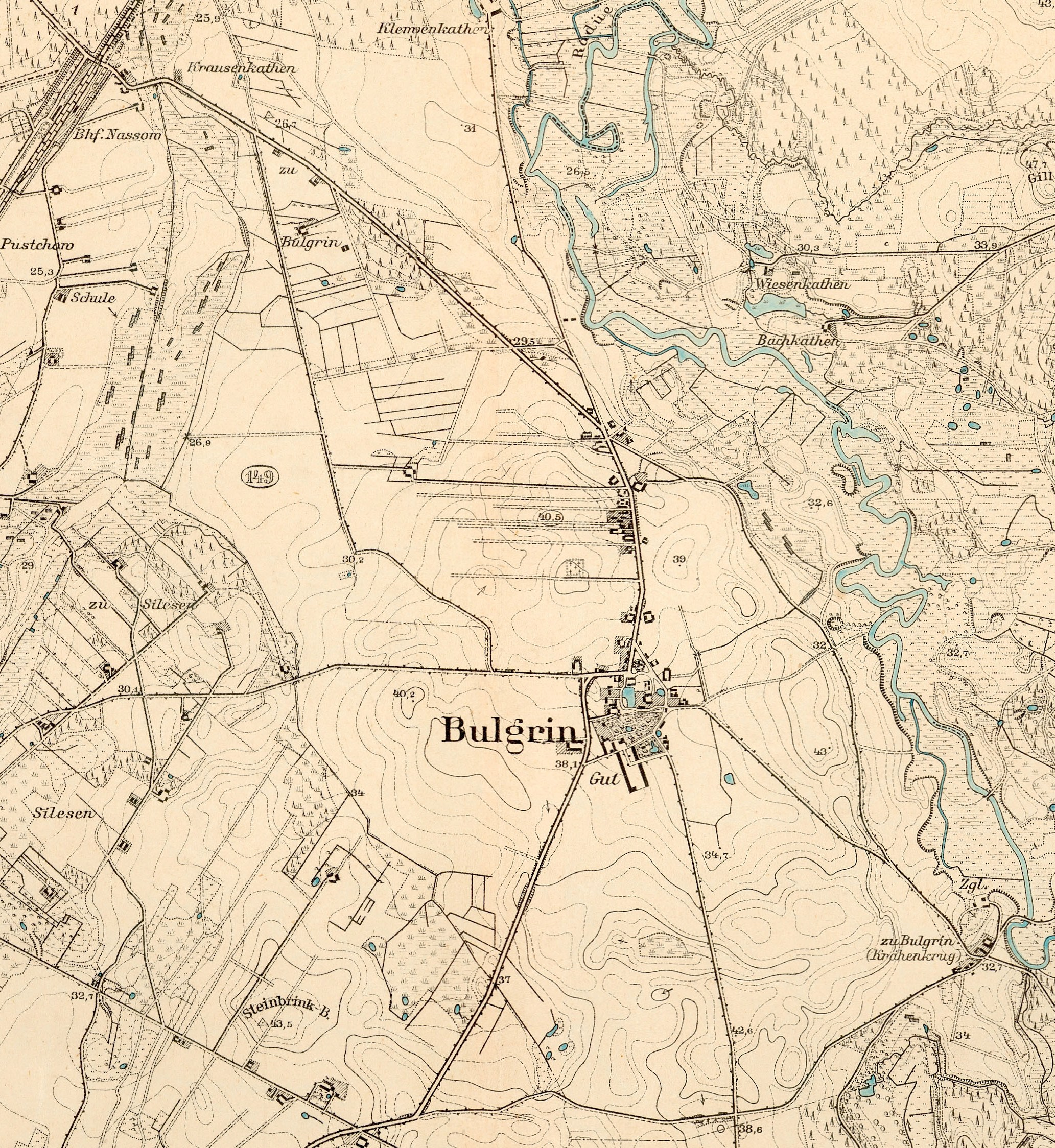
Map of Bulgrin (Białogórzyno) in 1891

== See also ==
History of Pomerania
