= Pustkowo, Białogard County =

Pustkowo
- Village
- Location within Poland
- Coordinates: 54°4′0″N 16°2′0″E
- Country: Poland
- Voivodeship: West Pomeranian
- County: Białogard
- Gmina: Białogard

Pustkowo [pustˈkɔvɔ] (German: Pustchow) is a village in the administrative district of Gmina Białogard, within Białogard County, West Pomeranian Voivodeship, in north-western Poland. It lies approximately 7 km (4 mi) north of Białogard and 120 km (75 mi) north-east of the regional capital Szczecin.

For the history of the region, see History of Pomerania.
