= Redlino =

- Village
- Location within Poland
- Coordinates: 54°1′34″N 15°54′2″E
- Country: Poland
- Voivodeship: West Pomeranian
- County: Białogard
- Gmina: Białogard

Redlino [rɛˈdlinɔ] (German: Redlin) is a village in the administrative district of Gmina Białogard, within Białogard County, West Pomeranian Voivodeship, in north-western Poland. It lies approximately 7 km (4 mi) north-west of Białogard and 110 km (68 mi) north-east of the regional capital Szczecin.

For the history of the region, see History of Pomerania.
