= Łęczno, West Pomeranian Voivodeship =

Łęczno
- Village
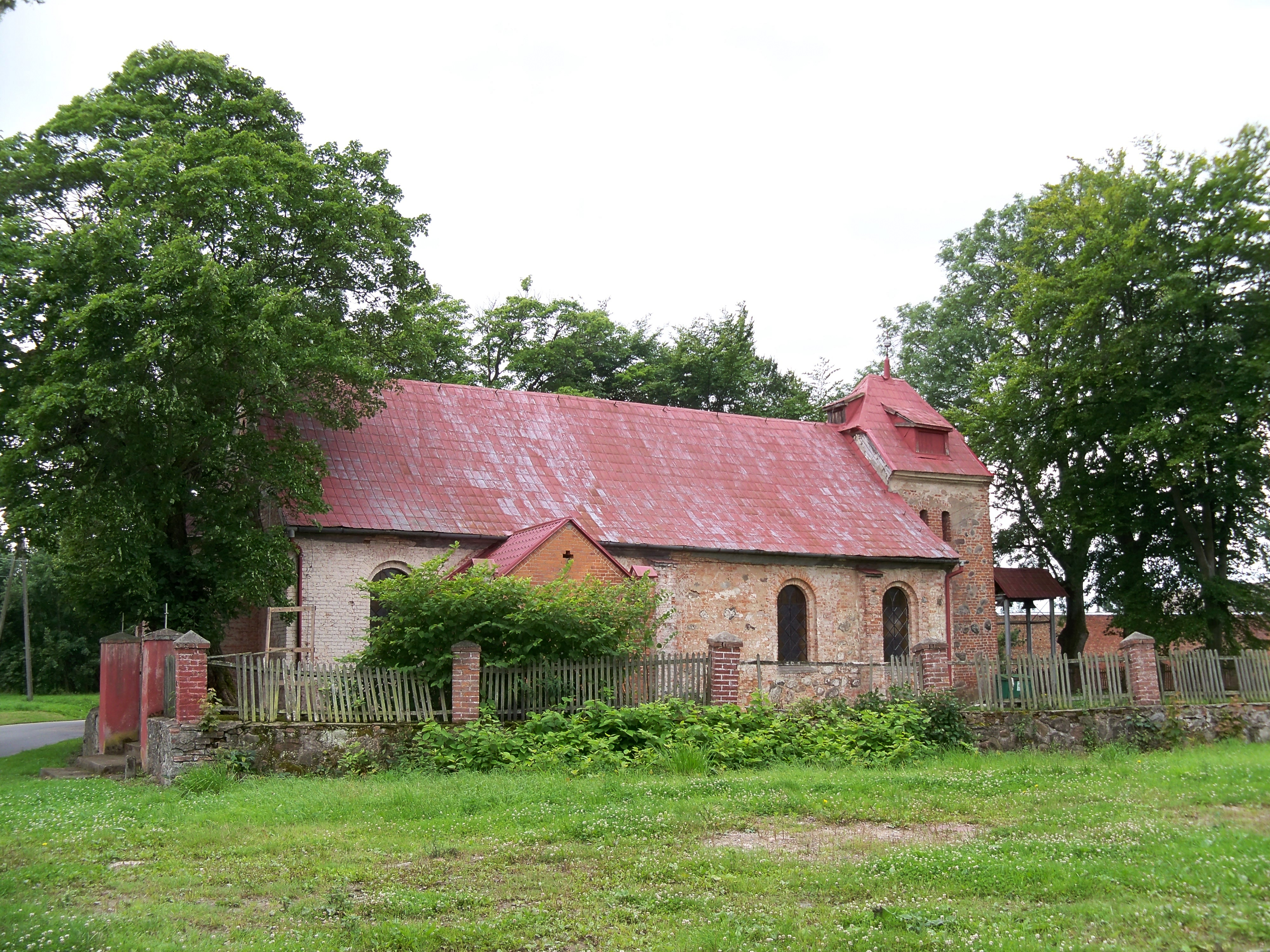
- Former Lutheran, currently Catholic Church of Virgin Mary, Queen of Poland

- Location within Poland
- Coordinates: 53°58′8″N 15°57′4″E
- Country: Poland
- Voivodeship: West Pomeranian
- County: Białogard
- Gmina: Białogard

Łęczno [ˈwɛnt͡ʂnɔ] (German: Lenzen) is a village in the administrative district of Gmina Białogard, within Białogard County, West Pomeranian Voivodeship, in north-western Poland. It lies approximately 5 km (3 mi) south-west of Białogard and 110 km (68 mi) north-east of the regional capital Szczecin.

For the history of the region, see History of Pomerania.
