= Buczek, Białogard County =

Buczek
- Village
- Location within Poland
- Coordinates: 54°2′18″N 16°6′23″E
- Country: Poland
- Voivodeship: West Pomeranian
- County: Białogard
- Gmina: Białogard

Buczek [ˈbut͡ʂɛk] (German: Butzke) is a village in the administrative district of Gmina Białogard, within Białogard County, West Pomeranian Voivodeship, in north-western Poland. It lies approximately 10 km (6 mi) north-east of Białogard and 122 km (76 mi) north-east of the regional capital Szczecin.

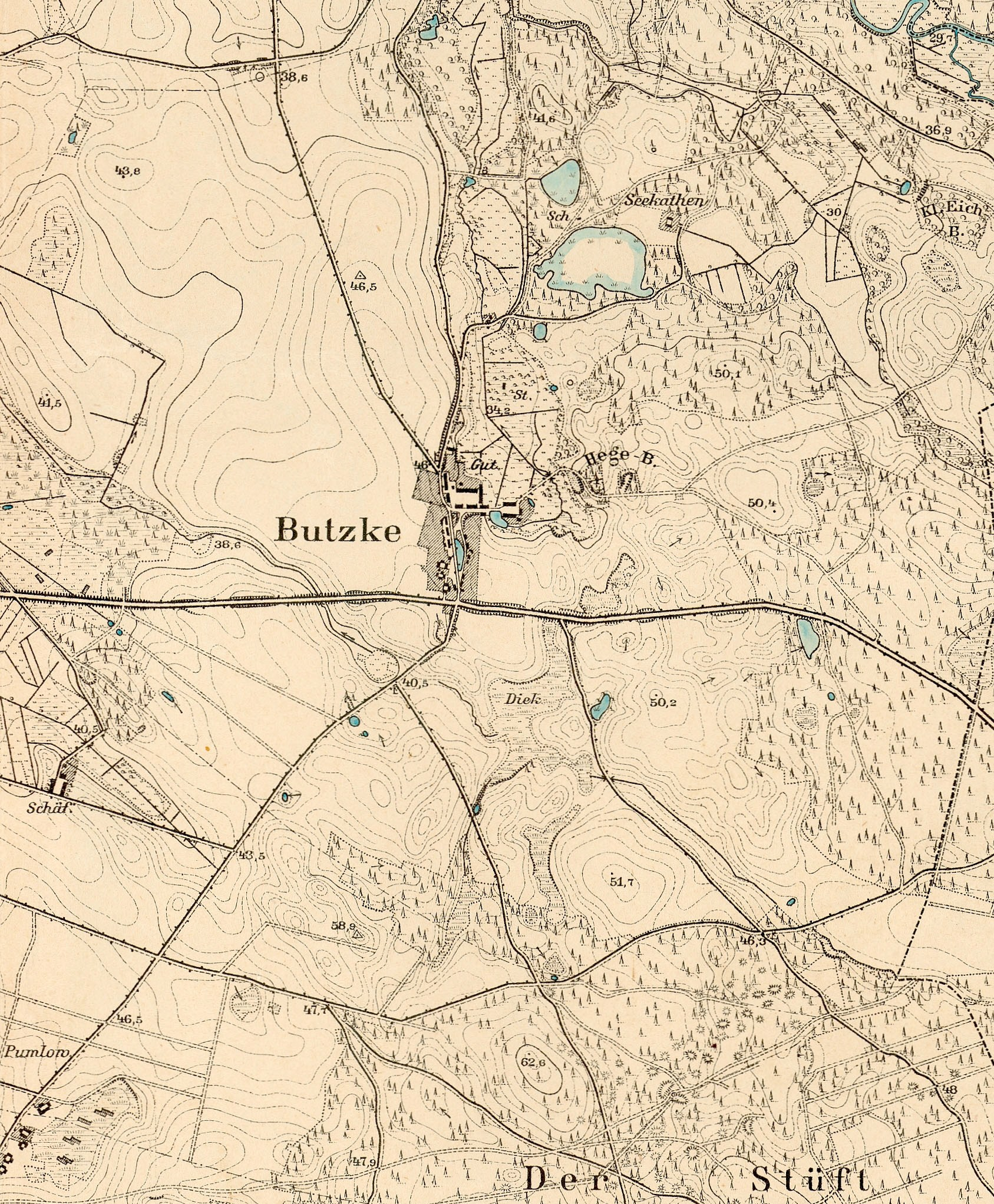
Butzke in 1891
