= Nawino =

- Village
- Location within Poland
- Coordinates: 53°55′14″N 15°58′53″E
- Country: Poland
- Voivodeship: West Pomeranian
- County: Białogard
- Gmina: Białogard

Nawino [naˈvinɔ] (German Naffin) is a village in the administrative district of Gmina Białogard, within Białogard County, West Pomeranian Voivodeship, in north-western Poland. It lies approximately 9 km (6 mi) south of Białogard and 108 km (67 mi) north-east of the regional capital Szczecin.

For the history of the region, see History of Pomerania.
