= Lulewiczki =

- Village
- Location within Poland
- Coordinates: 54°2′56″N 15°57′59″E
- Country: Poland
- Voivodeship: West Pomeranian
- County: Białogard
- Gmina: Białogard

Lulewiczki [lulɛˈvit͡ʂki] (German: Neu Lülfitz) is a village in the administrative district of Gmina Białogard, within Białogard County, West Pomeranian Voivodeship, in north-western Poland. It lies approximately 6 km (4 mi) north of Białogard and 115 km (71 mi) north-east of the regional capital Szczecin.

For the history of the region, see History of Pomerania.
