= Zagórze, Białogard County =

Zagórze
- Village
- Location within Poland
- Coordinates: 53°58′7″N 15°50′28″E
- Country: Poland
- Voivodeship: West Pomeranian
- County: Białogard
- Gmina: Białogard
- Time zone: UTC+1 (CET)
  - Summer (DST): UTC+2 (CEST)
- Vehicle registration: ZBI

Zagórze [zaˈɡuʐɛ] (German: Sager) is a village in the administrative district of Gmina Białogard, within Białogard County, West Pomeranian Voivodeship, in north-western Poland. It lies approximately 10 km (6 mi) west of Białogard and 104 km (65 mi) north-east of the regional capital Szczecin.
