= Lulewice =

- Village
- Location within Poland
- Coordinates: 54°2′48″N 15°57′0″E
- Country: Poland
- Voivodeship: West Pomeranian
- County: Białogard
- Gmina: Białogard

Lulewice [lulɛˈvit͡sɛ] (German: Alt Lülfitz) is a village in the administrative district of Gmina Białogard, within Białogard County, West Pomeranian Voivodeship, in north-western Poland. It lies approximately 6 km (4 mi) north-west of Białogard and 114 km (71 mi) north-east of the regional capital Szczecin.

For the history of the region, see History of Pomerania.
