= Zaspy Małe =

- Village
- Location within Poland
- Coordinates: 54°1′59″N 16°9′28″E
- Country: Poland
- Voivodeship: West Pomeranian
- County: Białogard
- Gmina: Białogard

Zaspy Małe [ˈzaspɨ ˈmawɛ] (German: Klein Satspe) is a village in the administrative district of Gmina Białogard, within Białogard County, West Pomeranian Voivodeship, in north-western Poland. It lies approximately 12 km (7 mi) east of Białogard and 125 km (78 mi) north-east of the regional capital Szczecin.

For the history of the region, see History of Pomerania.
