= Sińce =

- Settlement
- Location within Poland
- Coordinates: 53°56′37″N 15°54′2″E
- Country: Poland
- Voivodeship: West Pomeranian
- County: Białogard
- Gmina: Białogard

Sińce [ˈɕiɲt͡sɛ] (German: Schinz) is a settlement in the administrative district of Gmina Białogard, within Białogard County, West Pomeranian Voivodeship, in north-western Poland. It lies approximately 9 km (6 mi) south-west of Białogard, and 105 km (65 mi) north-east of the regional capital Szczecin.

For the history of the region, see History of Pomerania.
