= Mariusz Niewiadomski =

Polish footballer

Personal information
- Date of birth: 26 April 1959 (age 67)
- Place of birth: Nosówko, Poland
- Height: 1.83 m (6 ft 0 in)
- Position: Defender

Senior career*
Years	Team	Apps	(Gls)
1977–1979	Gwardia Koszalin		
1979–1981	Stilon Gorzów Wielkopolski		
1981–1988	Lech Poznań	176	(27)
1988–1989	Polonia Adelaide		
1989	Polonia Kępno		
1990	Pogoń Szczecin		
1990	Vasalunds IF		
1990–1991	Hapoel Tel Aviv		
1992–1993	Sokół Pniewy		
1993–1994	Warta Poznań	32	(2)
1994–1996	Warta Śrem		

International career
- Poland U21

Managerial career
- –1997: Warta Poznań
- Lechia Zielona Góra
- Poznań 2000
- Nordenia Dopiewo
- Aluminium Konin
- Czarni Browar Witnica
- Piast Gorzów-Karnin
- * Club domestic league appearances and goals

Mariusz Niewiadomski (born 26 April 1959) is a Polish former professional footballer who played as a defender.

== Honours ==
Lech Poznań

- Ekstraklasa: 1982–83, 1983–84
- Polish Cup: 1981–82, 1983–84, 1987–88
