= Rarwino, Białogard County =

Rarwino
- Village
- Location within Poland
- Coordinates: 53°57′11″N 15°47′41″E
- Country: Poland
- Voivodeship: West Pomeranian
- County: Białogard
- Gmina: Białogard

Rarwino [rarˈvinɔ] (German Rarfin) is a village in the administrative district of Gmina Białogard, within Białogard County, West Pomeranian Voivodeship, in north-western Poland. It lies approximately 14 km (9 mi) south-west of Białogard and 100 km (62 mi) north-east of the regional capital Szczecin.

For the history of the region, see History of Pomerania.
