= Brusno, Poland =

Brusno
- Village
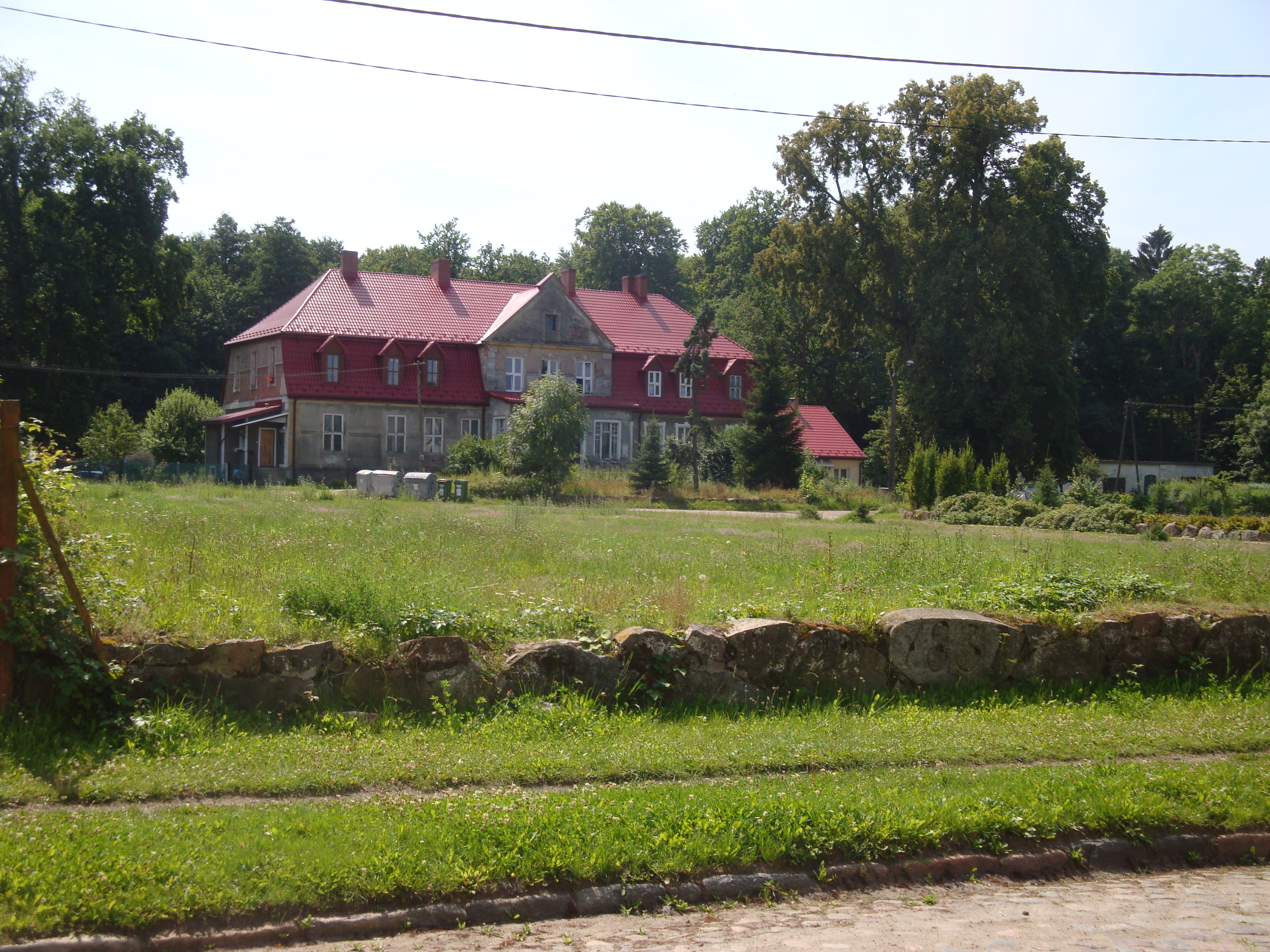

- Location within Poland
- Coordinates: 53°43′N 16°13′E
- Country: Poland
- Voivodeship: West Pomeranian
- County: Świdwin
- Gmina: Połczyn-Zdrój

Brusno [ˈbrusnɔ] (German Brutzen) is a village in the administrative district of Gmina Połczyn-Zdrój, within Świdwin County, West Pomeranian Voivodeship, in north-western Poland. It lies approximately 10 km (6 mi) south-east of Połczyn-Zdrój, 31 km (19 mi) east of Świdwin, and 113 km (70 mi) east of the regional capital Szczecin.

== See also ==
- History of Pomerania
