= Ogartowo =

- Village
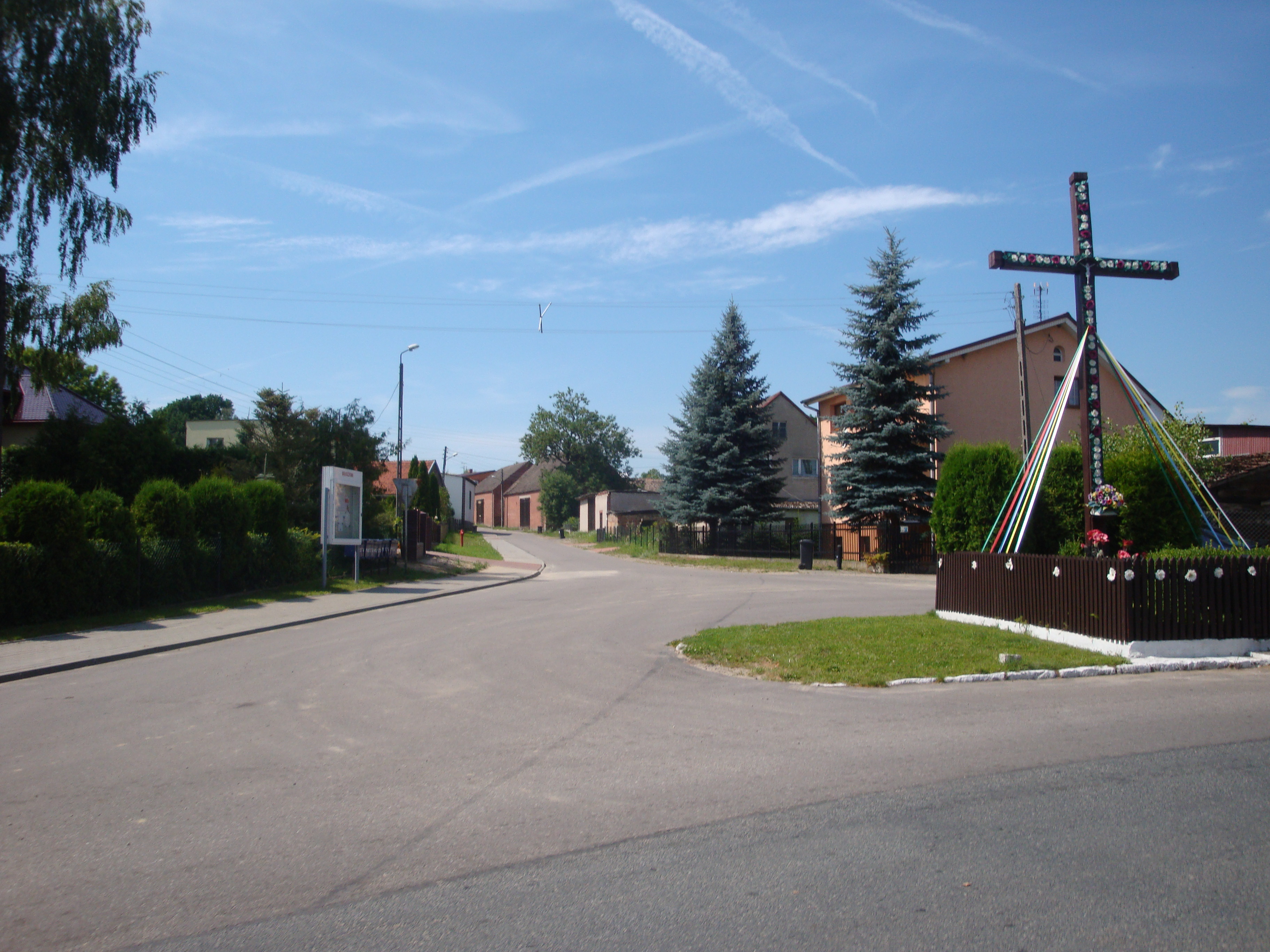

- Location within Poland
- Coordinates: 53°46′N 16°8′E
- Country: Poland
- Voivodeship: West Pomeranian
- County: Świdwin
- Gmina: Połczyn-Zdrój

Ogartowo [ɔɡarˈtɔvɔ] (German Jagertow) is a village in the administrative district of Gmina Połczyn-Zdrój, within Świdwin County, West Pomeranian Voivodeship, in north-western Poland. It lies approximately 3 km (2 mi) east of Połczyn-Zdrój, 25 km (16 mi) east of Świdwin, and 110 km (68 mi) east of the regional capital Szczecin.

== See also ==
- History of Pomerania
