= Rzyszczewo, Białogard County =

Rzyszczewo
- Village
- Location within Poland
- Coordinates: 53°55′38″N 16°3′4″E
- Country: Poland
- Voivodeship: West Pomeranian
- County: Białogard
- Gmina: Białogard

Rzyszczewo [ʐɨʂˈt͡ʂɛvɔ] (German Ristow) is a village in the administrative district of Gmina Białogard, within Białogard County, West Pomeranian Voivodeship, in north-western Poland. It lies approximately 10 km (6 mi) south-east of Białogard and 113 km (70 mi) north-east of the regional capital Szczecin.

== See also ==
- History of Pomerania
