= Coat of arms of Białogard =

- Armiger: Białogard
- Adopted: 1387 (first known appearance); 3 March 2004 (current version)
- Shield: White Iberian style escutcheon
- Compartment: Red griffin standing on its back legs, above the blue horizontal wavy line

The coat of arms of the town of Białogard, Poland, depicts a red griffin standing on its back legs, above the blue horizontal wavy line. The current coat of arms was established in 2004.

== Design ==
The coat of arms of Białogard consists of the white Iberian style escutcheon (shield) with square top and rounded base. Within it is placed a red griffin standing on its back legs, and facing towards the viewer's left. It stands on a blue horizontal wavy line.

The red griffin is a symbol of the region of West Pomerania. The blue line represents the Parsęta river, which the town of Białogard is located at.

== History ==
The griffin is a traditional symbol of the West Pomerania, used since 12th century. Between 12th and 13th century, the griffin become the symbol of the House of Griffin, that ruled in that area. Subsequently, the red griffin on the white background had become the symbol of the Duchy of the Pomerania-Stettin. In the 1730s, that design had become the symbol of the entire West Pomerania.

The oldest known seal of the town comes from 1387. It depicts a griffin standing above the river, facing right. Within the outer circle of the seal is written "SECRETUM CIVITAS BELGART", which in Latin translates to the secret seal of the town of Belgard [Białogard].

While under Prussian administration, the coat of arms of the town depicted a red griffin, standing on a blue horizontal wavy line, placed within a white Iberian style escutcheon (shield). It remained in use until 1945, when the town was incorporated into Poland in the aftermath of World War II.

The current coat of arms of town was established on 3 March 2004, by the Białogard City Council.
