= Ewald von Kleist-Schmenzin =

German politician and resistance member (1890–1945)

- Born: 22 March 1890; Dubberow, Province of Pomerania, Kingdom of Prussia, German Empire
- Died: 9 April 1945 (aged 55); Plötzensee Prison, Berlin, Nazi Germany
- Cause of death: Execution by hanging
- Children: Ewald-Heinrich von Kleist-Schmenzin

Ewald Albert Friedrich Karl Leopold Arnold von Kleist-Schmenzin (22 March 1890 – 9 April 1945) was a German anti-Nazi resistance fighter, lawyer, conservative and monarchist politician, opponent of Nazism, and a member of the 20 July Plot to assassinate Adolf Hitler, for which he was put to death by hanging.

== Biography ==
Ewald von Kleist-Schmenzin was the son of the Royal Prussian Rittmeister Hermann von Kleist (1849–1913), part of the Kleist family, and his wife, Elisabeth (1863–1945). Born in Dubberow, Province of Pomerania, German Empire (now Dobrowo, Poland), he supported the national-conservative German National People's Party (Deutschnationale Volkspartei). As a conservative, he supported the idea of monarchy and Christian ideals, shown in part through his membership of the Order of Saint John (Bailiwick of Brandenburg), to which he was admitted as a Knight of Honour in 1922 and in which he was promoted to Knight of Justice in 1935. He was a staunch, active opponent of Nazism even before Hitler came to power in 1933. He was arrested as a result in May and June of that year, although he was never held for very long. He refused to fly the Nazi flag over his castle.

Ewald von Kleist-Schmenzin went to the United Kingdom in 1938 as Admiral Wilhelm Canaris's and Colonel-General Ludwig Beck's secret emissary. He was to make the British government aware of the resistance to Hitler's rule inside Germany. He used his contacts with Winston Churchill and Robert Vansittart to try to shift British policy away from one of appeasement to one based more on the use of force. He believed that only if the British were seen to be willing to use force to support Czechoslovakia would the opposition in Germany have the support that it needed among Germany's High Command to move against Hitler. Churchill agreed that a change of leadership in Germany would be a good idea, and even sent Hitler a strongly worded letter, but since Churchill was not yet Prime Minister, it had no effect on him. Kleist-Schmenzin's efforts to get the British to change their policy failed, as did a number of other later missions sent by those who opposed the Nazis. Another factor in his diplomatic failure was that the nationalist resistance against Hitler openly revealed to British politicians that it sought to annex territory in both Poland and Czechoslovakia. During his mission in Britain, he presented such bold German revisionist demands for annexation of other countries' areas, that in the words of Klemens von Klemperer, "territorial aspirations of the Widerstand exceed those of even the Nazis". At the same time Kleist claimed that besides Hitler there were no other extremist elements in Germany.

== 20 July Plot ==
Kleist-Schmenzin still supported the idea of overthrowing Hitler. To that end, he met Carl Friedrich Goerdeler in 1942 and 1943, a fellow conservative and resistance fighter, who also favoured a coup d'état. Kleist-Schmenzin eventually found his way into the plot's inner circle and advocated a number of violent acts to get rid of Hitler. He urged his son, Lieutenant Ewald-Heinrich von Kleist-Schmenzin, to go through with a suicide-assassination plot in January 1944 which would have seen him blow himself and Hitler up with two hand grenades hidden under a new uniform that he was to "demonstrate" to Hitler (or explosives hidden in his briefcase were to be used). However, Hitler did not show up. Kleist-Schmenzin also supported Claus von Stauffenberg's plan to kill Hitler with a briefcase bomb that the Count would take to the Wolf's Lair in East Prussia. Stauffenberg appointed Kleist-Schmenzin political representative in the Stettin military district in preparation for the coup d'état.

== Arrest, trial, and execution ==
Stauffenberg's briefcase bomb failed to kill Hitler on 20 July 1944; and Kleist-Schmenzin was arrested the next day. He was brought before the infamous Nazi Volksgerichtshof ("People's Court") on 23 February 1945, where he was sentenced to death for his part in the plot. He was executed at Plötzensee Prison in Berlin on 9 April 1945 – three weeks before the death of Hitler and the fall of the Nazi regime.
