= Szeligowo =

- Village
- Location within Poland
- Coordinates: 53°45′N 15°58′E
- Country: Poland
- Voivodeship: West Pomeranian
- County: Świdwin
- Gmina: Połczyn-Zdrój

Szeligowo [ʂɛliˈɡɔvɔ] (German Seeligsfelde) is a village in the administrative district of Gmina Połczyn-Zdrój, within Świdwin County, West Pomeranian Voivodeship, in north-western Poland. It lies approximately 9 km (6 mi) west of Połczyn-Zdrój, 14 km (9 mi) east of Świdwin, and 99 km (62 mi) east of the regional capital Szczecin.

== See also ==
- History of Pomerania
