= Amtsbezirk =

German language designation for a country subdivision

Amtsbezirk is a German-language designation for a country subdivision. It was used in Prussia from 1874 until 1945 and in the canton of Bern before 1 January 2010.
