= Rzyszczewo, Sławno County =

Rzyszczewo
- Village
- Location within Poland
- Coordinates: 54°20′23″N 16°35′59″E
- Country: Poland
- Voivodeship: West Pomeranian
- County: Sławno
- Gmina: Gmina Sławno
- Population: 420

Rzyszczewo [ʐɨʂˈt͡ʂɛvɔ] (German Ristow) is a village in the administrative district of Gmina Sławno, within Sławno County, West Pomeranian Voivodeship, in north-western Poland. It lies approximately 7 km (4 mi) south-west of Sławno and 168 km (104 mi) north-east of the regional capital Szczecin.

For the history of the region, see History of Pomerania.

The village has a population of 420.
