= Białogard =

Town in West Pomeranian Voivodeship, Poland

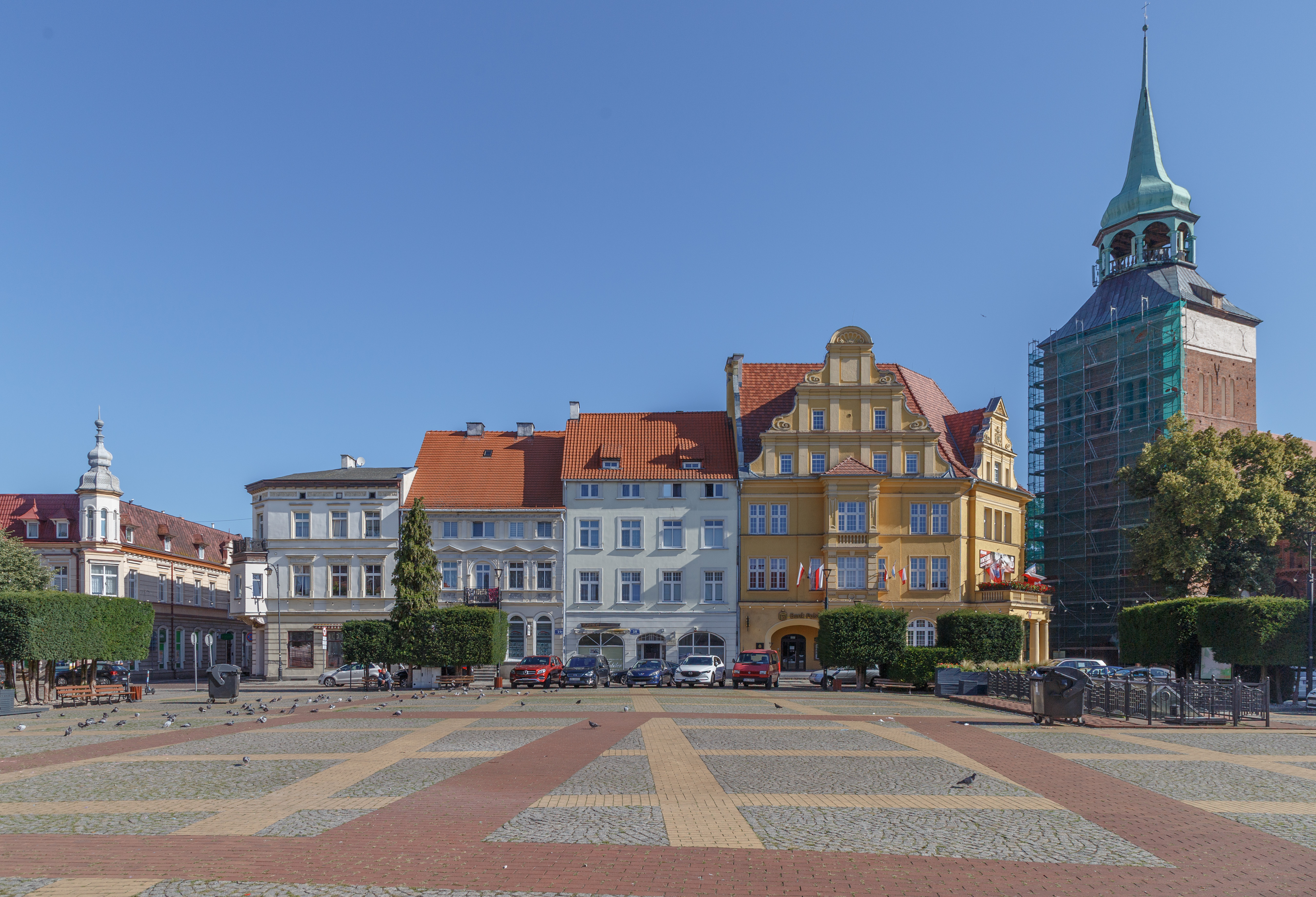
- Church of the Nativity of the Virgin Mary and the town square

- Flag Coat of arms

- Location within Poland
- Coordinates: 54°0′N 15°59′E
- Country: Poland
- Voivodeship: West Pomeranian
- County: Białogard
- Gmina: Białogard (urban gmina)
- First mentioned: 12th century
- Town rights: 1299

Government
  - Mayor: Emilia Bury

Area
  - Total: 25.73 km^{2} (9.93 sq mi)

Population (31 December 2021)
  - Total: 23,614
  - Density: 918/km^{2} (2,380/sq mi)
- Time zone: UTC+1 (CET)
  - Summer (DST): UTC+2 (CEST)
- Postal code: 78-200
- Area code: +48 94
- Car plates: ZBI
- Website: www.bialogard.info

Białogard (pronounced [bjaˈwɔɡart]; German: Belgard [ˈbɛlɡaʁt]; Pomeranian: Biôłogard) is a historic town in Middle Pomerania, northwestern Poland, with 23,614 inhabitants as of December 2021. The capital of Białogard County in the West Pomeranian Voivodeship.

Bialogard is one of the oldest towns in Pomerania, which developed from an early medieval fortified stronghold. It prospered as a center of trade and crafts. Today it is a small industrial centre and a site for natural gas extraction. It is the most important railroad junction of Middle Pomerania, which links Kołobrzeg with Piła and Gdańsk with Stargard. It has a number of heritage sites from different periods, including several medieval town gates and churches.

== History ==
=== Medieval period ===
According to archaeologists the Białogard stronghold was built in the fork of the Parsęta and Leśnica Rivers as early as the 8th century. In the 10th century it was an important centre of long-range international trade at the crossroads of two important trade routes: a north–south "salt route" from Kołobrzeg to Poznań and Greater Poland, and the west-east Pomeranian route from Szczecin to Gdańsk.

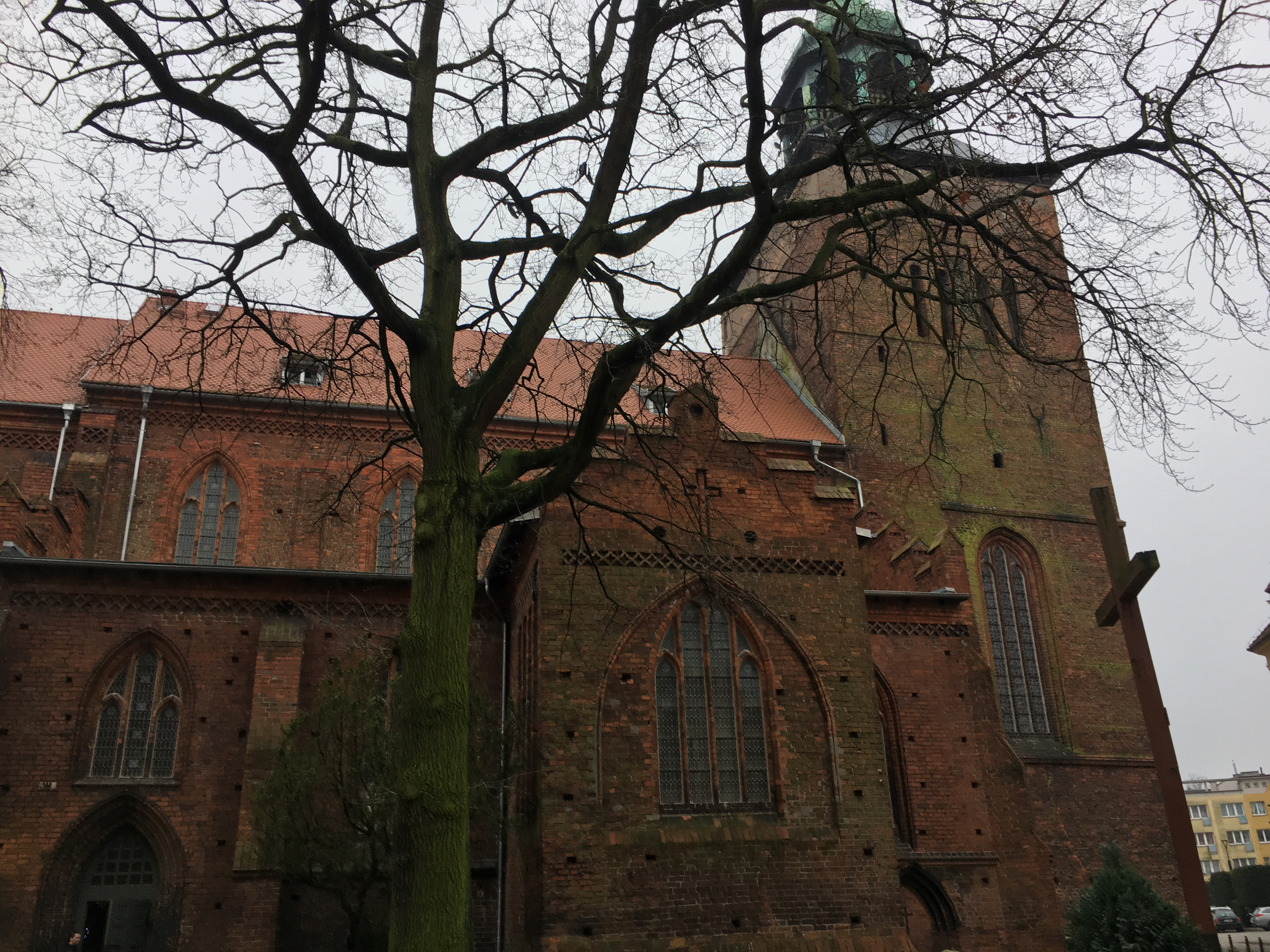
Medieval Gothic Church of the Nativity of the Virgin Mary

Pomerania was inhabited by several tribes collectively known as Pomeranians, and Białogard was probably the centre of one of them. The territory became part of the emerging Polish state under its first ruler Mieszko I around 967. His son, Duke Bolesław the Brave established a bishopric in nearby Kołobrzeg in 1000, and introduced Christianity.

Białogard is first mentioned in the chronicle of Gallus Anonymous as a rich and populous stronghold in the middle of Pomerania, a famous royal city called white (Alba Regia). This city was conquered by Boleslaus III of Poland in 1107. By the invitation of Bolesław III the Wrymouth and his vassal Wartisław I of Pomerania, Bishop Otto of Bamberg came with a mission to Pomerania in 1124; Białogard was one of the places he visited. In the 12th century Białogard was a seat of a regional governor (castellan).

Kashubia was the name of the region around this town. The town developed quickly as one of the more important economic centres of the Duchy of Pomerania, and this was strengthened by the Lübeck law granted to the city by Duke Bogusław IV in 1299. In 1307 the city was granted staple rights. In 1386 it became a member of the Hanseatic League. In the 15th century there were disputes with the nearby town of Świdwin, and in 1469 even a battle was fought between the towns. On the 500-year anniversary of the battle, on the initiative of Polish writer and publisher Leon Zdanowicz, in post-World War II Poland, a medieval-style competition was organized between the inhabitants of both towns. As a local tradition, these competitions have been organized annually since. As a result of the feudal fragmentation of Pomerania, Białogard was part of Pomerania-Wolgast from 1295 and Pomerania-Stolp (Duchy of Słupsk), a vassal state of the Polish Crown, from 1368. Duke Wartislaw IV chose the town as his main place of residence in 1315. Pomerania was united under Duke Bogislaw X in 1478, after 1569 the town was part of the Pomerania-Stettin, and later was again in the united Duchy of Pomerania under Bogislaw XIV, the last Pomeranian duke.

=== Modern period ===
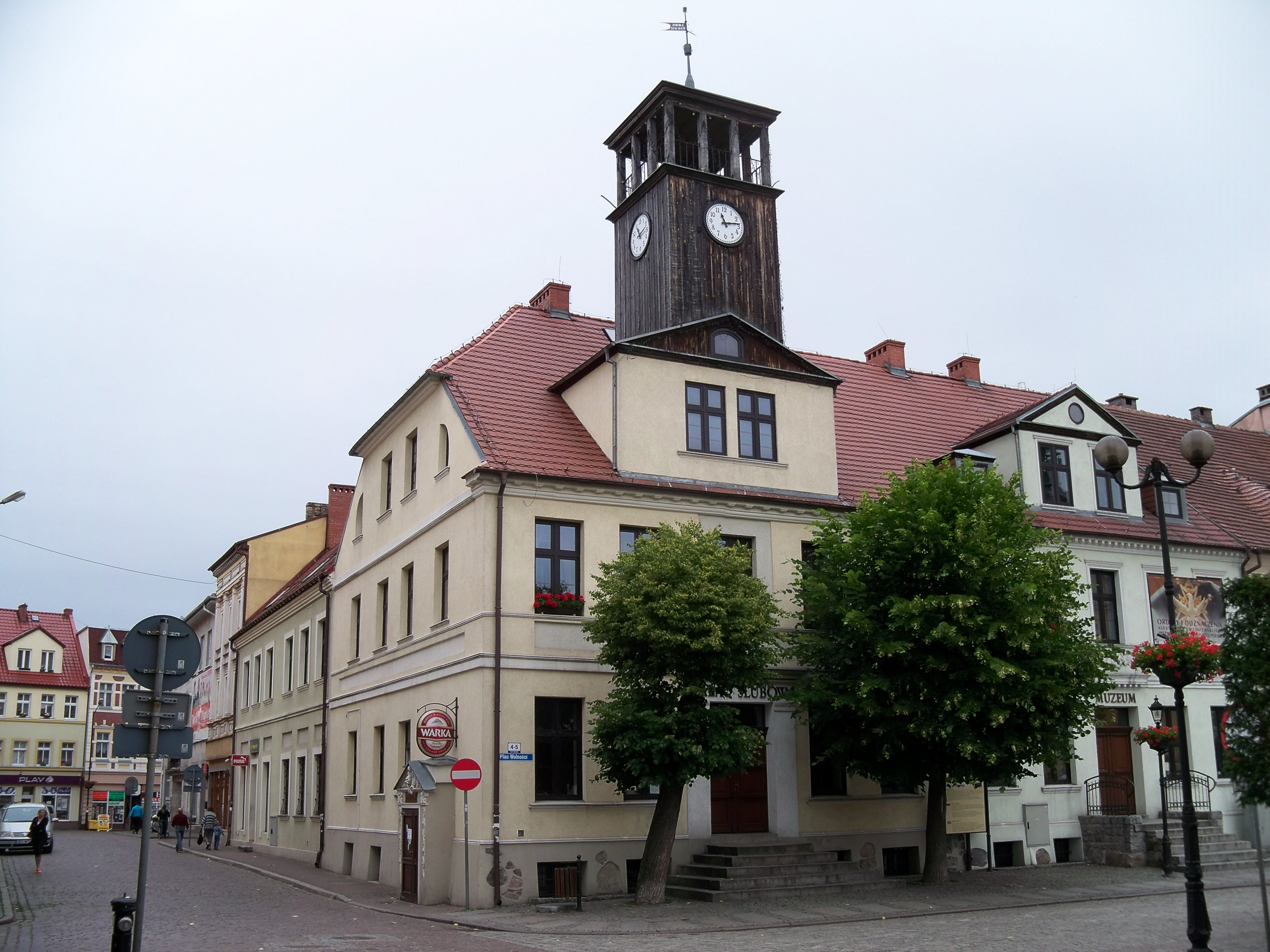
Preserved town hall dating back hundreds of years

Crafts and trade flourished. In 1534 a bakers' guild was founded, in 1580 also woodcarvers' and clothiers' guilds were established. Following the Protestant Reformation, the town became Protestant in 1534. During the Thirty Years' War the town was plundered by the troops of the Holy Roman Empire and Sweden. After the death of the last Pomeranian Duke in 1637, and as a result of the Thirty Years' War, the Duchy of Pomerania was divided between Sweden and Brandenburg-Prussia. As Belgard, with all of Farther Pomerania, the town became part of Brandenburg in 1653 and became part of the Kingdom of Prussia in 1701. In 1724 Belgard was made the capital of a county in the Province of Pomerania, and after the administrative reorganization in 1815, the capital of Landkreis Belgard (Belgard county).

The first post office in Belgard was opened in 1825. In 1858 the first railroad connecting Belgard to Köslin (Koszalin) and Schivelbein (Świdwin) was completed; it was extended to Stargard and Neustettin (Szczecinek) in 1878. Belgard became part of the German Empire in 1871.

=== 20th century ===
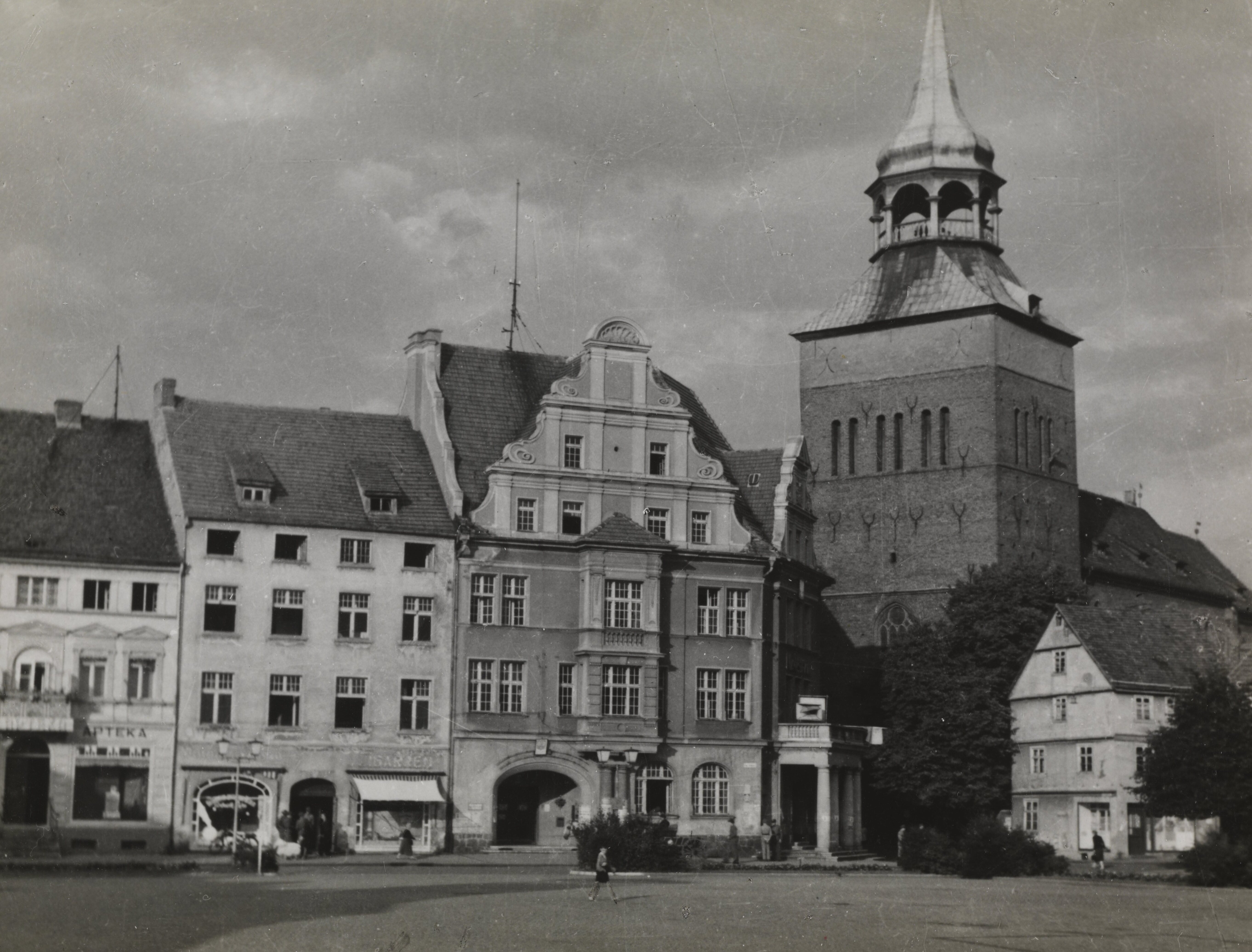
Białogard in 1945

During World War II, forced labour subcamps of the Nazi prison in Koszalin and of the Stalag II-D prisoner-of-war camp were operated by the Germans in the town. In February 1945, German-perpetrated death marches of Allied prisoners of war from the Stalag Luft IV and Stalag XX-B prisoner-of-war camps passed through the town. In the final weeks of the war, the Red Army occupied the town on March 4, 1945. According to the terms of the Potsdam Conference, after the war the town became once again part of Poland.

Białogard was made a county city in the Szczecin Voivodeship, was later assigned to the Koszalin Voivodeship, and is now located in the West Pomeranian Voivodeship. Natural gas deposits were discovered in 1982 and extraction started in 1984. In 1999 the 700th anniversary of receiving town rights was celebrated with the participation of Polish President Aleksander Kwaśniewski, who was born in Białogard.

== Demographics ==
Since the medieval Christianization of the area, the majority of the population was composed of Catholics. After the Reformation, the town's inhabitants were predominantly Protestant, particularly Lutheran. Since the end of the war the majority of the town's population is composed of Catholics, though a significant Lutheran minority remains.

Historical population

Year	Pop.	±%
1740	1,447	—
1782	1,621	+12.0%
1794	1,720	+6.1%
1812	1,983	+15.3%
1816	1,972	−0.6%
1831	2,788	+41.4%
1843	3,327	+19.3%
1852	3,845	+15.6%
1861	4,776	+24.2%

Year	Pop.	±%
1875	7,081	+48.3%
1900	8,407	+18.7%
1925	12,480	+48.4%
1939	16,455	+31.9%
1940	16,500	+0.3%
1945	14,300	−13.3%
1950	12,700	−11.2%
1960	17,800	+40.2%
1970	20,600	+15.7%

Year	Pop.	±%
1975	21,800	+5.8%
1980	22,500	+3.2%
1990	24,200	+7.6%
1995	25,223	+4.2%
2000	24,586	−2.5%
2005	24,356	−0.9%
2010	24,927	+2.3%
2015	24,437	−2.0%
2020	23,950	−2.0%

== Main sights ==
Sights of Białogard (examples)

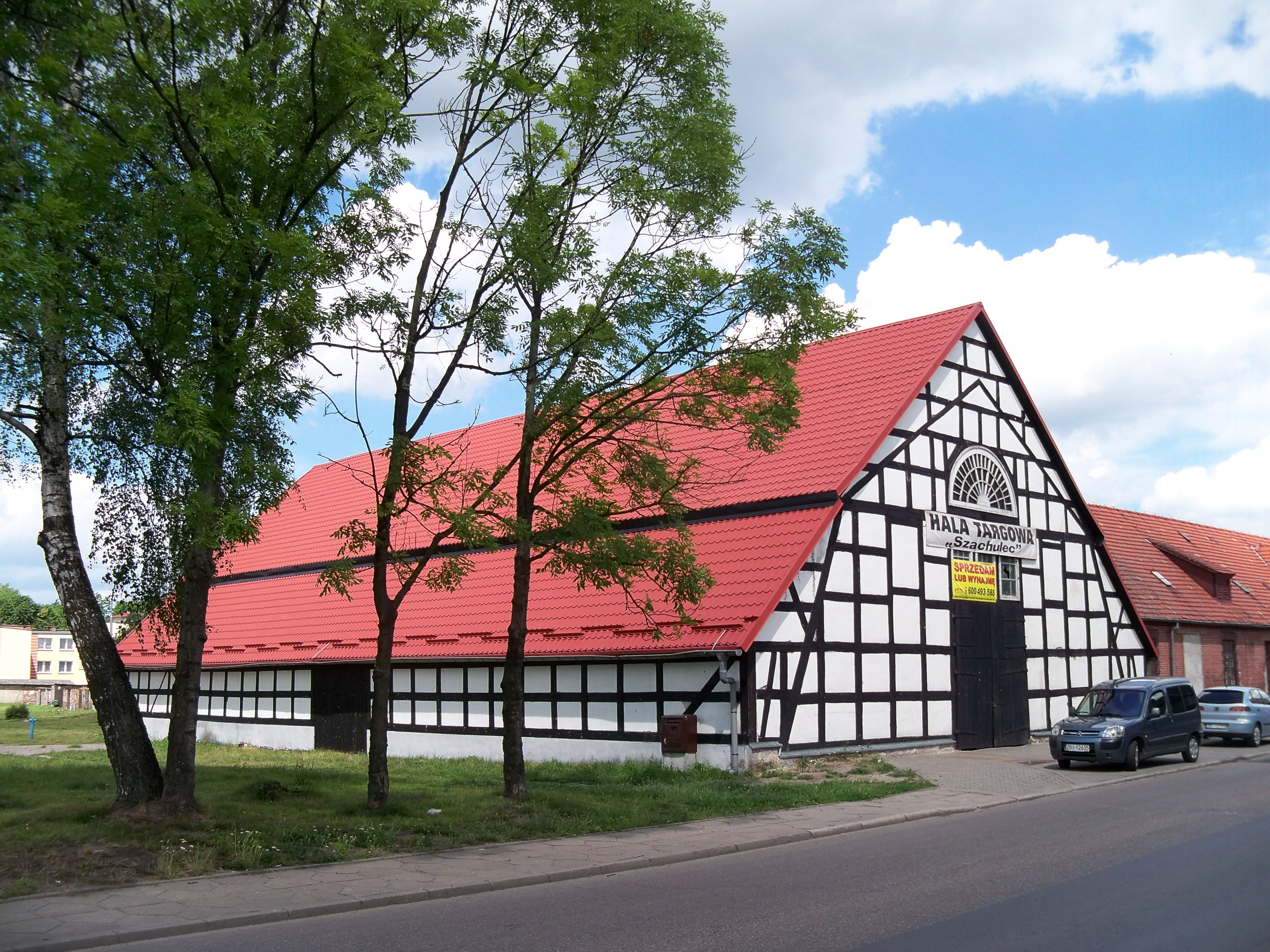
Timber-framed granary

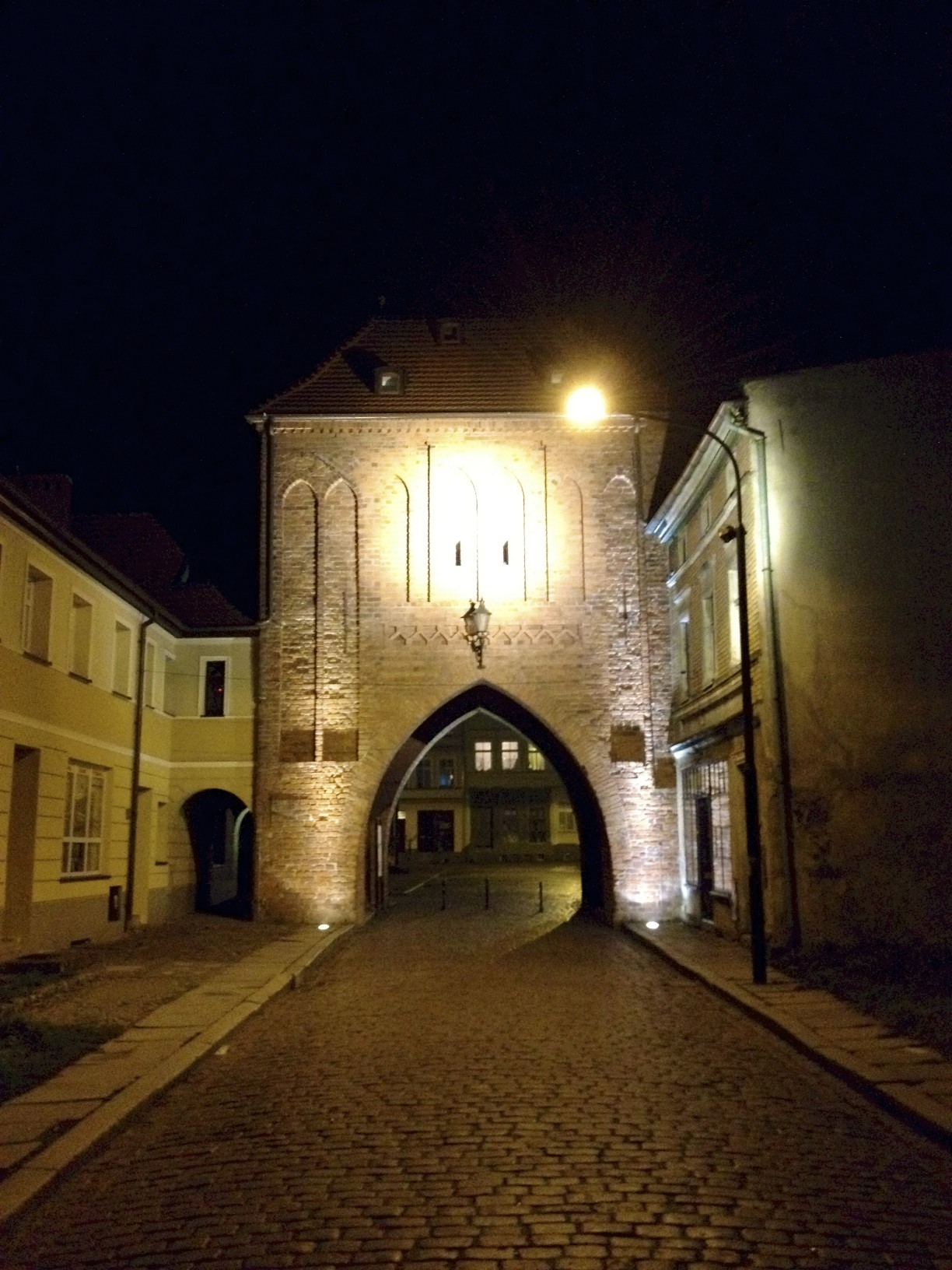
Połczyńska Gate

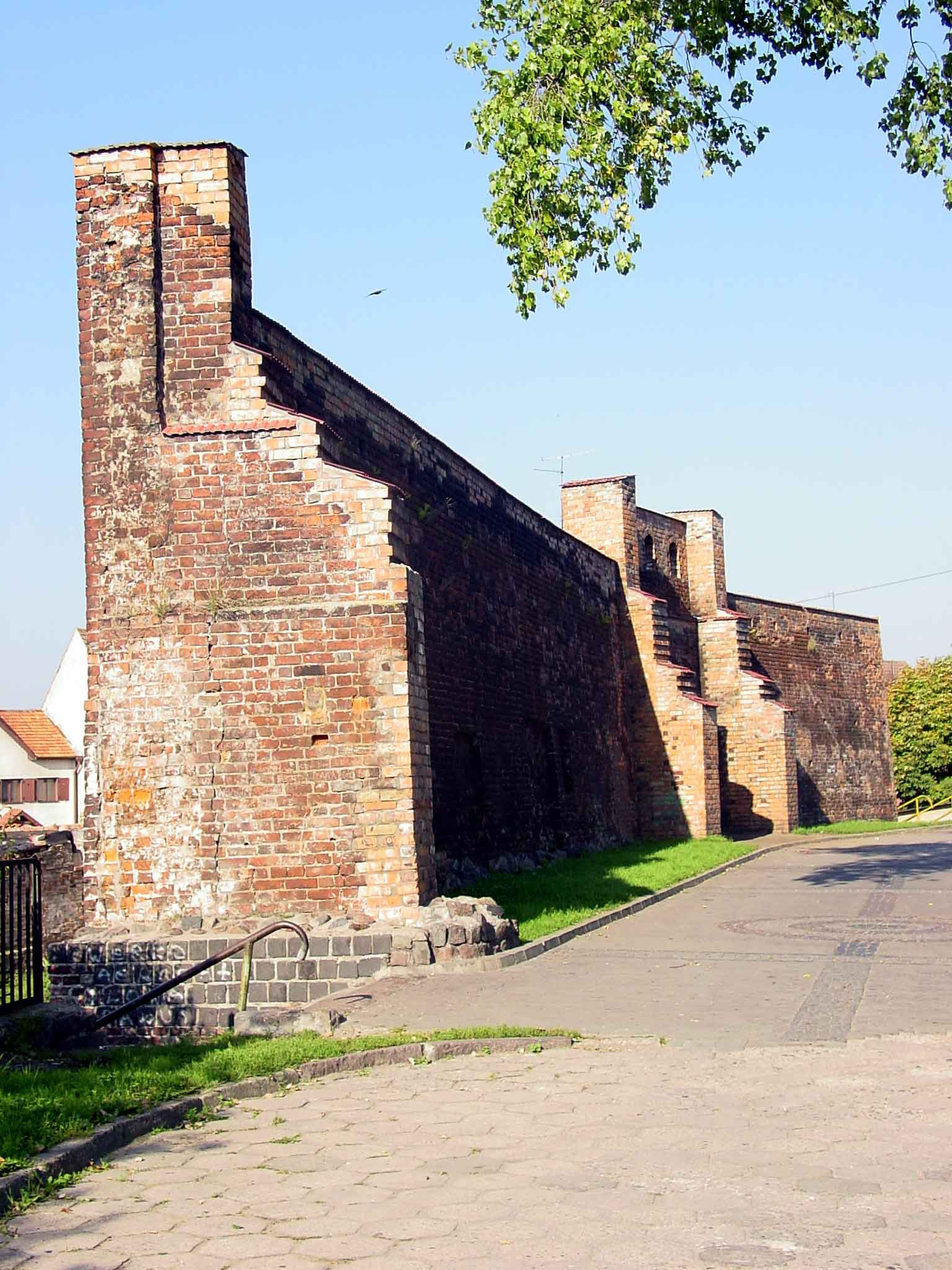
Medieval town walls

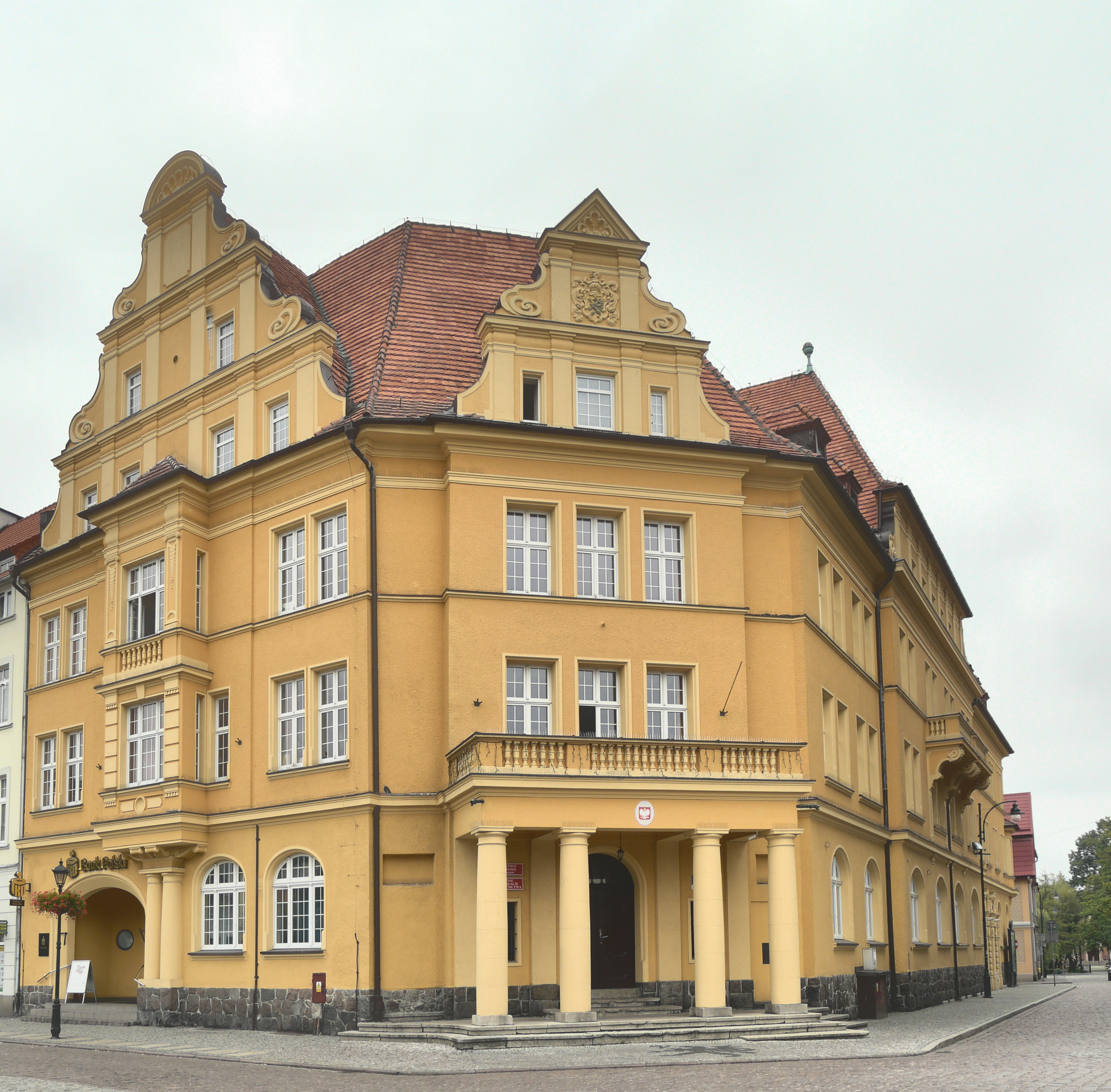
Białogard County office

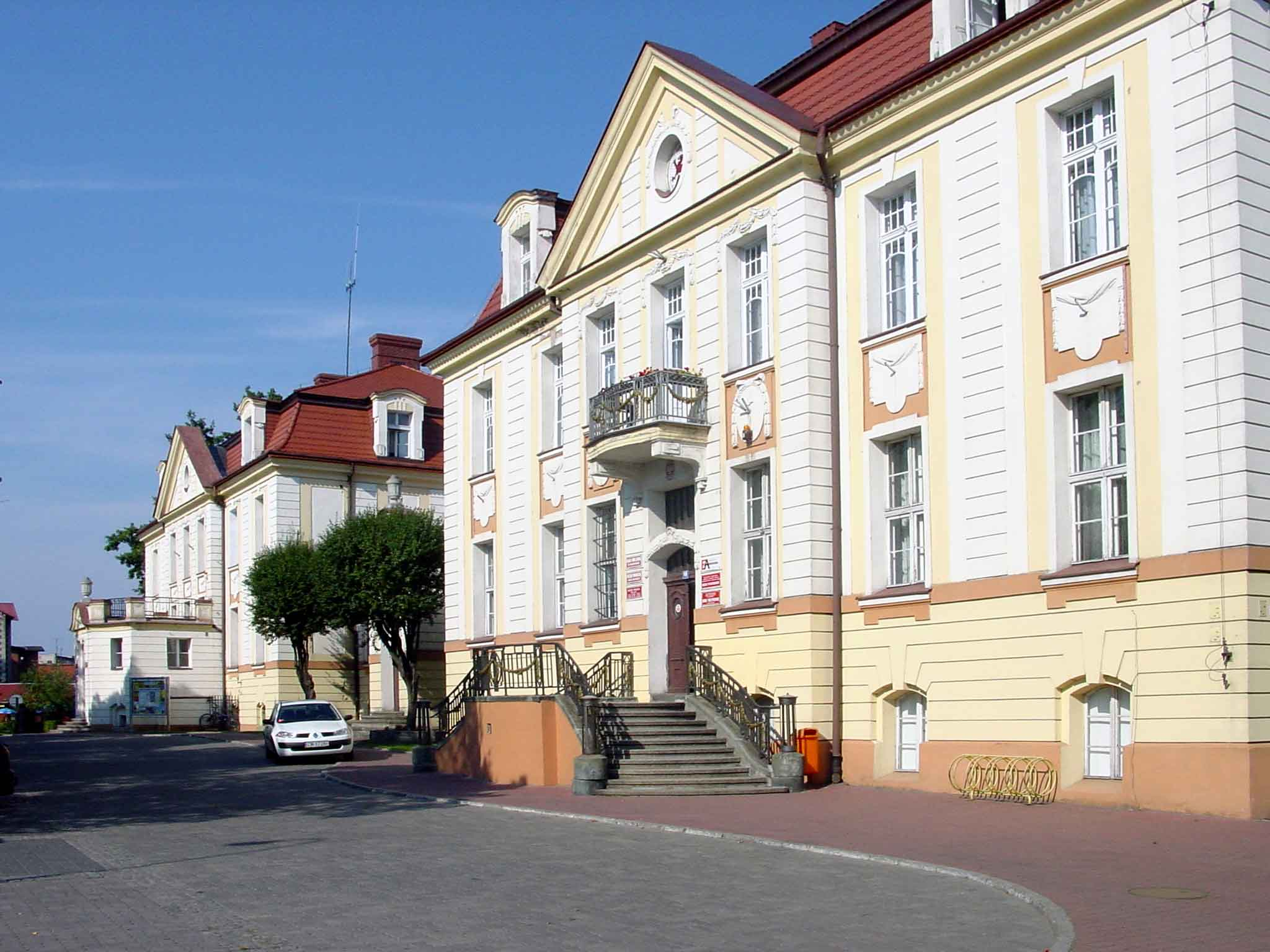
Municipal Office

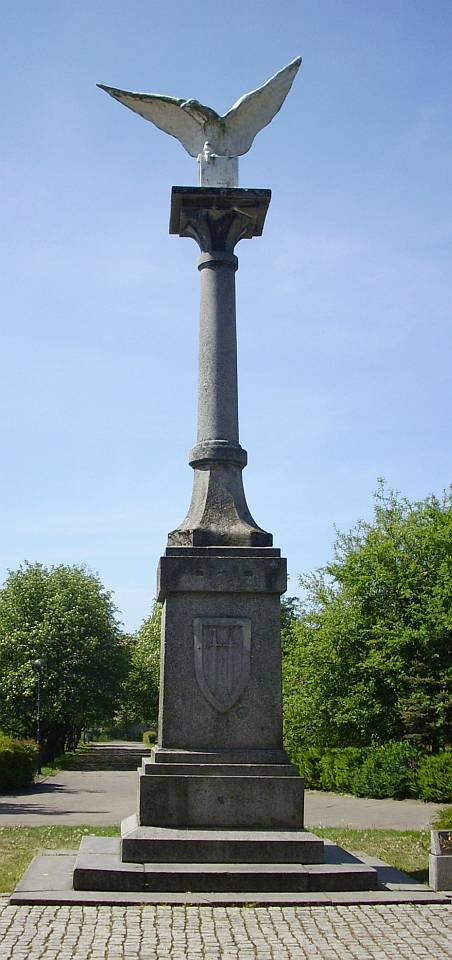
White Eagle Monument

- Old Town (Stare Miasto) with historic townhouses
- Brick Gothic Połczyńska Gate
- Gothic Church of the Nativity of the Virgin Mary
- Partly preserved medieval town walls
- Gothic St. George church
- Białogard County office
- Old town hall (Stary Ratusz), now housing a local museum and a Wedding Palace
- Municipal Office
- Former town granary made from a timber frame
- White Eagle Park with the White Eagle Monument
- Music School (Szkoła Muzyczna)
- Pedagogical Library (Biblioteka Pedagogiczna)
- A monument commemorating the victims of Soviet and communist repressions and exiles to Siberia
- Remains of the castle

== Notable residents ==
- Otto Busse (1867–1922), German pathologist
- Erika Fuchs (1906–2005), translator of Donald Duck
- Czesław Niemen (1939–2004), Polish singer-songwriters and rock balladeer
- Leonore Siegele-Wenschkewitz (1944-1999), German church historian
- Countess Anna Maria Komorowska (born 1946), Polish noblewoman and the mother of Queen Mathilde of Belgium
- Andrzej Wasilewicz (1951–2016), Polish stage and film actor and film director.
- Aleksander Kwaśniewski (born 1954), President of Poland (1995–2005)
- Dariusz Szubert (born 1970), Polish football coach and former football player.
- Dariusz Białkowski (born 1970), Polish sprint canoer who won two bronze Summer Olympics medals
- Zbigniew Baranowski (born 1991), Polish wrestler, competed at the 2016 Summer Olympics
- Wiktoria Chołuj (born 2000), Polish wrestler, competed at the 2024 Summer Olympics

== Twin towns – sister cities ==
Białogard is twinned with:

- Aknīste, Latvia
- Albano Laziale, Italy
- Binz, Germany
- Gnosjö, Sweden
- Maardu, Estonia
- Olen, Belgium
- Teterow, Germany
