= Karpno =

Karpno may refer to the following places:

- Karpno, Bytów County in Pomeranian Voivodeship (north Poland)
- Karpno, Słupsk County in Pomeranian Voivodeship (north Poland)
- Karpno, Drawsko County in West Pomeranian Voivodeship (north-west Poland)
- Karpno, Świdwin County in West Pomeranian Voivodeship (north-west Poland)
