= Batyń =

- Village
- Location within Poland
- Coordinates: 53°52′48″N 15°53′10″E
- Country: Poland
- Voivodeship: West Pomeranian
- County: Świdwin
- Gmina: Rąbino
- Population: 250

Batyń [ˈbatɨɲ] (German Battin) is a village in the administrative district of Gmina Rąbino, within Świdwin County, West Pomeranian Voivodeship, in north-western Poland. It lies approximately 5 km (3 mi) north-west of Rąbino, 14 km (9 mi) north-east of Świdwin, and 101 km (63 mi) north-east of the regional capital Szczecin.

The village has a population of 250.
