= Lipie, Świdwin County =

Lipie
- Village
- Location within Poland
- Coordinates: 53°49′57″N 15°56′24″E
- Country: Poland
- Voivodeship: West Pomeranian
- County: Świdwin
- Gmina: Rąbino
- Population: 150

Lipie [ˈlipjɛ] (German: Arnhausen) is a village in the administrative district of Gmina Rąbino, within Świdwin County, West Pomeranian Voivodeship, in north-western Poland. It lies approximately 4 km (2 mi) south of Rąbino, 13 km (8 mi) north-east of Świdwin, and 101 km (63 mi) north-east of the regional capital Szczecin.

For the history of the region, see History of Pomerania.
