= Przybysław =

Przybysław may refer to:

== Polish given name ==
Feminine form: Przybysława

- Przybysława, wife of Ratibor I, Duke of Pomerania
- Przybysław Dyjamentowski (1694–1774), Polish writer and document forger

== Places ==
- Przybysław, Jarocin County in Greater Poland Voivodeship (west-central Poland)
- Przybysław, Słupca County in Greater Poland Voivodeship (west-central Poland)
- Przybysław, Kuyavian-Pomeranian Voivodeship (north-central Poland)
- Przybysław, Złotów County in Greater Poland Voivodeship (west-central Poland)
- Przybysław, West Pomeranian Voivodeship (north-west Poland)
- Nowy Przybysław in West Pomeranian Voivodeship (north-western Poland)
- Stary Przybysław in West Pomeranian Voivodeship (north-western Poland)

== See also ==
- Pribislav (disambiguation)
