= Role, West Pomeranian Voivodeship =

Role
- Village
- Location within Poland
- Coordinates: 53°50′3″N 15°54′32″E
- Country: Poland
- Voivodeship: West Pomeranian
- County: Świdwin
- Gmina: Rąbino

Role [ˈrɔlɛ] (German Röhlshof) is a village in the administrative district of Gmina Rąbino, within Świdwin County, West Pomeranian Voivodeship, in north-western Poland. It lies approximately 5 km (3 mi) south-west of Rąbino, 11 km (7 mi) north-east of Świdwin, and 100 km (62 mi) north-east of the regional capital Szczecin.

For the history of the region, see History of Pomerania.
