= Poradz, Świdwin County =

Poradz
- Village
- Location within Poland
- Coordinates: 53°56′7″N 15°36′46″E
- Country: Poland
- Voivodeship: West Pomeranian
- County: Świdwin
- Gmina: Sławoborze
- Population: 90

Poradz [ˈpɔrat͡s] (German: Petersfelde) is a village in the administrative district of Gmina Sławoborze, within Świdwin County, West Pomeranian Voivodeship, in north-western Poland. It lies approximately 9 km (6 mi) north-west of Sławoborze, 20 km (12 mi) north-west of Świdwin, and 89 km (55 mi) north-east of the regional capital Szczecin.

For the history of the region, see History of Pomerania.

The village has a population of 90.
