= Zbytki, West Pomeranian Voivodeship =

Zbytki
- Village
- Location within Poland
- Coordinates: 53°53′23″N 15°54′55″E
- Country: Poland
- Voivodeship: West Pomeranian
- County: Świdwin
- Gmina: Rąbino

Zbytki [ˈzbɨtki] is a village in the administrative district of Gmina Rąbino, within Świdwin County, West Pomeranian Voivodeship, in north-western Poland. It lies approximately 4 km (2 mi) north-west of Rąbino, 16 km (10 mi) north-east of Świdwin, and 103 km (64 mi) north-east of the regional capital Szczecin.

For the history of the region, see History of Pomerania.
