= Sobiemirowo =

- Settlement
- Location within Poland
- Coordinates: 53°51′38″N 15°40′22″E
- Country: Poland
- Voivodeship: West Pomeranian
- County: Świdwin
- Gmina: Sławoborze

Sobiemirowo [sɔbjɛmiˈrɔvɔ] (German: Schwarzsee) is a settlement in the administrative district of Gmina Sławoborze, within Świdwin County, West Pomeranian Voivodeship, in north-western Poland. It lies approximately 5 km (3 mi) south-west of Sławoborze, 11 km (7 mi) north-west of Świdwin, and 88 km (55 mi) north-east of the regional capital Szczecin.

For the history of the region, see History of Pomerania.
