= Biała Góra, Świdwin County =

Biała Góra
- Village
- Location within Poland
- Coordinates: 53°53′9″N 16°0′42″E
- Country: Poland
- Voivodeship: West Pomeranian
- County: Świdwin
- Gmina: Rąbino
- Population: 180

Biała Góra [ˈbjawa ˈɡura] (German: Ballenberg) is a village in the administrative district of Gmina Rąbino, within Świdwin County, West Pomeranian Voivodeship, in north-western Poland. It lies approximately 6 km (4 mi) north-east of Rąbino, 20 km (12 mi) north-east of Świdwin, and 108 km (67 mi) north-east of the regional capital Szczecin.

The village has a population of 180.
