= Słowenkowo =

- Village
- Location within Poland
- Coordinates: 53°57′15″N 15°40′8″E
- Country: Poland
- Voivodeship: West Pomeranian
- County: Świdwin
- Gmina: Sławoborze
- Population: 140

Słowenkowo [swɔvɛnˈkɔvɔ] (German: Neugasthof) is a village in the administrative district of Gmina Sławoborze, within Świdwin County, West Pomeranian Voivodeship, in north-western Poland. It lies approximately 8 km (5 mi) north of Sławoborze, 21 km (13 mi) north of Świdwin, and 94 km (58 mi) north-east of the regional capital Szczecin.

The village has a population of 140.
