= Gręzino =

Village in Poland

- Village
- Location within Poland
- Coordinates: 53°50′5″N 15°59′22″E
- Country: Poland
- Voivodeship: West Pomeranian
- County: Świdwin
- Gmina: Rąbino

Gręzino [ɡrɛ̃ˈʑinɔ] (formerly German Granzin) is a village in the administrative district of Gmina Rąbino, within Świdwin County, West Pomeranian Voivodeship, in north-western Poland. It lies approximately 5 km (3 mi) south-east of Rąbino, 16 km (10 mi) east of Świdwin, and 104 km (65 mi) north-east of the regional capital Szczecin.

For the history of the region, see History of Pomerania.
