= Nielep =

- Village
- Location within Poland
- Coordinates: 53°50′18″N 15°50′38″E
- Country: Poland
- Voivodeship: West Pomeranian
- County: Świdwin
- Gmina: Rąbino
- Population: 360

Nielep [ˈɲɛlɛp] (German Nelep) is a village in the administrative district of Gmina Rąbino, within Świdwin County, West Pomeranian Voivodeship, in north-western Poland. It lies approximately 8 km (5 mi) south-west of Rąbino, 8 km (5 mi) north-east of Świdwin, and 96 km (60 mi) north-east of the regional capital Szczecin.

For the history of the region, see History of Pomerania.

The village has a population of 360.
