= Stare Ludzicko =

- Village
- Location within Poland
- Coordinates: 53°48′54″N 16°1′50″E
- Country: Poland
- Voivodeship: West Pomeranian
- County: Świdwin
- Gmina: Rąbino
- Population: 260

Stare Ludzicko [ˈstarɛ luˈd͡ʑit͡skɔ] (German: Lutzig) is a village in the administrative district of Gmina Rąbino, within Świdwin County, West Pomeranian Voivodeship, in north-western Poland. It lies approximately 9 km (6 mi) south-east of Rąbino, 18 km (11 mi) east of Świdwin, and 106 km (66 mi) north-east of the regional capital Szczecin.

For the history of the region, see History of Pomerania.
