= Krzecko =

- Village
- Location within Poland
- Coordinates: 53°53′N 15°46′E
- Country: Poland
- Voivodeship: West Pomeranian
- County: Świdwin
- Gmina: Sławoborze

Krzecko [ˈkʂɛt͡skɔ] (German Kreitzig) is a village in the administrative district of Gmina Sławoborze, within Świdwin County, West Pomeranian Voivodeship, in north-western Poland. It lies approximately 4 km (2 mi) east of Sławoborze, 12 km (7 mi) north of Świdwin, and 94 km (58 mi) north-east of the regional capital Szczecin.

For the history of the region, see History of Pomerania.
