= Kłodzino, Świdwin County =

Kłodzino
- Village
- Location within Poland
- Coordinates: 53°52′17″N 15°49′53″E
- Country: Poland
- Voivodeship: West Pomeranian
- County: Świdwin
- Gmina: Rąbino
- Population: 140

Kłodzino [kwɔˈd͡ʑinɔ] (German: Klötzin) is a village in the administrative district of Gmina Rąbino, within Świdwin County, West Pomeranian Voivodeship, in north-western Poland. It lies approximately 8 km (5 mi) west of Rąbino, 11 km (7 mi) north-east of Świdwin, and 97 km (60 mi) north-east of the regional capital Szczecin.

For the history of the region, see History of Pomerania.

The village has a population of 140.
