= Głodzino =

- Village
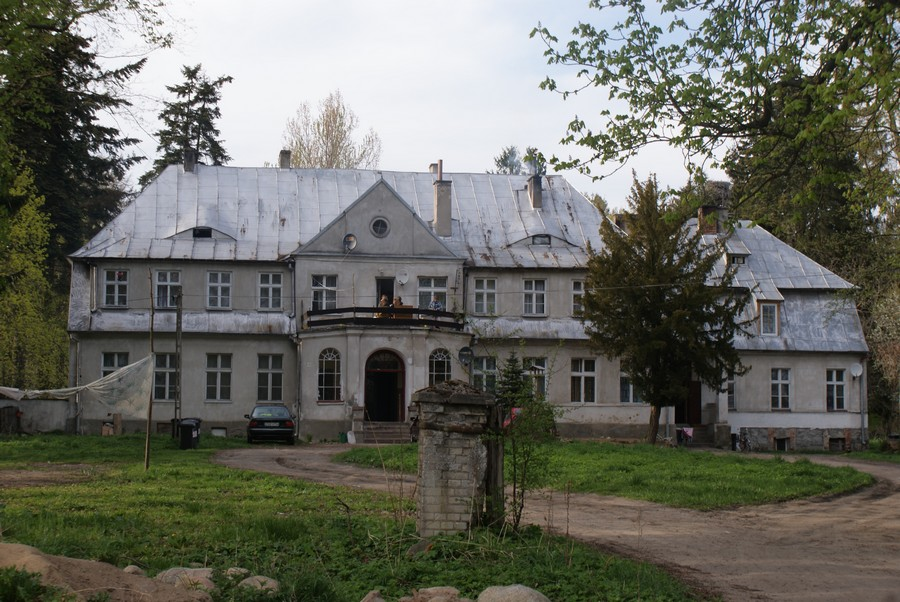
- An old manor in Głodzino.

- Location within Poland
- Coordinates: 53°53′N 15°53′E
- Country: Poland
- Voivodeship: West Pomeranian
- County: Świdwin
- Gmina: Rąbino

Głodzino [ɡwɔˈd͡ʑinɔ] (German Glötzin) is a village in the administrative district of Gmina Rąbino, within Świdwin County, West Pomeranian Voivodeship, in north-western Poland. It lies approximately 5 km (3 mi) north-west of Rąbino, 14 km (9 mi) north-east of Świdwin, and 101 km (63 mi) north-east of the regional capital Szczecin.

For the history of the region, see History of Pomerania.
