= Sidłowo =

- Village
- Location within Poland
- Coordinates: 53°54′N 15°45′E
- Country: Poland
- Voivodeship: West Pomeranian
- County: Świdwin
- Gmina: Sławoborze

Sidłowo [ɕiˈdwɔvɔ] (German Zietlow) is a village in the administrative district of Gmina Sławoborze, within Świdwin County, West Pomeranian Voivodeship, in north-western Poland. It lies approximately 3 km (2 mi) east of Sławoborze, 13 km (8 mi) north of Świdwin, and 94 km (58 mi) north-east of the regional capital Szczecin.
