= Rokosowo, West Pomeranian Voivodeship =

Rokosowo
- Village
- Location within Poland
- Coordinates: 53°56′N 15°43′E
- Country: Poland
- Voivodeship: West Pomeranian
- County: Świdwin
- Gmina: Sławoborze
- Population: 350

Rokosowo [rɔkɔˈsɔvɔ] (German Rogzow) is a village in the administrative district of Gmina Sławoborze, within Świdwin County, West Pomeranian Voivodeship, in north-western Poland. It lies approximately 5 km (3 mi) north of Sławoborze, 17 km (11 mi) north of Świdwin, and 95 km (59 mi) north-east of the regional capital Szczecin.

For the history of the region, see History of Pomerania.

The village has a population of 350.
