= Zagrody, West Pomeranian Voivodeship =

Zagrody
- Settlement
- Location within Poland
- Coordinates: 53°52′51″N 15°40′47″E
- Country: Poland
- Voivodeship: West Pomeranian
- County: Świdwin
- Gmina: Sławoborze

Zagrody [zaˈɡrɔdɨ] (German: Vierhof) is a settlement in the administrative district of Gmina Sławoborze, within Świdwin County, West Pomeranian Voivodeship, in north-western Poland. It lies approximately 3 km (2 mi) south-west of Sławoborze, 13 km (8 mi) north-west of Świdwin, and 89 km (55 mi) north-east of the regional capital Szczecin.

For the history of the region, see History of Pomerania.
