= Drzeń =

- Settlement
- Location within Poland
- Coordinates: 53°54′30″N 15°37′30″E
- Country: Poland
- Voivodeship: West Pomeranian
- County: Świdwin
- Gmina: Sławoborze

Drzeń [dʐɛɲ] (German: Dryhn) is a settlement in the administrative district of Gmina Sławoborze, within Świdwin County, West Pomeranian Voivodeship, in north-western Poland. It lies approximately 6 km (4 mi) west of Sławoborze, 17 km (11 mi) north-west of Świdwin, and 88 km (55 mi) north-east of the regional capital Szczecin.

== See also ==
- History of Pomerania
