= Trzciana, West Pomeranian Voivodeship =

Trzciana
- Village
- Location within Poland
- Coordinates: 53°53′18″N 15°40′11″E
- Country: Poland
- Voivodeship: West Pomeranian
- County: Świdwin
- Gmina: Sławoborze

Trzciana [ˈtʂt͡ɕana] (formerly German Schönau) is a village in the administrative district of Gmina Sławoborze, within Świdwin County, West Pomeranian Voivodeship, in north-western Poland. It lies approximately 3 km (2 mi) west of Sławoborze, 14 km (9 mi) north-west of Świdwin, and 89 km (55 mi) north-east of the regional capital Szczecin.

For the history of the region, see History of Pomerania.
