= Biały Zdrój, Świdwin County =

Biały Zdrój
- Village
- Location within Poland
- Coordinates: 53°50′N 15°46′E
- Country: Poland
- Voivodeship: West Pomeranian
- County: Świdwin
- Gmina: Sławoborze

Biały Zdrój [ˈbjawɨ ˈzdrui̯] (German Balsdrey) is a village in the administrative district of Gmina Sławoborze, within Świdwin County, West Pomeranian Voivodeship, in north-western Poland. It lies approximately 8 km (5 mi) south-east of Sławoborze, 6 km (4 mi) north of Świdwin, and 91 km (57 mi) north-east of the regional capital Szczecin.
