= Paszęcin =

- Village
- Location within Poland
- Coordinates: 53°50′22″N 15°57′50″E
- Country: Poland
- Voivodeship: West Pomeranian
- County: Świdwin
- Gmina: Rąbino
- Population: 210

Paszęcin [paˈʂɛnt͡ɕin] (German: Passentin) is a village in the administrative district of Gmina Rąbino, within Świdwin County, West Pomeranian Voivodeship, in north-western Poland. It lies approximately 4 km (2 mi) south-east of Rąbino, 15 km (9 mi) north-east of Świdwin, and 103 km (64 mi) north-east of the regional capital Szczecin.

For the history of the region, see History of Pomerania.

The village has a population of 210.
