= Mysłowice, West Pomeranian Voivodeship =

Mysłowice
- Village
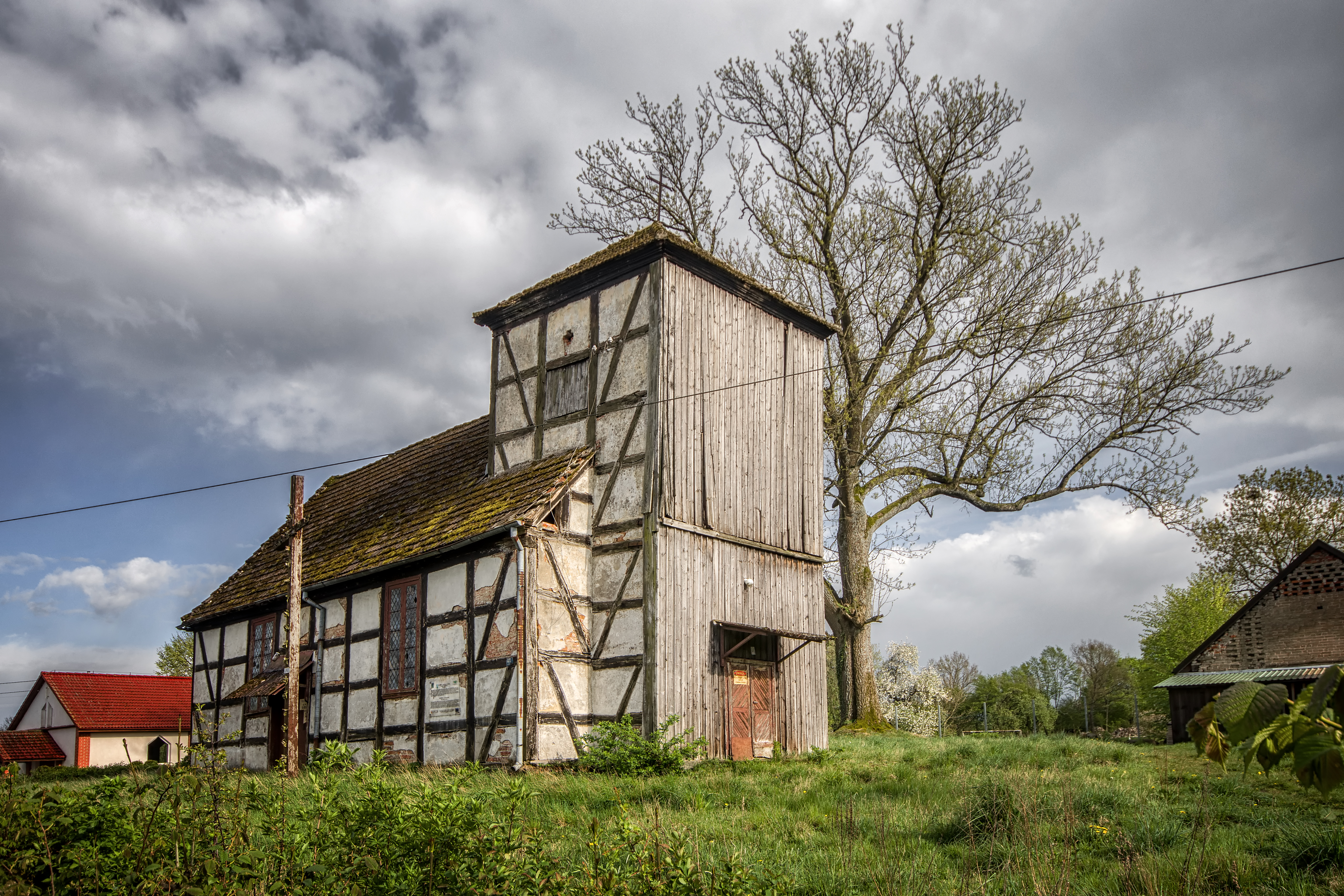
- Saint Józef Church

- Location within Poland
- Coordinates: 53°53′N 15°38′E
- Country: Poland
- Voivodeship: West Pomeranian
- County: Świdwin
- Gmina: Sławoborze

Mysłowice [mɨswɔˈvit͡sɛ] (German: Moitzelfitz) is a village in the administrative district of Gmina Sławoborze, within Świdwin County, West Pomeranian Voivodeship, in north-western Poland. It lies approximately 6 km (4 mi) west of Sławoborze, 15 km (9 mi) north-west of Świdwin, and 87 km (54 mi) north-east of the regional capital Szczecin.

For the history of the region, see History of Pomerania.
