= Powalice, Świdwin County =

Powalice
- Village
- Location within Poland
- Coordinates: 53°53′N 15°35′E
- Country: Poland
- Voivodeship: West Pomeranian
- County: Świdwin
- Gmina: Sławoborze

Powalice [pɔvaˈlit͡sɛ] (German Petershagen) is a village in the administrative district of Gmina Sławoborze, within Świdwin County, West Pomeranian Voivodeship, in north-western Poland. It lies approximately 9 km (6 mi) west of Sławoborze, 17 km (11 mi) north-west of Świdwin, and 84 km (52 mi) north-east of the regional capital Szczecin.

For the history of the region, see History of Pomerania.
