= Battle of Falkenberg =

- Part of Thirty Years' War
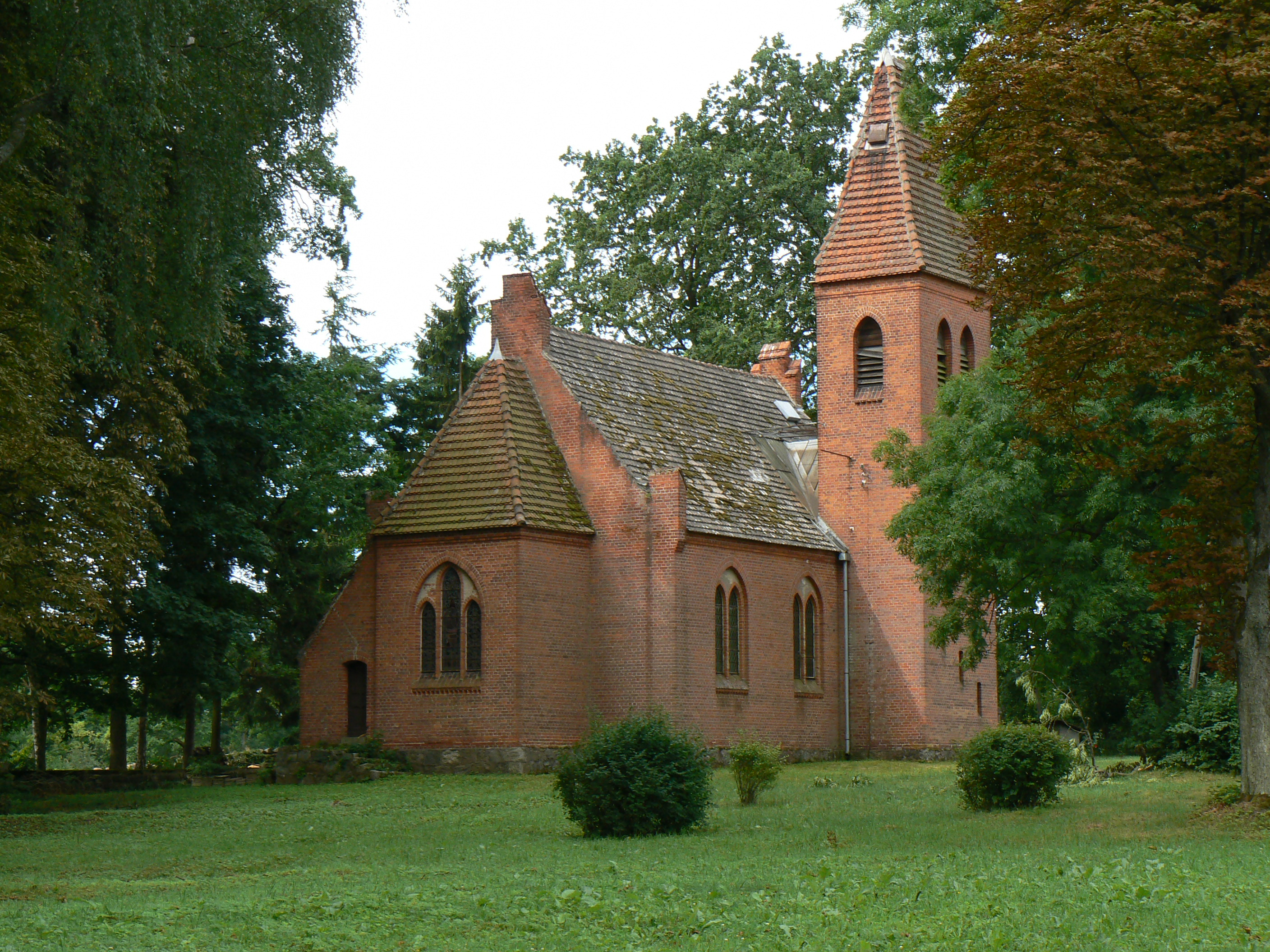
- Church of the Assumption in Jastrzębniki
Date	13 November 1630
Location	Falkenberg, Pomerania (now Jastrzębniki, Poland)
Result	Swedish victory

Belligerents
(yes) Swedish Empire	Holy Roman Empire

Commanders and leaders
Gustav Horn; Dodo zu Knyphausen; Wolf von Baudissin; Maximillian Teuffel; John Hepburn	Fernando da Capua

Units involved
Swedish Armed Forces	Army of the Holy Roman Empire

Strength
3,700 men 1,000 Infantry; 2,700 Cavalry	3,500 men 2,000 Infantry; 1,500 Cavalry; 2 Cannons

The Battle of Falkenberg (Swedish: Slaget vid Falkenberg; Polish: Bitwa pod Falkenbergiem) was a battle during the Thirty Years' War. The battle was fought between Swedish and Holy Roman forces on 13 November 1630 at Falkenberg in Pomerania (now Poland).

== Background ==
=== Context ===
The Thirty Years' War began in 1618 caused by a rise in religious tensions within Europe. Other factors behind it were economic reasons. A development took place in July 1630, with the Swedish intervention which opened a new front in the conflict. King Gustavus Adolphus of Sweden made no formal declaration of war against the Catholic powers. He decided he had sufficient reason to land without declaring war. He did make attempts to come to an agreement with the Emperor of the Holy Roman Empire, but these negotiations were not taken seriously by either side.

=== Pre-battle ===
After establishing himself on the islands of Usedom and Wollin, and taking the important city of Stettin, Gustav II Adolf began attempts to conquer the many fortresses around Pomerania. From Gartz, constant reinforcements were sent against Kolberg, but these were often blocked by the Swedes. Therefore, a 3,500-man army under the command of Fernando da Capua marched out of Gartz on 4 November, to reach Kolberg via Dramburg and Schivelbein. On 8 November, the Swedish commander in these areas, Dodo zu Innhausen und Knyphausen, received information about the enemy's movements, and on the same day received orders from Gustav Horn to unite their two armies at Treptow an der Rega. Horn left Alexander Leslie as commander in Stettin and was able to unite with Knyphausen at Gross Jestin on 12 November, where there were now 5,500 men and five cannons. At three o'clock in the morning the next day the enemy was heard, but now retreating before the larger Swedish army. Horn immediately marched after and captured small enemy detachments around the towns. From these he was informed that the enemy was two hours ahead, after which Horn gathered all the cavalry and 1000 infantry to catch up more quickly, while the remaining infantry and artillery moved slowly behind under the command of Heinrich Matthias von Thurn. At Stolzenberg the enemy was finally reached, who were arrayed in battle formation at the small town of Falkenberg.

== Battle ==
As the battle was about to begin, a thick fog fell over the battlefield, making it impossible to see anything, but Horn nevertheless continued to try to defeat the enemy. He wanted to force the rear guard into the enemy infantry, to cause disorder and give von Thurn time to reach the battlefield. Horn therefore ordered Wolf Heinrich von Baudissin to attack with parts of the cavalry. Initially the attack met with success, but soon von Baudissin ran into the enemy infantry, which forced him back. As a result of the fog, no proper attack against the enemy army could be made, and after a few more futile attacks with the cavalry, the enemy was able to continue their retreat, without any major losses on either side.

== Consequences ==
The battle is considered the first actual field battle during the Swedish phase of the war. After the battle, the enemy army retreated to Gartz while the Swedish army met Gustav II Adolf at Greifenberg, from where it then dispersed and returned to the positions it held before the battle.

== See also ==
- List of battles of the Thirty Years' War

== Sources ==
=== Bibliography ===
- Dodge, Theodore A. (1895) [1996]. Gustavus Adolphus: A history of the art of war from its revival after the Middle Ages to the end of the Spanish Succession War, with a detailed account of the campaigns of the great Swede, and of the most famous campaigns of Turenne, Condé, Eugene and Marlborough. Houghton, Mifflin. ISBN 978-1853672347. OCLC 33899011.
- Starbäck, Carl Georg & Bäckström, Per Olof (1885). Berättelser ur Svenska Historien, Volym 4
- Mankell, Julius (1854). Arkiv till upplysning om svenska krigens och krigsinrättningarnes historia
