= Jastrzębniki, West Pomeranian Voivodeship =

Jastrzębniki
- Village
- Interactive map of Jastrzębniki
- Location within Poland
- Coordinates: 53°51′N 15°43′E
- Country: Poland
- Voivodeship: West Pomeranian
- County: Świdwin
- Gmina: Sławoborze

Jastrzębniki [jastʂɛmbˈniki] (German: Falkenberg) is a village in the administrative district of Gmina Sławoborze, within Świdwin County, West Pomeranian Voivodeship, in north-western Poland. It lies approximately 5 km (3 mi) south of Sławoborze, 9 km (6 mi) north-west of Świdwin, and 89 km (55 mi) north-east of the regional capital Szczecin.

== History ==
The Battle of Falkenberg, fought in 13 November 1630 was fought at Jastrzębniki.

== Notable residents ==
- Reinhold Wulle (1882-1950), politician
