= Nowe Ślepce =

Nowe Ślepce, Poland
- Village
- Location within Poland
- Coordinates: 53°55′41″N 15°40′21″E
- Country: Poland
- Voivodeship: West Pomeranian
- County: Świdwin
- Gmina: Sławoborze
- Population: 60

Nowe Ślepce [ˈnɔvɛ ˈɕlɛpt͡sɛ] (German: Neu Schleps) is a village in the administrative district of Gmina Sławoborze, within Świdwin County, West Pomeranian Voivodeship, in north-western Poland. It lies approximately 5 km (3 mi) north-west of Sławoborze, 18 km (11 mi) north of Świdwin, and 92 km (57 mi) north-east of the regional capital Szczecin.

For the history of the region, see History of Pomerania.

The village has a population of 60.
