= Rąbinko =

- Village
- Location within Poland
- Coordinates: 53°52′50″N 15°56′10″E
- Country: Poland
- Voivodeship: West Pomeranian
- County: Świdwin
- Gmina: Rąbino
- Population: 160

Rąbinko [rɔmˈbinkɔ] (German: Klein Rambin) is a village in the administrative district of Gmina Rąbino, within Świdwin County, West Pomeranian Voivodeship, in north-western Poland. It lies approximately 2 km (1 mi) north of Rąbino, 16 km (10 mi) north-east of Świdwin, and 104 km (65 mi) north-east of the regional capital Szczecin.

For the history of the region, see History of Pomerania.

The village has a population of 160.
