= Ciechnowo =

- Village
- Location within Poland
- Coordinates: 53°52′N 15°44′E
- Country: Poland
- Voivodeship: West Pomeranian
- County: Świdwin
- Gmina: Sławoborze

Ciechnowo [t͡ɕɛxˈnɔvɔ] (German Technow) is a village in the administrative district of Gmina Sławoborze, within Świdwin County, West Pomeranian Voivodeship, in north-western Poland. It lies approximately 4 km (2 mi) south-east of Sławoborze, 10 km (6 mi) north of Świdwin, and 91 km (57 mi) north-east of the regional capital Szczecin.
