= Dąbrowa Białogardzka =

- Village
- Location within Poland
- Coordinates: 53°48′N 15°53′E
- Country: Poland
- Voivodeship: West Pomeranian
- County: Świdwin
- Gmina: Rąbino

Dąbrowa Białogardzka [dɔmˈbrɔva bjawɔˈɡart͡ska] (German: Damerow) is a village in the administrative district of Gmina Rąbino, within Świdwin County, West Pomeranian Voivodeship, in north-western Poland. It lies approximately 9 km (6 mi) south-west of Rąbino, 8 km (5 mi) east of Świdwin, and 96 km (60 mi) north-east of the regional capital Szczecin.
