= Priebe =

Priebe is a surname. Although mainly found in German-speaking countries, it is derived from the Slavic name Pribislav.

Notable people with the surname include:

- Berl Priebe (1918–2014), American farmer and politician
- Jeanette Brooks Priebe (born 1937), director of the Louisville Civil Service Board
- Josh Priebe (born 2001), American football player
- Karl Priebe (1914–1976), American painter
- Kenneth E. Priebe (1912–1986), American politician
- Stefan Priebe, German-British psychologist
