= Rzecino =

- Village
- Location within Poland
- Coordinates: 53°50′36″N 15°59′48″E
- Country: Poland
- Voivodeship: West Pomeranian
- County: Świdwin
- Gmina: Rąbino
- Population: 350

Rzecino [ʐɛˈt͡ɕinɔ] (German Retzin) is a village in the administrative district of Gmina Rąbino, within Świdwin County, West Pomeranian Voivodeship, in north-western Poland. It lies approximately 5 km (3 mi) south-east of Rąbino, 17 km (11 mi) north-east of Świdwin, and 105 km (65 mi) north-east of the regional capital Szczecin.
