= Międzyrzecze, West Pomeranian Voivodeship =

Międzyrzecze
- Village
- Location within Poland
- Coordinates: 53°52′7″N 15°34′1″E
- Country: Poland
- Voivodeship: West Pomeranian
- County: Świdwin
- Gmina: Sławoborze
- Population: 90

Międzyrzecze [mjɛnd͡zɨˈʐɛt͡ʂɛ] (German: Meseritz) is a village in the administrative district of Gmina Sławoborze, within Świdwin County, West Pomeranian Voivodeship, in north-western Poland. It lies approximately 10 km (6 mi) west of Sławoborze, 17 km (11 mi) north-west of Świdwin, and 83 km (52 mi) north-east of the regional capital Szczecin.

For the history of the region, see History of Pomerania.

The village has a population of 90.
