= Dąbrówka, Świdwin County =

Dąbrówka
- Village
- Location within Poland
- Coordinates: 53°51′41″N 15°53′24″E
- Country: Poland
- Voivodeship: West Pomeranian
- County: Świdwin
- Gmina: Rąbino

Dąbrówka [dɔmˈbrufka] (German: Klein Damerow) is a village in the administrative district of Gmina Rąbino, within Świdwin County, West Pomeranian Voivodeship, in north-western Poland. It lies approximately 4 km (2 mi) west of Rąbino, 12 km (7 mi) north-east of Świdwin, and 100 km (62 mi) north-east of the regional capital Szczecin.
