= Kalina, West Pomeranian Voivodeship =

Kalina
- Village
- Location within Poland
- Coordinates: 53°55′50″N 15°38′16″E
- Country: Poland
- Voivodeship: West Pomeranian
- County: Świdwin
- Gmina: Sławoborze
- Population: 30

Kalina (Polish pronunciation: [kaˈlina]; German: Meierei) is a village in the administrative district of Gmina Sławoborze, within Świdwin County, West Pomeranian Voivodeship, in north-western Poland. It lies approximately 7 km (4 mi) north-west of Sławoborze, 19 km (12 mi) north-west of Świdwin, and 90 km (56 mi) north-east of the regional capital Szczecin.

The village has a population of 30.
