= Biernów =

- Village
- Location within Poland
- Coordinates: 53°50′28″N 16°3′2″E
- Country: Poland
- Voivodeship: West Pomeranian
- County: Świdwin
- Gmina: Rąbino

Biernów [ˈbjɛrnuf] (German: Quisbernow) is a village in the administrative district of Gmina Rąbino, within Świdwin County, West Pomeranian Voivodeship, in north-western Poland. It lies approximately 8 km (5 mi) east of Rąbino, 20 km (12 mi) east of Świdwin, and 108 km (67 mi) north-east of the regional capital Szczecin.
