= Stare Ślepce =

- Village
- Location within Poland
- Coordinates: 53°55′8″N 15°40′57″E
- Country: Poland
- Voivodeship: West Pomeranian
- County: Świdwin
- Gmina: Sławoborze

Stare Ślepce [ˈstarɛ ˈɕlɛpt͡sɛ] (German: Alt Schleps) is a village in the administrative district of Gmina Sławoborze, within Świdwin County, West Pomeranian Voivodeship, in north-western Poland. It lies approximately 4 km (2 mi) north-west of Sławoborze, 17 km (11 mi) north of Świdwin, and 92 km (57 mi) north-east of the regional capital Szczecin.

For the history of the region, see History of Pomerania.
