= Polakowo, Świdwin County =

Polakowo
- Village
- Location within Poland
- Coordinates: 53°50′59″N 15°52′41″E
- Country: Poland
- Voivodeship: West Pomeranian
- County: Świdwin
- Gmina: Rąbino

Polakowo [pɔlaˈkɔvɔ] is a village in the administrative district of Gmina Rąbino, within Świdwin County, West Pomeranian Voivodeship, in north-western Poland. It lies approximately 5 km (3 mi) south-west of Rąbino, 11 km (7 mi) north-east of Świdwin, and 99 km (62 mi) north-east of the regional capital Szczecin.

For the history of the region, see History of Pomerania.
