= Krzesimowo =

- Village
- Location within Poland
- Coordinates: 53°54′35″N 15°41′16″E
- Country: Poland
- Voivodeship: West Pomeranian
- County: Świdwin
- Gmina: Sławoborze

Krzesimowo [kʂɛɕiˈmɔvɔ] (German: Emmyhütten) is a village in the administrative district of Gmina Sławoborze, within Świdwin County, West Pomeranian Voivodeship, in north-western Poland. It lies approximately 3 km (2 mi) north-west of Sławoborze, 15 km (9 mi) north of Świdwin, and 92 km (57 mi) north-east of the regional capital Szczecin.

For the history of the region, see History of Pomerania.
