= Mustafa Celalettin Pasha =

Ottoman-Polish strategist, writer, and military official

Mustafa Celâleddin Pasha
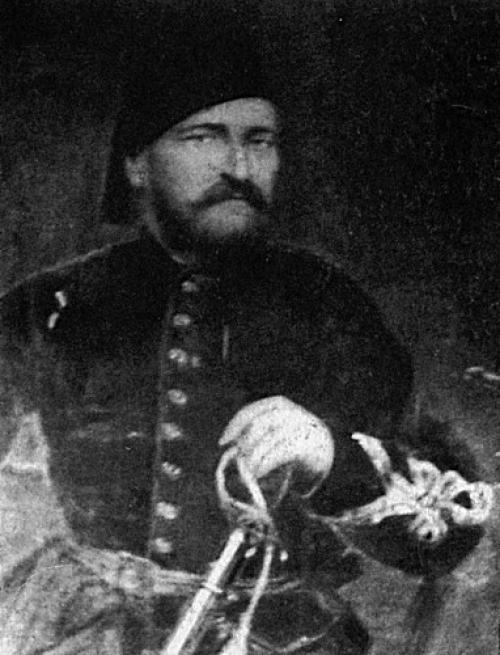
- Mustafa Celalettin Pasha
- Born: 10 April 1826; Modrzewiec, Congress Poland, Russian Empire
- Died: 9 October 1876 (aged 50); Novosela, Kosovo Vilayet, Ottoman Empire
- Spouse: Saffet Khanum
- Children: Hasan Enver Pasha
- Military career
- Allegiance: Ottoman Empire
- Branch: Ottoman Army
- Rank: Mirliva (Major General)
- Conflicts: Ottoman-Iranian Border Conflicts; Crimean War; Montenegro Crisis (1876)

Mustafa Celâleddin Pasha (born Konstanty Półkozic-Borzęcki; 10 April 1826 – 9 October 1876) was a Polish-born Ottoman military officer, strategist, and intellectual. He was a participant in the 1848 Revolutions in Poland and Hungary before seeking asylum in the Ottoman Empire, where he served as an officer for 27 years.

He is best known for his 1869 work Eski ve Modern Türkler (The Ancient and Modern Turks), in which he advocated for Turkish identity and the adoption of the Latin alphabet over the Arabic script. He was the maternal great-grandfather of the famous Turkish poet Nâzım Hikmet.

== Early life and exile ==
Born in the village of Modrzewiec into a noble family with six children, he was the second child. At a young age, he spoke not only his native Polish but also Russian and French, and was proficient in Latin and German.

After graduating from high school in Piotrków in 1844, he enrolled at the Academy of Fine Arts in Warsaw due to his artistic talent. However, after two years, he surprisingly transferred to a priest school in Włocławek, from which he withdrew a year later. Influenced by the 1848 Revolutions, he joined the uprisings in Poznań alongside a friend.

When the Prussians suppressed the uprising, he was captured and sent to Magdeburg prison in May. After his release, he fled to France. Feeling unsafe there, he sought asylum in 1849 in the Ottoman Empire, which had refused to extradite Polish and Hungarian revolutionaries to Russia. He arrived in Istanbul as part of a group of Polish refugees accepted by Sultan Abdülmecid I.

There he adopted a new name, Mustafa Celalettin Pasha, and was circumcised and converted to Islam in 1849. He married Saffet Khanum, a daughter of Omer Pasha, a native Serbian who converted to Islam; they had one son, Hasan Enver Pasha.

In the Ottoman Empire he became famous on the battlefield in numerous wars from 1852 on. He was captain of the Ottoman General Staff and the chief of the department of cartography, and received the rank of Major General.

He was killed in the war with Montenegro. His body was placed in a mosque in Albania, where he was buried as an Ottoman hero.

== Military career ==
Mustafa Celâleddin caught the attention of Reşid Pasha due to his superior skills in cartography and his knowledge of multiple foreign languages. He entered the Ottoman Army as a captain and was assigned to the cartography department.

Two years later, he visited the Shaykh al-Islam of the Ottoman Empire, converted to Islam, and was given the name "Mustafa Celaleddin" by the Shaykh al-Islam. He later married the daughter of Omer Lütfi Pasha, a major general in the General Staff of the Ottoman Army.

He participated in all major wars the Ottoman Empire fought against Russia during that period. He rose to the rank of Mirliva (Major General) and commanded military corps. In the 1876 Montenegro Crisis, he was wounded in the abdomen while commanding the Shkodër Corps. He died six months later in Novosela in 1876.

== Intellectual activities and writings ==
His political writings began during his time as an officer. He advocated for the idea of Turkism long before the rise of groups such as the Young Ottomans, Young Turks, and Committee of Union and Progress. In this regard, he influenced figures such as Ahmed Vefik Pasha, Şemseddin Sami, Yusuf Akçura, and Mehmet Emin Yurdakul.

He was an effective figure during the transition from dynastic historiography to national historiography in Turkish history. He claimed that Russians were the most barbaric people among the Slavic nations, while Turks were the oldest and most civilized people on Earth. Another view he supported was the assumption that the Latin language and civilization were of Turkish origin, a theory he reached by drawing parallels between certain Latin words/place names and Turkish words.

=== Les Turcs Anciens et Modernes ===
His influence outside of the military lay in the fields of the Turkish language, Turkism, and Turkish history. His book, Eski ve Modern Türkler (The Ancient and Modern Turks), was published in French in 1869 in Istanbul.

The book was printed at the press of the Courrier d'Orient newspaper and dedicated to Sultan Abdülmecid I. It became influential in Europe, and a second edition was published in Paris the following year.

In this work, Celâleddin Pasha discussed what needed to be done to ensure the continuity, unity, and prosperity of the Ottoman Empire, a multi-ethnic state. He attempted to introduce the Turks to Europeans. Prominent topics in the book included ancient Turkic peoples, Turkish history, Turkish culture, the Turkish language, and the founding of the Ottoman Empire.

== Legacy and the Atatürk connection ==
A copy of the Paris edition of his book was owned by Mustafa Kemal Atatürk, the founder of modern Turkey. It is believed that he acquired the book from Ali Fuat Cebesoy.

Atatürk read the book and reportedly wrote notes in the margins of some pages with phrases such as "very important" (çok mühim), "attention" (dikkat), and "do not exaggerate" (abartma). This specific copy is currently preserved in the Anıtkabir Museum.

== See also ==
- Turkish nationalism
- Ottoman military reform
- Polish emigration to the Ottoman Empire
