= Gąsków =

- Village
- Location within Poland
- Coordinates: 53°54′N 15°56′E
- Country: Poland
- Voivodeship: West Pomeranian
- County: Świdwin
- Gmina: Rąbino

Gąsków [ˈɡɔ̃skuf] (formerly German Ganzkow) is a village in the administrative district of Gmina Rąbino, within Świdwin County, West Pomeranian Voivodeship, in north-western Poland. It lies approximately 4 km (2 mi) north of Rąbino, 17 km (11 mi) north-east of Świdwin, and 104 km (65 mi) north-east of the regional capital Szczecin.

For the history of the region, see History of Pomerania.
