= Dołganów =

- Village
- Location within Poland
- Coordinates: 53°53′0″N 15°48′48″E
- Country: Poland
- Voivodeship: West Pomeranian
- County: Świdwin
- Gmina: Rąbino

Dołganów [dɔu̯ˈɡanuf] (German: Dolgenow) is a village in the administrative district of Gmina Rąbino, within Świdwin County, West Pomeranian Voivodeship, in north-western Poland. It lies approximately 9 km (6 mi) west of Rąbino, 12 km (7 mi) north of Świdwin, and 97 km (60 mi) north-east of the regional capital Szczecin.

For the history of the region, see History of Pomerania.
