= Klępczewo =

- Village
- Location within Poland
- Coordinates: 53°47′11″N 15°42′18″E
- Country: Poland
- Voivodeship: West Pomeranian
- County: Świdwin
- Gmina: Świdwin
- Population: 850

Klępczewo [klɛmpˈt͡ʂɛvɔ] (German Klemzow) is a village in the administrative district of Gmina Świdwin, within Świdwin County, West Pomeranian Voivodeship, in north-western Poland. It lies approximately 5 km (3 mi) west of Świdwin and 85 km (53 mi) north-east of the regional capital Szczecin.

The village has a population of 850.
