= Lipce, West Pomeranian Voivodeship =

Lipce
- Village
- Location within Poland
- Coordinates: 53°44′0″N 15°40′31″E
- Country: Poland
- Voivodeship: West Pomeranian
- County: Świdwin
- Gmina: Świdwin
- Population: 100

Lipce [ˈlipt͡sɛ] (German Liepz) is a village in the administrative district of Gmina Świdwin, within Świdwin County, West Pomeranian Voivodeship, in north-western Poland. It lies approximately 9 km (6 mi) south-west of Świdwin and 81 km (50 mi) north-east of the regional capital Szczecin.

For the history of the region, see History of Pomerania.
