= Rogalino =

- Village
- Location within Poland
- Coordinates: 53°49′N 15°51′E
- Country: Poland
- Voivodeship: West Pomeranian
- County: Świdwin
- Gmina: Świdwin

Rogalino [rɔɡaˈlinɔ] (German: Röglin) is a village in the administrative district of Gmina Świdwin, within Świdwin County, West Pomeranian Voivodeship, in north-western Poland. It lies approximately 7 km (4 mi) north-east of Świdwin and 95 km (59 mi) north-east of the regional capital Szczecin.

== See also ==
History of Pomerania
