= Kunowo, Świdwin County =

Kunowo
- Settlement
- Location within Poland
- Coordinates: 53°48′46″N 15°42′5″E
- Country: Poland
- Voivodeship: West Pomeranian
- County: Świdwin
- Gmina: Świdwin

Kunowo [kuˈnɔvɔ] (German: Kuhnow) is a settlement in the administrative district of Gmina Świdwin, within Świdwin County, West Pomeranian Voivodeship, in north-western Poland. It lies approximately 6 km (4 mi) north-west of Świdwin and 86 km (53 mi) north-east of the regional capital Szczecin.

== See also ==
- History of Pomerania
