= Czarnolesie, West Pomeranian Voivodeship =

Czarnolesie
- Settlement
- Location within Poland
- Coordinates: 53°44′16″N 15°54′52″E
- Country: Poland
- Voivodeship: West Pomeranian
- County: Świdwin
- Gmina: Świdwin

Czarnolesie [t͡ʂarnɔˈlɛɕɛ] (German: Kielmhof) is a settlement in the administrative district of Gmina Świdwin, within Świdwin County, West Pomeranian Voivodeship, in north-western Poland. It lies approximately 11 km (7 mi) south-east of Świdwin and 95 km (59 mi) east of the regional capital Szczecin.
