= Krosino, Świdwin County =

Krosino
- Village
- Location within Poland
- Coordinates: 53°49′N 15°46′E
- Country: Poland
- Voivodeship: West Pomeranian
- County: Świdwin
- Gmina: Świdwin

Population
  - Total: 508
- Time zone: UTC+1 (CET)
  - Summer (DST): UTC+2 (CEST)
- Vehicle registration: ZSD

Krosino [krɔˈɕinɔ] (German: Grössin) is a village in the administrative district of Gmina Świdwin, within Świdwin County, West Pomeranian Voivodeship, in north-western Poland. It lies approximately 4 km (2 mi) north of Świdwin and 90 km (56 mi) north-east of the regional capital Szczecin.

The village has a population of 508.

During World War II, the German administration operated a forced labour subcamp of the Stalag II-D prisoner-of-war camp in the village.
