= Bystrzyna =

- Village
- Location within Poland
- Coordinates: 53°49′14″N 15°47′38″E
- Country: Poland
- Voivodeship: West Pomeranian
- County: Świdwin
- Gmina: Świdwin

Bystrzyna [bɨsˈtʂɨna] is a village in the administrative district of Gmina Świdwin, within Świdwin County, West Pomeranian Voivodeship, in north-western Poland. It lies approximately 5 km (3 mi) north-east of Świdwin and 92 km (57 mi) north-east of the regional capital Szczecin.
