= Kartlewo, Świdwin County =

Kartlewo
- Village
- Location within Poland
- Coordinates: 53°50′N 15°39′E
- Country: Poland
- Voivodeship: West Pomeranian
- County: Świdwin
- Gmina: Świdwin

Kartlewo [karˈtlɛvɔ] (German Kartlow) is a village in the administrative district of Gmina Świdwin, within Świdwin County, West Pomeranian Voivodeship, in north-western Poland. It lies approximately 10 km (6 mi) north-west of Świdwin and 85 km (53 mi) north-east of the regional capital Szczecin.
