= Jezierzyce, Świdwin County =

Jezierzyce
- Village
- Location within Poland
- Coordinates: 53°48′56″N 15°58′35″E
- Country: Poland
- Voivodeship: West Pomeranian
- County: Świdwin
- Gmina: Rąbino
- Population: 290

Jezierzyce [jɛʑɛˈʐɨt͡sɛ] is a village in the administrative district of Gmina Rąbino, within Świdwin County, West Pomeranian Voivodeship, in north-western Poland. It lies approximately 7 km (4 mi) south of Rąbino, 15 km (9 mi) east of Świdwin, and 103 km (64 mi) north-east of the regional capital Szczecin.

For the history of the region, see History of Pomerania.
