= Gmina Sławoborze =

Gmina Sławoborze Sławoborze Commune
- Gmina
- Coat of arms

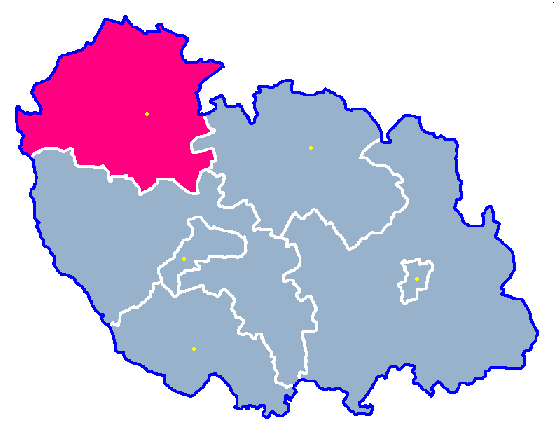
- Location in Świdwin County
- Coordinates (Sławoborze): 53°53′31″N 15°42′42″E
- Country: Poland
- Voivodeship: West Pomeranian
- County: Świdwin
- Seat: Sławoborze

Area
  - Total: 188.70 km^{2} (72.86 sq mi)

Population (2006)
  - Total: 4,274
  - Density: 22.65/km^{2} (58.66/sq mi)
- Website: Slawoborze

Gmina Sławoborze is a rural gmina (administrative district) in Świdwin County, West Pomeranian Voivodeship, in north-western Poland. Its seat is the village of Sławoborze, which lies approximately 13 kilometres (8 mi) north of Świdwin and 92 km (57 mi) north-east of the regional capital Szczecin.

The gmina covers an area of 188.70 square kilometres (72.9 sq mi). As of 2006, its total population is 4,274.

== Villages ==
Gmina Sławoborze contains the villages and settlements of Biały Zdrój, Ciechnowo, Drzeń, Jastrzębniki, Kalina, Krzecko, Krzesimowo, Lepino, Miedzno, Międzyrzecko, Międzyrzecze, Mysłowice, Nowe Ślepce, Pomorce, Poradz, Powalice, Pustowo, Rokosowo, Sidłowo, Sławkowo, Sławoborze, Słowenkowo, Słowieńsko, Sobiemirowo, Stare Ślepce, Trzciana and Zagrody.

== Neighbouring gminas ==
Gmina Sławoborze is bordered by the gminas of Białogard, Gościno, Karlino, Rąbino, Resko, Rymań and Świdwin.
