= Bełtno =

- Village
- Location within Poland
- Coordinates: 53°47′N 15°38′E
- Country: Poland
- Voivodeship: West Pomeranian
- County: Świdwin
- Gmina: Świdwin
- Population: 174

Bełtno [ˈbɛu̯tnɔ] (German: Boltenhagen) is a village in the administrative district of Gmina Świdwin, within Świdwin County, West Pomeranian Voivodeship, in north-western Poland. It lies approximately 9 km (6 mi) west of Świdwin and 81 km (50 mi) north-east of the regional capital Szczecin.

The village has a population of 174.
