= Buczyna, West Pomeranian Voivodeship =

Buczyna
- Settlement
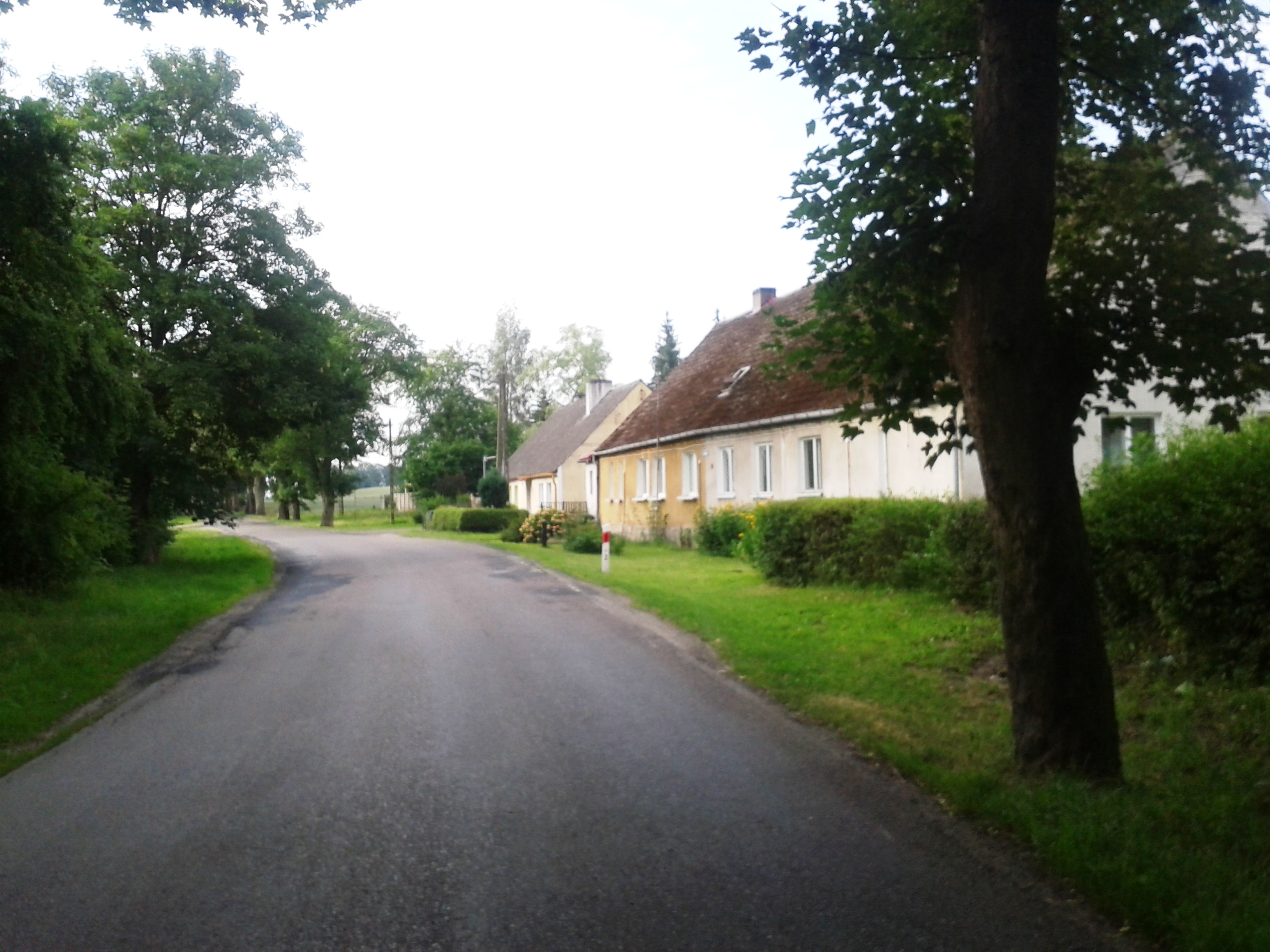
- Buczyna

- Location within Poland
- Coordinates: 53°45′20″N 15°46′11″E
- Country: Poland
- Voivodeship: West Pomeranian
- County: Świdwin
- Gmina: Świdwin

Buczyna [buˈt͡ʂɨna] is a settlement in the administrative district of Gmina Świdwin, within Świdwin County, West Pomeranian Voivodeship, in north-western Poland. It lies approximately 4 km (2 mi) south of Świdwin and 87 km (54 mi) north-east of the regional capital Szczecin.
