= Gola Dolna =

- Settlement
- Location within Poland
- Coordinates: 53°45′6″N 15°43′33″E
- Country: Poland
- Voivodeship: West Pomeranian
- County: Świdwin
- Gmina: Świdwin
- Population: 40

Gola Dolna [ˈɡɔla ˈdɔlna] (German: Nieder Göhle) is a settlement in the administrative district of Gmina Świdwin, within Świdwin County, West Pomeranian Voivodeship, in north-western Poland. It lies approximately 5 km (3 mi) south-west of Świdwin and 85 km (53 mi) north-east of its regional capital Szczecin.
