= Bierzwnica =

- Village
- Location within Poland
- Coordinates: 53°43′N 15°55′E
- Country: Poland
- Voivodeship: West Pomeranian
- County: Świdwin
- Gmina: Świdwin

Bierzwnica [bjɛʐvˈnit͡sa] (German Reinfeld) is a village in the administrative district of Gmina Świdwin, within Świdwin County, West Pomeranian Voivodeship, in north-western Poland. It lies approximately 13 km (8 mi) south-east of Świdwin and 95 km (59 mi) east of the regional capital Szczecin.
