= Bystrzynka =

- Settlement
- Location within Poland
- Coordinates: 53°48′36″N 15°47′40″E
- Country: Poland
- Voivodeship: West Pomeranian
- County: Świdwin
- Gmina: Świdwin

Bystrzynka [bɨsˈtʂɨnka] is a settlement in the administrative district of Gmina Świdwin, within Świdwin County, West Pomeranian Voivodeship, in north-western Poland. It lies approximately 4 km (2 mi) north-east of Świdwin and 92 km (57 mi) north-east of the regional capital Szczecin.
