= Bedlno, West Pomeranian Voivodeship =

Bedlno
- Settlement
- Location within Poland
- Coordinates: 53°46′50″N 15°36′44″E
- Country: Poland
- Voivodeship: West Pomeranian
- County: Świdwin
- Gmina: Świdwin

Bedlno [ˈbɛdlnɔ] is a settlement in the administrative district of Gmina Świdwin, within Świdwin County, West Pomeranian Voivodeship, in north-western Poland. It lies approximately 11 km (7 mi) west of Świdwin and 80 km (50 mi) north-east of the regional capital Szczecin.
