= Gola Górna =

- Village
- Location within Poland
- Coordinates: 53°45′37″N 15°42′52″E
- Country: Poland
- Voivodeship: West Pomeranian
- County: Świdwin
- Gmina: Świdwin
- Population: 43

Gola Górna [ˈɡɔla ˈɡurna] (German: Ober Göhle) is a village in the administrative district of Gmina Świdwin, within Świdwin County, West Pomeranian Voivodeship, in north-western Poland. It lies approximately 5 km (3 mi) south-west of Świdwin and 84 km (52 mi) north-east of the regional capital Szczecin.

The village has a population of 43.
