= Sława, West Pomeranian Voivodeship =

Sława
- Village
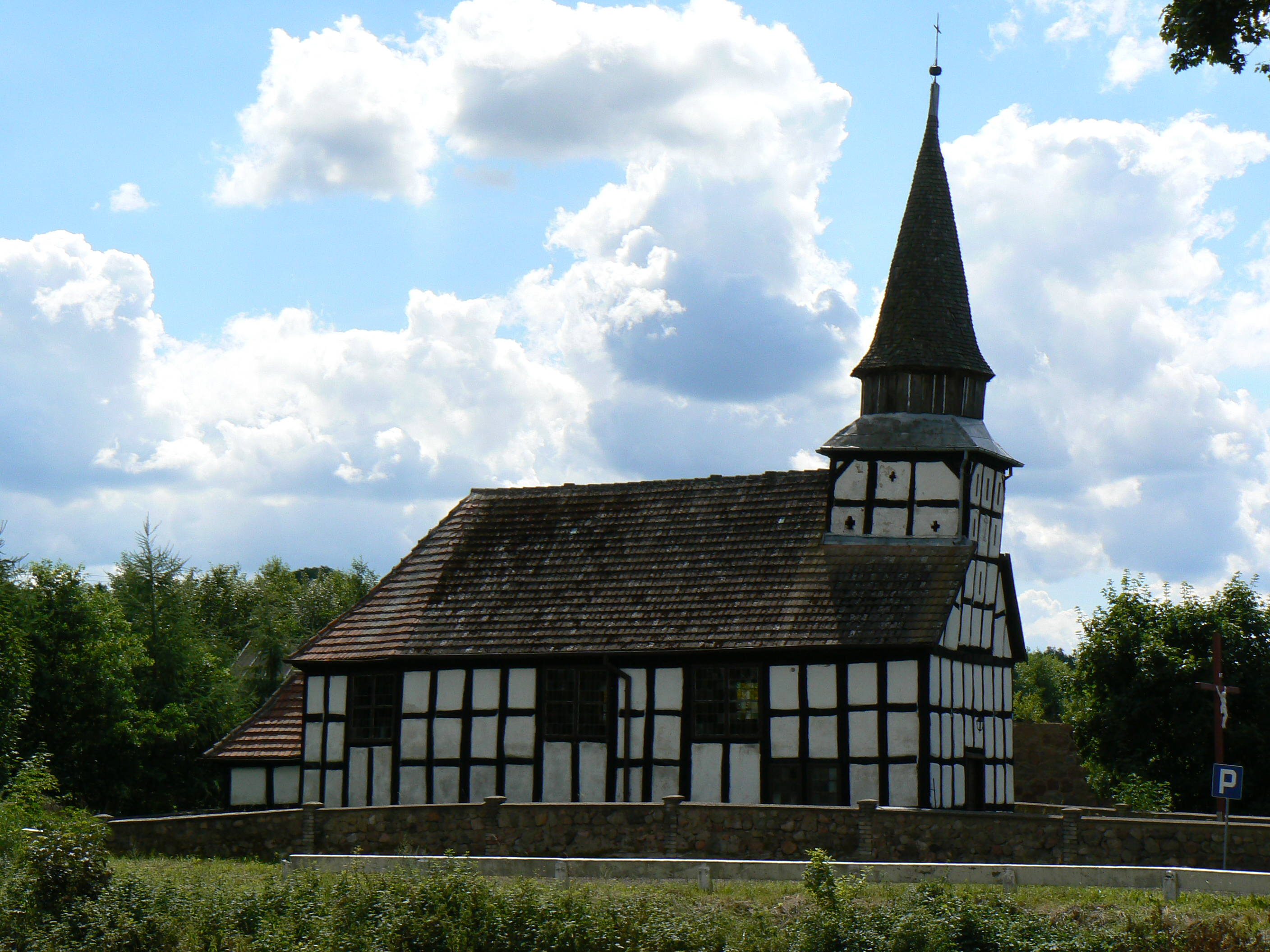
- Our Lady of the Rosary church in Sława

- Location within Poland
- Coordinates: 53°46′N 15°55′E
- Country: Poland
- Voivodeship: West Pomeranian
- County: Świdwin
- Gmina: Świdwin
- Time zone: UTC+1 (CET)
  - Summer (DST): UTC+2 (CEST)
- Vehicle registration: ZSD

Sława [ˈswava] (German: Alt Schlage) is a village in the administrative district of Gmina Świdwin, within Świdwin County, West Pomeranian Voivodeship, in north-western Poland. It lies approximately 11 km (7 mi) east of Świdwin and 97 km (60 mi) north-east of the regional capital Szczecin.
