= Półchleb, Gmina Świdwin =

Półchleb
- Village
- Location within Poland
- Coordinates: 53°44′N 15°44′E
- Country: Poland
- Voivodeship: West Pomeranian
- County: Świdwin
- Gmina: Świdwin

Półchleb [ˈpuu̯xlɛp] (German Polchlep) is a village in the administrative district of Gmina Świdwin, within Świdwin County, West Pomeranian Voivodeship, in north-western Poland. It lies approximately 6 km (4 mi) south of Świdwin and 84 km (52 mi) north-east of the regional capital Szczecin.

For the history of the region, see History of Pomerania.
