= Kleśnica, West Pomeranian Voivodeship =

Kleśnica
- Settlement
- Location within Poland
- Coordinates: 53°46′4″N 15°36′33″E
- Country: Poland
- Voivodeship: West Pomeranian
- County: Świdwin
- Gmina: Świdwin

Kleśnica [klɛɕˈnit͡sa] is a settlement in the administrative district of Gmina Świdwin, within Świdwin County, West Pomeranian Voivodeship, in north-western Poland. It lies approximately 11 km (7 mi) west of Świdwin and 79 km (49 mi) north-east of the regional capital Szczecin.
