= Berkanowo =

- Village
- Location within Poland
- Coordinates: 53°49′N 15°34′E
- Country: Poland
- Voivodeship: West Pomeranian
- County: Świdwin
- Gmina: Świdwin

Berkanowo [bɛrkaˈnɔvɔ] (German: Berkenow) is a village in the administrative district of Gmina Świdwin, within Świdwin County, West Pomeranian Voivodeship, in north-western Poland. It lies approximately 14 km (9 mi) west of Świdwin and 79 km (49 mi) north-east of the regional capital Szczecin.
