= Blizno, West Pomeranian Voivodeship =

Blizno
- Settlement
- Location within Poland
- Coordinates: 53°46′30″N 15°36′28″E
- Country: Poland
- Voivodeship: West Pomeranian
- County: Świdwin
- Gmina: Świdwin

Blizno [ˈbliznɔ] is a settlement in the administrative district of Gmina Świdwin, within Świdwin County, West Pomeranian Voivodeship, in north-western Poland. It lies approximately 11 km (7 mi) west of Świdwin and 79 km (49 mi) north-east of the regional capital Szczecin.
