= Miłobrzegi =

- Settlement
- Location within Poland
- Coordinates: 53°47′33″N 15°45′7″E
- Country: Poland
- Voivodeship: West Pomeranian
- County: Świdwin
- Gmina: Świdwin

Miłobrzegi [miwɔˈbʐɛɡi] (formerly German Friedensburg) is a settlement in the administrative district of Gmina Świdwin, within Świdwin County, West Pomeranian Voivodeship, in north-western Poland. It lies approximately 2 km (1 mi) north-west of Świdwin and 88 km (55 mi) north-east of the regional capital Szczecin.

For the history of the region, see History of Pomerania.
