= Smardzko =

- Village
- Location within Poland
- Coordinates: 53°47′N 15°52′E
- Country: Poland
- Voivodeship: West Pomeranian
- County: Świdwin
- Gmina: Świdwin

Smardzko [ˈsmart͡skɔ] (German Simmatzig) is a village in the administrative district of Gmina Świdwin, within Świdwin County, West Pomeranian Voivodeship, in north-western Poland. It lies approximately 7 km (4 mi) east of Świdwin and 95 km (59 mi) north-east of the regional capital Szczecin.

== See also ==
History of Pomerania
