= Głuszkowo =

- Settlement
- Location within Poland
- Coordinates: 53°50′56″N 15°34′32″E
- Country: Poland
- Voivodeship: West Pomeranian
- County: Świdwin
- Gmina: Świdwin
- Population: 40

Głuszkowo [ɡwuʂˈkɔvɔ] (German Holzkathen) is a settlement in the administrative district of Gmina Świdwin, within Świdwin County, West Pomeranian Voivodeship, in north-western Poland. It lies approximately 15 km (9 mi) north-west of Świdwin and 82 km (51 mi) north-east of the regional capital Szczecin.

The settlement has a population of 40.
