= Ząbrowo, Świdwin County =

Ząbrowo
- Village
- Location within Poland
- Coordinates: 53°50′41″N 15°35′32″E
- Country: Poland
- Voivodeship: West Pomeranian
- County: Świdwin
- Gmina: Świdwin

Ząbrowo [zɔmˈbrɔvɔ] (German: Semerow) is a village in the administrative district of Gmina Świdwin, within Świdwin County, West Pomeranian Voivodeship, in north-western Poland. It lies approximately 14 km (9 mi) north-west of Świdwin and 82 km (51 mi) north-east of the regional capital Szczecin.

== See also ==
History of Pomerania
