= Kluczkowo =

- Village
- Location within Poland
- Coordinates: 53°44′46″N 15°51′52″E
- Country: Poland
- Voivodeship: West Pomeranian
- County: Świdwin
- Gmina: Świdwin
- Elevation: 110 m (360 ft)
- Population: 214

Kluczkowo [klut͡ʂˈkɔvɔ] (German Klützkow) is a village in the administrative district of Gmina Świdwin, within Świdwin County, West Pomeranian Voivodeship, in north-western Poland. It lies approximately 8 km (5 mi) south-east of Świdwin and 93 km (58 mi) north-east of the regional capital Szczecin.

For the history of the region, see History of Pomerania.

The village has a population of 213.
