= Słowieńsko, Świdwin County =

Słowieńsko
- Village
- Location within Poland
- Coordinates: 53°51′N 15°38′E
- Country: Poland
- Voivodeship: West Pomeranian
- County: Świdwin
- Gmina: Sławoborze
- Population: 320

Słowieńsko [swɔˈvjɛɲskɔ] (German: Schlenzig) is a village in the administrative district of Gmina Sławoborze, within Świdwin County, West Pomeranian Voivodeship, in north-western Poland. It lies approximately 7 km (4 mi) south-west of Sławoborze, 12 km (7 mi) north-west of Świdwin, and 85 km (53 mi) north-east of the regional capital Szczecin.

The village has a population of 320.
