= Przybyradz, Świdwin County =

Przybyradz
- Settlement
- Location within Poland
- Coordinates: 53°45′49″N 15°36′48″E
- Country: Poland
- Voivodeship: West Pomeranian
- County: Świdwin
- Gmina: Świdwin

Przybyradz [pʂɨˈbɨrat͡s] (formerly German Bullenberg) is a settlement in the administrative district of Gmina Świdwin, within Świdwin County, West Pomeranian Voivodeship, in north-western Poland. It lies approximately 11 km (7 mi) west of Świdwin and 79 km (49 mi) north-east of the regional capital Szczecin.

For the history of the region, see History of Pomerania.
