= Oparzno =

- Village
- Location within Poland
- Coordinates: 53°46′N 15°42′E
- Country: Poland
- Voivodeship: West Pomeranian
- County: Świdwin
- Gmina: Świdwin

Oparzno [ɔˈpaʐnɔ] (German Wopersnow) is a village in the administrative district of Gmina Świdwin, within Świdwin County, West Pomeranian Voivodeship, in north-western Poland. It lies approximately 5 km (3 mi) south-west of Świdwin and 84 km (52 mi) north-east of the regional capital Szczecin.

For the history of the region, see History of Pomerania.
