= Słowieńsko =

Słowieńsko may refer to the following places in Poland:

- Słowieńsko, Świdwin County
- Słowieńsko, Szczecin
