= Modrzewiec =

- Village
- Location within Poland
- Coordinates: 53°49′27″N 15°55′42″E
- Country: Poland
- Voivodeship: West Pomeranian
- County: Świdwin
- Gmina: Rąbino
- Population: 180

Modrzewiec (Polish: [mɔdˈʐɛvjɛt͡s]; German: Heyde) is a village in the administrative district of Gmina Rąbino, within Świdwin County, West Pomeranian Voivodeship, in north-western Poland. It lies approximately 5 km (3 mi) south of Rąbino, 12 km (7 mi) north-east of Świdwin, and 100 km (62 mi) north-east of the regional capital Szczecin.

For the history of the region, see History of Pomerania.

The village has a population of 180.
