= Osowo, Świdwin County =

Osowo
- Village
- Location within Poland
- Coordinates: 53°45′53″N 15°38′20″E
- Country: Poland
- Voivodeship: West Pomeranian
- County: Świdwin
- Gmina: Świdwin
- Population: 50

Osowo [ɔˈsɔvɔ] (German Wussow) is a village in the administrative district of Gmina Świdwin, within Świdwin County, West Pomeranian Voivodeship, in north-western Poland. It lies approximately 9 km (6 mi) west of Świdwin and 80 km (50 mi) north-east of the regional capital Szczecin.

For the history of the region, see History of Pomerania.

The village has a population of 50.
