= Kowanowo, West Pomeranian Voivodeship =

Kowanowo
- Village
- Location within Poland
- Coordinates: 53°48′16″N 15°36′18″E
- Country: Poland
- Voivodeship: West Pomeranian
- County: Świdwin
- Gmina: Świdwin
- Population: 40

Kowanowo [kɔvaˈnɔvɔ] (formerly German Schönfeld) is a village in the administrative district of Gmina Świdwin, within Świdwin County, West Pomeranian Voivodeship, in north-western Poland. It lies approximately 11 km (7 mi) west of Świdwin and 81 km (50 mi) north-east of the regional capital Szczecin.

For the history of the region, see History of Pomerania.

The village has a population of 40.
