= Jezierzyce =

Jezierzyce may refer to the following places:

- Jezierzyce, Greater Poland Voivodeship (west-central Poland)
- Jezierzyce, Pomeranian Voivodeship (north Poland)
- Jezierzyce, Warmian-Masurian Voivodeship (north Poland)
- Jezierzyce, Myślibórz County in West Pomeranian Voivodeship (north-west Poland)
- Jezierzyce, Świdwin County in West Pomeranian Voivodeship (north-west Poland)
- Jezierzyce, Szczecin
