= Przymiarki, Świdwin County =

Przymiarki
- Settlement
- Location within Poland
- Coordinates: 53°50′N 15°46′E
- Country: Poland
- Voivodeship: West Pomeranian
- County: Świdwin
- Gmina: Świdwin

Przymiarki [pʂɨˈmjarki] (formerly German Ankerholz) is a settlement in the administrative district of Gmina Świdwin, within Świdwin County, West Pomeranian Voivodeship, in north-western Poland. It lies approximately 6 km (4 mi) north of Świdwin and 91 km (57 mi) north-east of the regional capital Szczecin.

For the history of the region, see History of Pomerania.
