= Kołatka =

Kołatka may refer to the following places:

- Kołatka, Lubusz Voivodeship (west Poland)
- Kołatka, Drawsko County in West Pomeranian Voivodeship (north-west Poland)
- Kołatka, Świdwin County in West Pomeranian Voivodeship (north-west Poland)
