= Gmina Rąbino =

Gmina Rąbino Rąbino Commune
- Gmina
- Coat of arms
- Interactive map of Gmina Rąbino
- Coordinates (Rąbino): 53°51′58″N 15°56′34″E
- Country: Poland
- Voivodeship: West Pomeranian
- County: Świdwin
- Seat: Rąbino

Area
  - Total: 180.00 km^{2} (69.50 sq mi)

Population (2006)
  - Total: 3,935
  - Density: 21.86/km^{2} (56.62/sq mi)

Gmina Rąbino is a rural gmina (administrative district) in Świdwin County, West Pomeranian Voivodeship, in north-western Poland. Its seat is the village of Rąbino, which lies approximately 15 kilometres (9 mi) north-east of Świdwin and 103 km (64 mi) north-east of the regional capital Szczecin. The gmina covers an area of 180.00 square kilometres (69.5 sq mi). As of 2006, its total population is 3,935.

== Villages ==
Gmina Rąbino contains the villages and settlements of Batyń, Biała Góra, Biernów, Dąbrowa Białogardzka, Dąbrówka, Dołganów, Gąsków, Głodzino, Gręzino, Jezierzyce, Kłodzino, Kołatka, Lipie, Liskowo, Modrzewiec, Niebórz, Nielep, Paszęcin, Polakowo, Rąbinko, Rąbino, Racimierz, Role, Rzecino, Stare Ludzicko, Świerznica and Zbytki.

== Neighbouring gminas ==
Gmina Rąbino is bordered by the gminas of Białogard, Połczyn-Zdrój, Sławoborze and Świdwin.
