= Lekowo, West Pomeranian Voivodeship =

Lekowo
- Village
- Location within Poland
- Coordinates: 53°49′6″N 15°40′44″E
- Country: Poland
- Voivodeship: West Pomeranian
- County: Świdwin
- Gmina: Świdwin

Lekowo [lɛˈkɔvɔ] (German Leckow) is a village in the administrative district of Gmina Świdwin, within Świdwin County, West Pomeranian Voivodeship, in north-western Poland. It lies approximately 7 km (4 mi) north-west of Świdwin and 85 km (53 mi) north-east of the regional capital Szczecin.

For the history of the region, see History of Pomerania.
