= Rogalinko =

- Settlement
- Location within Poland
- Coordinates: 53°48′47″N 15°52′24″E
- Country: Poland
- Voivodeship: West Pomeranian
- County: Świdwin
- Gmina: Świdwin

Rogalinko [rɔɡaˈlinkɔ] (German: Schäferei) is a settlement in the administrative district of Gmina Świdwin, within Świdwin County, West Pomeranian Voivodeship, in north-western Poland. It lies approximately 8 km (5 mi) north-east of Świdwin and 96 km (60 mi) north-east of the regional capital Szczecin.

For the history of the region, see History of Pomerania.
