= Krasna, West Pomeranian Voivodeship =

Krasna
- Settlement
- Location within Poland
- Coordinates: 53°42′23″N 15°55′24″E
- Country: Poland
- Voivodeship: West Pomeranian
- County: Świdwin
- Gmina: Świdwin

Krasna [ˈkrasna] (formerly German Fischersruh) is a settlement in the administrative district of Gmina Świdwin, within Świdwin County, West Pomeranian Voivodeship, in north-western Poland. It lies approximately 14 km (9 mi) south-east of Świdwin and 95 km (59 mi) east of the regional capital Szczecin.

For the history of the region, see History of Pomerania.
