= Łąkowo =

- Village
- Location within Poland
- Coordinates: 53°45′39″N 15°40′26″E
- Country: Poland
- Voivodeship: West Pomeranian
- County: Świdwin
- Gmina: Świdwin

Łąkowo [wɔŋˈkɔvɔ] (formerly German Lankow) is a village in the administrative district of Gmina Świdwin, within Świdwin County, West Pomeranian Voivodeship, in north-western Poland. It lies approximately 8 km (5 mi) south-west of Świdwin and 81 km (50 mi) north-east of the regional capital Szczecin.

For the history of the region, see History of Pomerania.
