= Cieszyno =

Cieszyno may refer to the following places:

- Cieszyno, Drawsko County in West Pomeranian Voivodeship (north-west Poland)
- Cieszyno, Łobez County in West Pomeranian Voivodeship (north-west Poland)
- Cieszyno, Świdwin County in West Pomeranian Voivodeship (north-west Poland)
