= Psary, West Pomeranian Voivodeship =

Psary
- Settlement
- Location within Poland
- Coordinates: 53°45′29″N 15°49′39″E
- Country: Poland
- Voivodeship: West Pomeranian
- County: Świdwin
- Gmina: Świdwin

Psary [ˈpsarɨ] (formerly German Stadthof) is a settlement in the administrative district of Gmina Świdwin, within Świdwin County, West Pomeranian Voivodeship, in north-western Poland. It lies approximately 5 km (3 mi) south-east of Świdwin and 91 km (57 mi) north-east of the regional capital Szczecin.

For the history of the region, see History of Pomerania.
