= Miedzno, West Pomeranian Voivodeship =

Miedzno
- Village
- Location within Poland
- Coordinates: 53°49′50″N 15°46′47″E
- Country: Poland
- Voivodeship: West Pomeranian
- County: Świdwin
- Gmina: Sławoborze

Miedzno [ˈmjɛd͡znɔ] (German: Niederhof) is a village in the administrative district of Gmina Sławoborze, within Świdwin County, West Pomeranian Voivodeship, in north-western Poland.

For the history of the region, see History of Pomerania.
