= Kluczkówko =

- Settlement
- Location within Poland
- Coordinates: 53°44′51″N 15°52′51″E
- Country: Poland
- Voivodeship: West Pomeranian
- County: Świdwin
- Gmina: Świdwin

Kluczkówko [klut͡ʂˈkufkɔ] (formerly German Klützkower Mühle) is a settlement in the administrative district of Gmina Świdwin, within Świdwin County, West Pomeranian Voivodeship, in north-western Poland.

For the history of the region, see History of Pomerania.
