= Nowy Przybysław =

- Settlement
- Location within Poland
- Coordinates: 53°46′15″N 15°44′54″E
- Country: Poland
- Voivodeship: West Pomeranian
- County: Świdwin
- Gmina: Świdwin

Nowy Przybysław [ˈnɔvɨ pʂɨˈbɨswaf] (formerly German Neu Pribslaff) is a settlement in the administrative district of Gmina Świdwin, within Świdwin County, West Pomeranian Voivodeship, in north-western Poland. It lies approximately 2 km (1 mi) south-west of Świdwin and 87 km (54 mi) north-east of the regional capital Szczecin.

For the history of the region, see History of Pomerania.
