= Niebórz =

- Settlement
- Location within Poland
- Coordinates: 53°50′59″N 15°52′40″E
- Country: Poland
- Voivodeship: West Pomeranian
- County: Świdwin
- Gmina: Rąbino

Niebórz [ˈɲɛbuʂ] is a settlement in the administrative district of Gmina Rąbino, within Świdwin County, West Pomeranian Voivodeship, in north-western Poland.

For the history of the region, see History of Pomerania.
