= Stary Przybysław =

- Village
- Location within Poland
- Coordinates: 53°46′30″N 15°44′32″E
- Country: Poland
- Voivodeship: West Pomeranian
- County: Świdwin
- Gmina: Świdwin
- Population: 259

Stary Przybysław [ˈstarɨ pʂɨˈbɨswaf] (German: Pribslaff) is a village in the administrative district of Gmina Świdwin, within Świdwin County, West Pomeranian Voivodeship, in north-western Poland. It lies approximately 2 km (1 mi) south-west of Świdwin and 87 km (54 mi) north-east of the regional capital Szczecin.

The village has a population of 259.

== See also ==
History of Pomerania
