= Świerznica, West Pomeranian Voivodeship =

Świerznica
- Village
- Location within Poland
- Coordinates: 53°52′00″N 16°00′00″E
- Country: Poland
- Voivodeship: West Pomeranian
- County: Świdwin
- Gmina: Rąbino

Świerznica (Polish: [ɕfjɛʐˈɲit͡sa]; German: Zwirnitz) is a village in the administrative district of Gmina Rąbino, within Świdwin County, West Pomeranian Voivodeship, in north-western Poland.

For the history of the region, see History of Pomerania.
