= Świdwinek =

- Village
- Location within Poland
- Coordinates: 53°46′09″N 15°49′13″E
- Country: Poland
- Voivodeship: West Pomeranian
- County: Świdwin
- Gmina: Świdwin

Świdwinek [ɕfidˈvinɛk] (German Neu Schivelbein) is a village in the administrative district of Gmina Świdwin, within Świdwin County, West Pomeranian Voivodeship, in north-western Poland.
