= Otto Georg Bogislaf von Glasenapp =

German banker (1853–1928)

Otto Georg Bogislaf von Glasenapp (30 September 1853 in Schivelbein – 3 March 1928 in Berlin) was vice-president of the Reichsbank.

== Distinctions ==
- Roter Adlerorden III. Klasse mit Schlaufe
- Russischer Sankt Stanislaus Orden II. Klasse mit Stern
- Ehrenbürger der Stadt Schivelbein
