= Cieszyno, Świdwin County =

Cieszyno
- Village
- Location within Poland
- Coordinates: 53°48′N 15°43′E
- Country: Poland
- Voivodeship: West Pomeranian
- County: Świdwin
- Gmina: Świdwin

Cieszyno [t͡ɕɛˈʂɨnɔ] (German: Teschenbusch) is a village in the administrative district of Gmina Świdwin, within Świdwin County, West Pomeranian Voivodeship, in north-western Poland. It lies approximately 4 km (2 mi) north-west of Świdwin and 87 km (54 mi) north-east of the regional capital Szczecin.
