= Dialog+ =

Psychological intervention

DIALOG+ is a technology-supported intervention used to structure communication between a patient and a mental health care provider. The intervention consists of the patient providing ratings of their subjective quality of life (SQOL) on 11 areas of the DIALOG scale (made up of eight life domains and three treatment aspects). The eight life domains consist of: mental health, physical health, job situation, accommodation, leisure activities, relationships with partner/family, friendships and personal safety. The three treatment aspects deal with medication, practical help and meetings with mental health professionals. The 11 items together make up the DIALOG scale.

On all areas, the patient is asked to rate how satisfied they are on a 7-point scale that ranges from (1) "totally dissatisfied", to (7) "totally satisfied".

Each DIALOG+ session starts with the patient rating their satisfaction on the DIALOG scale. The intervention is hosted on a device that supports the technology, meaning that the patient is more actively involved in the meeting. In the case of face-to-face delivery, a tablet computer can be used to allow for the device to be passed easily between the patient and the provider to aid discussion. The scores are summarised and can easily be compared on the screen, and, if this is a subsequent visit, be compared to scores provided at earlier visits. This gives a rapid overview of the current problems and strengths in the patient's life. As part of the intervention, providers are encouraged to provide positive feedback on highly rated domains or, at subsequent visits, any domains that have shown improvement over previous sessions. After this, the patient selects up to three areas, depending on time available, for further discussion on areas where more help is needed.

Discussion of the area is facilitated by a four-step approach, based on principles of solution focused therapy. The four step approach includes: (1) Understanding, intended to allow the clinician and the patient to understand the patient's situation by assessing why the rating is the one given and, for example, not lower and discussing what is working, (2) Looking forward, where the patient adopts a future perspective and is encouraged to imagine what changes (best case scenario and smallest improvement) they would like to see to their current situation, (3) Exploring options, consider what practical actions might lead to the desired change, this includes looking at things that the patient, the clinician and others can do, and (4) Agreeing on actions, where the clinician and patient agree specific actions that are documented for review at the next session. These actions can be used to make up a tailored care plan for the individual.

The full DIALOG+ intervention builds on the DIALOG Scale, and is supported by mobile application available on Android and Apple operating systems as well as a Progressive Web Application which can be used on any device that has a web browser. The intervention draws on quality-of-life research, patient-centered communication, and principles of solution-focused therapy. It was developed to ensure that patient-clinician communication effectively facilitates and promotes positive change, and time routinely used is clinically effective.

== Using DIALOG Scale data ==
Each of the 11 items on the DIALOG scale is its own individual subscale, meaning every item is meaningful and can be interpreted, not just the mean score of items. The mean average of the eight quality of life domains items can be used as a global measure of SQOL, and the mean of the three treatment aspects can be used as a treatment satisfaction measure. In terms of evaluating treatment, changes in SQOL over time are usually assessed using a paired score, a baseline score established at intake or at the beginning of any new treatment episode, compared to a score at the end of treatment or at discharge. For longer term treatments, interim scores may be obtained monthly, or six monthly, or as appropriate and determined by the nature and duration of treatment. The DIALOG scale and analytical plan are publicly available for use. Although the scale was designed to be used as a therapeutic intervention by structuring communication, it can also be used to measure outcome data on SQOL and treatment satisfaction, with established psychometric properties. And each item of the scale can be used to evaluate treatment on the level of individuals, groups and services. The DIALOG scale is one of three outcome measures recommended nationally in early intervention in psychosis programmes in the NHS.

Fidelity of delivery of the intervention is assessed using the DIALOG+ Adherence Scale.

== Development ==
Both the DIALOG Scale and DIALOG+ intervention were developed at the Unit for Social and Community Psychiatry, a WHO Collaborating Centre for Mental Health Service Development, at Queen Mary University of London and the East London NHS Foundation Trust (ELFT). This development and research was led by Professor Stefan Priebe, supported by funding from the European Commission and the National Institute for Health and Care Research (NIHR), UK.

They were developed to explore how to structure communication between mental health patients and health providers. In the early version of DIALOG+ (known as the DIALOG scale), patients rated their satisfaction and healthcare needs across 11 different parts of their life and treatment. The ratings were then used to guide conversations between patients and health providers to identify patient priorities.

The original DIALOG scale was further expanded to include a therapeutic intervention to address priorities identified by the patients through the use of the DIALOG scale. The new intervention, called DIALOG+, incorporated an additional 4-step approach where the patient and health provider worked together to suggest solutions for the concerns raised during completion of the DIALOG scale.

== Clinical use ==
Both DIALOG and DIALOG+ have been implemented across the National Health Service (NHS) in the UK, including Oxleas NHS Foundation Trust, South London and Maudsley NHS Foundation Trust, and East London NHS Foundation Trust (ELFT). Within ELFT, DIALOG+ has replaced part of the Care Programme Approach which provides mental health assessments as part of a patient's recovery plan and safety plan. In 2022, DIALOG+ was integrated into all community adult mental health services in all London boroughs and Milton Keynes.

== Research Evidence ==
The DIALOG Scale and DIALOG+ are supported by peer reviewed publications.

DIALOG Scale

The psychometric properties of the DIALOG scale have been found to be sound as measures of subjective quality of life (SQOL), meaning that DIALOG alone could be used as a therapeutic intervention, but also as an acceptable measure of SQOL. More data supporting the use of DIALOG in the NHS comes from the East London Foundation Trust, where it has been used since 2017, as a measure of SQOL has been published. In a cluster randomised controlled trial in six countries (Spain, The Netherlands, UK, Sweden, Germany and Switzerland) DIALOG, supported by a desktop computer, was found to improve SQOL in patients and led to fewer unmet needs and higher treatment satisfaction, assessed after 12 months.

DIALOG+

Based on this promising DIALOG data, DIALOG+ was developed and manualised, using new software on tablet computers, to structure the discussion around the delivery and four step process describe above to provide a way of addressing any issues identified during the discussion. In a subsequent pragmatic cluster-randomised trial in London, UK, DIALOG+ was shown to improve patient SQOL at 3, 6 and 12 months, reduce psychopathological symptoms and also improved objective social outcomes, whilst reducing the cost of treatment.

A study to explore the mechanisms by which DIALOG+ led to these improvements determined that DIALOG+ was likely to be effective because it provides a comprehensive, solution-focused structure to the routine meetings, whilst encouraging self-reflection and expression and empowerment in patients. A pilot study conducted in Germany describes the implementation of a German version of DIALOG+. DIALOG+ has also been tested in research studies in Bosnia and Herzegovina, Colombia, Uganda, Peru, Argentina, Pakistan, Serbia, Kosovo UN Resolution, Montenegro, North Macedonia, and is being tested in Pakistan and India. A study in schools in Colombia developed and tested an adapted version for use with scholars.
