= Dobrowola, West Pomeranian Voivodeship =

Dobrowola
- Settlement
- Location within Poland
- Coordinates: 53°49′19″N 15°47′26″E
- Country: Poland
- Voivodeship: West Pomeranian
- County: Świdwin
- Gmina: Świdwin

Dobrowola [dɔbrɔˈvɔla] is a settlement in the administrative district of Gmina Świdwin, within Świdwin County, West Pomeranian Voivodeship, in north-western Poland.
