= Gmina Świdwin =

Gmina Świdwin Świdwin Commune
- Gmina
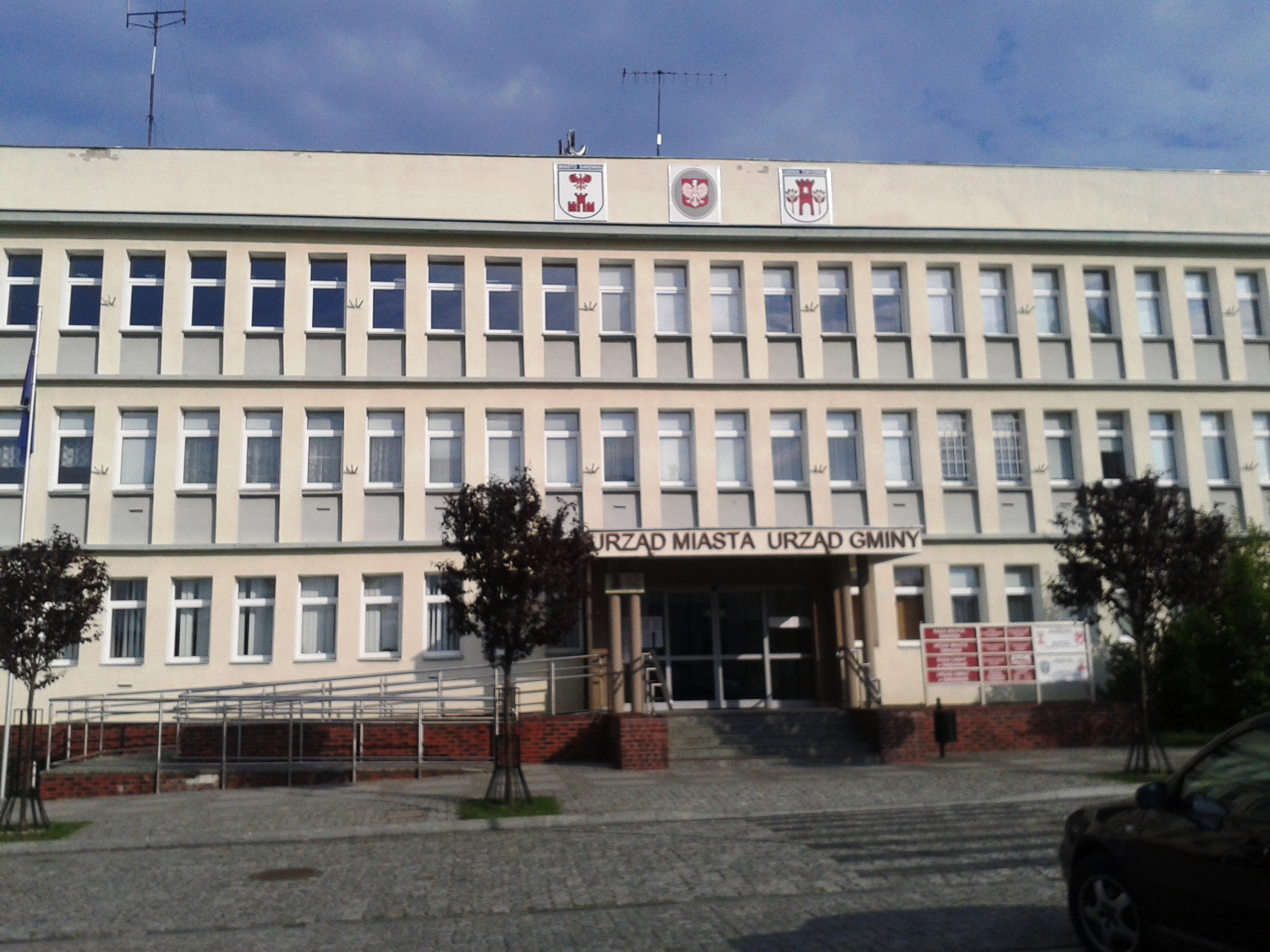
- Gmina office in Świdwin

- Flag Coat of arms
- Interactive map of Gmina Świdwin
- Coordinates (Świdwin): 53°47′N 15°46′E
- Country: Poland
- Voivodeship: West Pomeranian
- County: Świdwin
- Seat: Świdwin

Area
  - Total: 247.34 km^{2} (95.50 sq mi)

Population (2006)
  - Total: 6,202
  - Density: 25.07/km^{2} (64.94/sq mi)
- Time zone: UTC+1 (CET)
  - Summer (DST): UTC+2 (CEST)
- Vehicle registration: ZSD
- Website: http://www.swidwin.gmina.pl/

Gmina Świdwin is a rural gmina (administrative district) in Świdwin County, West Pomeranian Voivodeship, in north-western Poland. Its seat is the town of Świdwin, although the town is not part of the territory of the gmina.

The gmina covers an area of 247.34 square kilometres (95.5 sq mi). As of 2006, its total population is 6,202.

== Villages ==
Gmina Świdwin contains the villages and settlements of Bedlno, Bełtno, Berkanowo, Bierzwnica, Blizno, Buczyna, Bystrzyna, Bystrzynka, Cieszeniewo, Cieszyno, Czarnolesie, Dobrowola, Głuszkowo, Gola Dolna, Gola Górna, Karpno, Kartlewo, Kawczyno, Klępczewo, Kleśnica, Kłośniki, Kluczkówko, Kluczkowo, Kowanowo, Krasna, Krosino, Kunowo, Łąkowo, Lekowo, Lipce, Miłobrzegi, Niemierzyno, Nowy Przybysław, Oparzno, Osowo, Półchleb, Przybyradz, Przymiarki, Psary, Rogalinko, Rogalino, Rusinowo, Rycerzewko, Sława, Śliwno, Smardzko, Stary Przybysław, Świdwinek and Ząbrowo.

== Neighbouring gminas ==
Gmina Świdwin is bordered by the town of Świdwin and by the gminas of Brzeżno, Łobez, Ostrowice, Połczyn-Zdrój, Rąbino, Resko and Sławoborze.
