= Sławkowo, West Pomeranian Voivodeship =

Sławkowo
- Village
- Location within Poland
- Coordinates: 53°51′55″N 15°42′05″E
- Country: Poland
- Voivodeship: West Pomeranian
- County: Świdwin
- Gmina: Sławoborze

Sławkowo [swafˈkɔvɔ] (German: Henriettenhof) is a village in the administrative district of Gmina Sławoborze, within Świdwin County, West Pomeranian Voivodeship, in north-western Poland.
