= Hasan Enver Pasha =

Ottoman military officer

- Born: 1857; Istanbul, Ottoman Empire
- Died: 1929 (aged 71–72); Istanbul, Turkey
- Military career
- Allegiance: Ottoman Empire
- Service years: 1876–1908
- Rank: Mirliva
- Conflicts: Greco-Turkish War (1897)
- Other work: Writer, educator

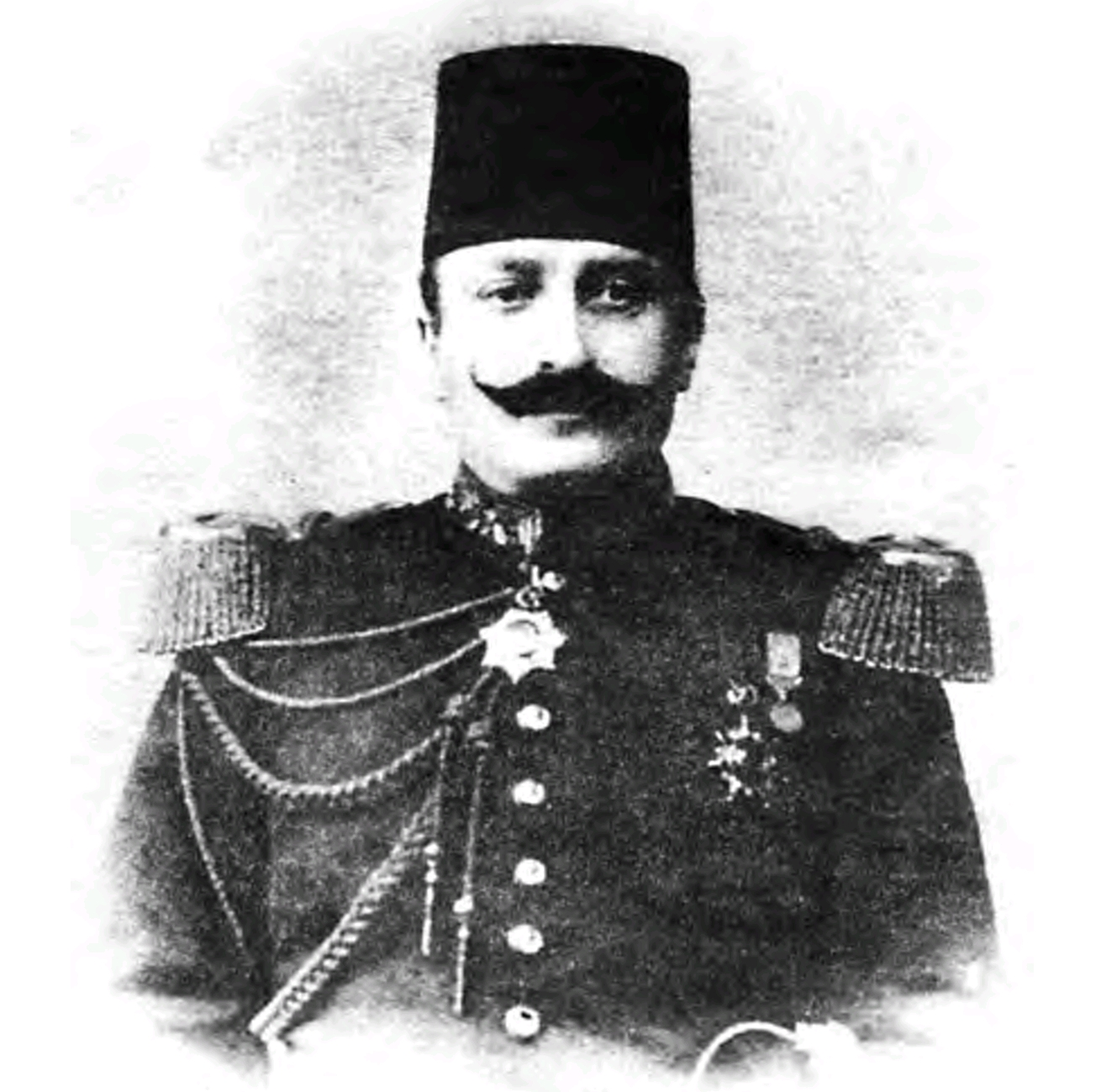
Portrait of Hasan Enver Pasha, circa 1890s

Hasan Enver Pasha, (Turkish: Hasan Enver Paşa; 1857, Istanbul – 1929, Istanbul) was an Ottoman Turkish general.

== Personal life ==
He was the son of Mustafa Celalettin Pasha a Polish convert to Islam, who fled to the Ottoman Empire after a failed Polish uprising against Prussia, who joined the Ottoman army under the name "Mustafa Celaleddin". His mother was the daughter of Omer Pasha.

After graduating from Galatasaray High School he studied engineering in Paris.

He married Leyla Hanım, a daughter of Mehmed Ali Pasha (marshal). They had five children: Celile who became the mother of Nâzım Hikmet, Münevver who became the mother of Oktay Rıfat Horozcu, Mustafa Celalettin, Mehmet Ali, and Sara.

== Military Life ==
After graduating the Turkish Military Academy, he became an Ottoman officer like his father. His first assignment was as an attaché for Austria. He became the commander of the unit stationed at Volos, after the capture of the city in 1897. He was sent to observe the Cuban War of Independence in 1898, it is said that was to gain experience to use in the similar position in Crete at the time. In 1901, he led an expedition to deliver Islamic and pan-Islamic messages to the Muslims of China who interfered in the Boxer Rebellion.

== Later life and works ==
After retiring, he founded a school in Erenköy. He also wrote articles on Turkish history for a magazine. A book on Havana was partially based on his experiences. He died in 1929 at Istanbul.
