= Karpno, Świdwin County =

Karpno
- Settlement
- Location within Poland
- Coordinates: 53°46′57″N 15°36′59″E
- Country: Poland
- Voivodeship: West Pomeranian
- County: Świdwin
- Gmina: Świdwin

Karpno [ˈkarpnɔ] (German Kolanushof) is a settlement in the administrative district of Gmina Świdwin, within Świdwin County, West Pomeranian Voivodeship, in north-western Poland. It lies approximately 10 km (6 mi) west of Świdwin and 80 km (50 mi) north-east of the regional capital Szczecin.
