= Niemierzyno, Gmina Świdwin =

Niemierzyno
- Village
- Location within Poland
- Coordinates: 53°48′00″N 15°50′00″E
- Country: Poland
- Voivodeship: West Pomeranian
- County: Świdwin
- Gmina: Świdwin
- Population: 154

Niemierzyno [ɲɛmjɛˈʐɨnɔ] (German Nemmin) is a village in the administrative district of Gmina Świdwin, within Świdwin County, West Pomeranian Voivodeship, in north-western Poland.

For the history of the region, see History of Pomerania.

In 2008, the village had a population of 154.
