= Pomorce =

- Village
- Location within Poland
- Coordinates: 53°52′06″N 15°34′50″E
- Country: Poland
- Voivodeship: West Pomeranian
- County: Świdwin
- Gmina: Sławoborze

Pomorce [pɔˈmɔrt͡sɛ] (German: Pommerscher Hof) is a village in the administrative district of Gmina Sławoborze, within Świdwin County, West Pomeranian Voivodeship, in north-western Poland.

For the history of the region, see History of Pomerania.
