= Pribislav =

Pribislav, Przibislaus is a Slavic given name. Its feminine form is Pribislava.

Notable bearers of the name include:

- Pribislaw I, Lord of Parchim-Richenberg
- Pribislaw II, son of the above, Lord of Białogard
- Pribislav (Hevelli prince) (1075–1150), also known as Pribislav-Henry
- Pribislav (Wagrian prince) (died after 1156), Obotrite prince
- Pribislav of Mecklenburg (died 1178), Obotrite prince and first Prince of Mecklenburg
- Pribislav of Serbia (ruled 891–892), Prince of the Serbs

== See also ==
- Przybysław (disambiguation)
- Přibyslav (Havlíčkův Brod District), a town in Czech Republic
- Přibyslav (Náchod District), a municipality and village in Czech Republic
- Pribislavec, a village in Croatia
