= Novosela =

Novosela Новосела
- Village
- Location within Vologda Oblast Location within Russia
- Coordinates: 59°03′N 37°56′E
- Country: Russia
- Region: Vologda Oblast
- District: Cherepovetsky District
- Time zone: UTC+3:00

Novosela (Russian: Новосела) is a rural locality (a village) in Yugskoye Rural Settlement, Cherepovetsky District, Vologda Oblast, Russia. The population was 3 as of 2002.

== Geography ==
Novosela is located 9 km (5.6 mi) south of Cherepovets (the district's administrative centre) by road. Poluyevo is the nearest rural locality.
