= Stefan Priebe =

Psychologist and psychiatrist

- Born: 1953 (age 72–73); West Berlin
- Citizenship: German, British
- Education: University of Hamburg; Free University of Berlin
- Scientific career
- Workplaces: Queen Mary University of London
- Website: stefanpriebe.com

Stefan Priebe (born 1953 in West-Berlin) is a German-British psychologist and psychiatrist.

== Early life ==
Priebe grew up in West Berlin, completed school at the Canisius-Kolleg and studied psychology and medicine at the University of Hamburg. He later qualified as psychiatrist, neurologist and psychotherapist in Berlin, where he trained and worked at the Free University Berlin.

== Career ==
Priebe was Head of the Department of Social Psychiatry at the Free University Berlin until 1997, when he became Professor of Social and Community Psychiatry at Queen Mary, University of London and the head of the Unit for Social and Community Psychiatry based in the London Borough of Newham. The unit was designated a World Health Organization Collaborating Centre in 2012. Priebe retired in May 2023 and is now an Honorary Visiting Professor at City, University of London and adjunct professor at the Medical University of Vienna. In July 2024, he became Senior Professor for Public Mental Health in the Centre for Psychosocial Medicine at the University of Hamburg.

== Research ==
He has authored and co-authored over 800 peer-reviewed scientific papers.

=== Mental consequences of political persecution and war ===
After the re-unification of Germany in 1989, he studied mental consequences of political persecution in East Germany. The findings were cited in the German legislation for compensating the victims of political imprisonment. Later, he led studies that described lasting mental disorders in survivors of the wars in the Balkans, both refugees and those who stayed in the conflict zone, particularly in those who had experienced human rights violations.

=== Assessing views and experiences of psychiatric patients ===
Priebe investigated the treatment experiences of patients with mental disorders and authored several scales for assessing their views and appraisals. These scales include the Manchester Short Assessment for Quality of Life, Clients Assessment of Treatment Scale, the Helping Alliance Scale, and the Scale for Assessing Therapeutic Relationships in Community Mental Health Care.

=== Advancing psycho-social treatment (DIALOG+) ===
He led on randomised controlled trials testing psycho-social interventions in mental health care, e.g. body psychotherapy, music therapy, dialectical behaviour therapy, financial incentives to improve medication adherence, and befriending through volunteers. In particular, he developed DIALOG+, which aims to make routine patient-clinician meetings therapeutically effective.

=== Global mental health ===
Some of Priebe's research focuses on global mental health. Between 2017-2022, Priebe was the Director of the Global Health Research Group on Developing Psychosocial Interventions for Mental Health Care, funded by the National Institute for Health Research in the United Kingdom. The Group conducted studies in Argentina, Bosnia-Herzegovina, Colombia, Pakistan, Peru and Uganda.

Since 2019, he has been leading a research programme funded by the Medical Research Council that assesses how young people in Bogotá, Lima and Buenos Aires overcome episodes of mental distress. Partners in the programme are Javeriana Universidad in Bogotá, the Universidad de Buenos Aires, the Universidad Peruana Cayetano Heredia in Lima and the arts organisations Fundación Batuta (Bogotá), Crear Vale La Pena (Buenos Aires) and Teatro a Plaza (Lima).

=== Conceptual work ===
Since 2010, Priebe has published and lectured on a social paradigm in psychiatry, which regards mental disorders as a social phenomenon and focuses on social interactions in society and in treatments for reducing mental distress.
