= Karpno, Bytów County =

Karpno
- Village
- Location within Poland
- Coordinates: 53°57′N 17°26′E
- Country: Poland
- Voivodeship: Pomeranian
- County: Bytów
- Gmina: Lipnica
- Population: 82

Karpno [ˈkarpnɔ] is a village in the administrative district of Gmina Lipnica, within Bytów County, Pomeranian Voivodeship, in northern Poland.

Klaklewo is part of the village.

For details of the history of the region, see History of Pomerania.
