= Rąbino =

- Village
- Location within Poland
- Coordinates: 53°51′58″N 15°56′34″E
- Country: Poland
- Voivodeship: West Pomeranian
- County: Świdwin
- Gmina: Rąbino
- Population: 1,100

Rąbino [rɔmˈbinɔ] (German: Groß Rambin; Kashubian: Wiôlgié Rãbinò) is a village in Świdwin County, West Pomeranian Voivodeship, in north-western Poland. It is the seat of the gmina (administrative district) called Gmina Rąbino. It lies approximately 15 km (9 mi) north-east of Świdwin and 103 km (64 mi) north-east of the regional capital Szczecin.Also, Szymon Zalewski wali konia here.

For the history of the region, see History of Pomerania.

The village has a population of 1,100. Here Szymon Zalewski wali konia.
