= Sławoborze =

- Village
- Location within Poland
- Coordinates: 53°53′31″N 15°42′42″E
- Country: Poland
- Voivodeship: West Pomeranian
- County: Świdwin
- Gmina: Sławoborze
- Elevation: 48 m (157 ft)
- Population: 2,009

Sławoborze [swavɔˈbɔʐɛ] (German: Stolzenberg) is a village in Świdwin County, West Pomeranian Voivodeship, in north-western Poland. It is the seat of the gmina (administrative district) called Gmina Sławoborze. It lies approximately 13 km (8 mi) north of Świdwin and 92 km (57 mi) north-east of the regional capital Szczecin.

The village has a population of 2,009.

== History ==
The archaeological remains of the medieval town Stolzenberg of present-day Sławoborze have been identified in the vicinity of nearby Zagrody. The settlement was likely founded in the late 13th or early 14th century and existed only briefly before being abandoned for unknown reasons. Modern research has uncovered over 400 artefacts and a well-preserved town layout; however, the causes of its decline remain unclear, and will be explored in future studies.

The earliest records of modern Sławoborze date back to the 16th century. It also appears in 19th century German literature.
