= Świdwin =

Town in West Pomeranian Voivodeship, Poland

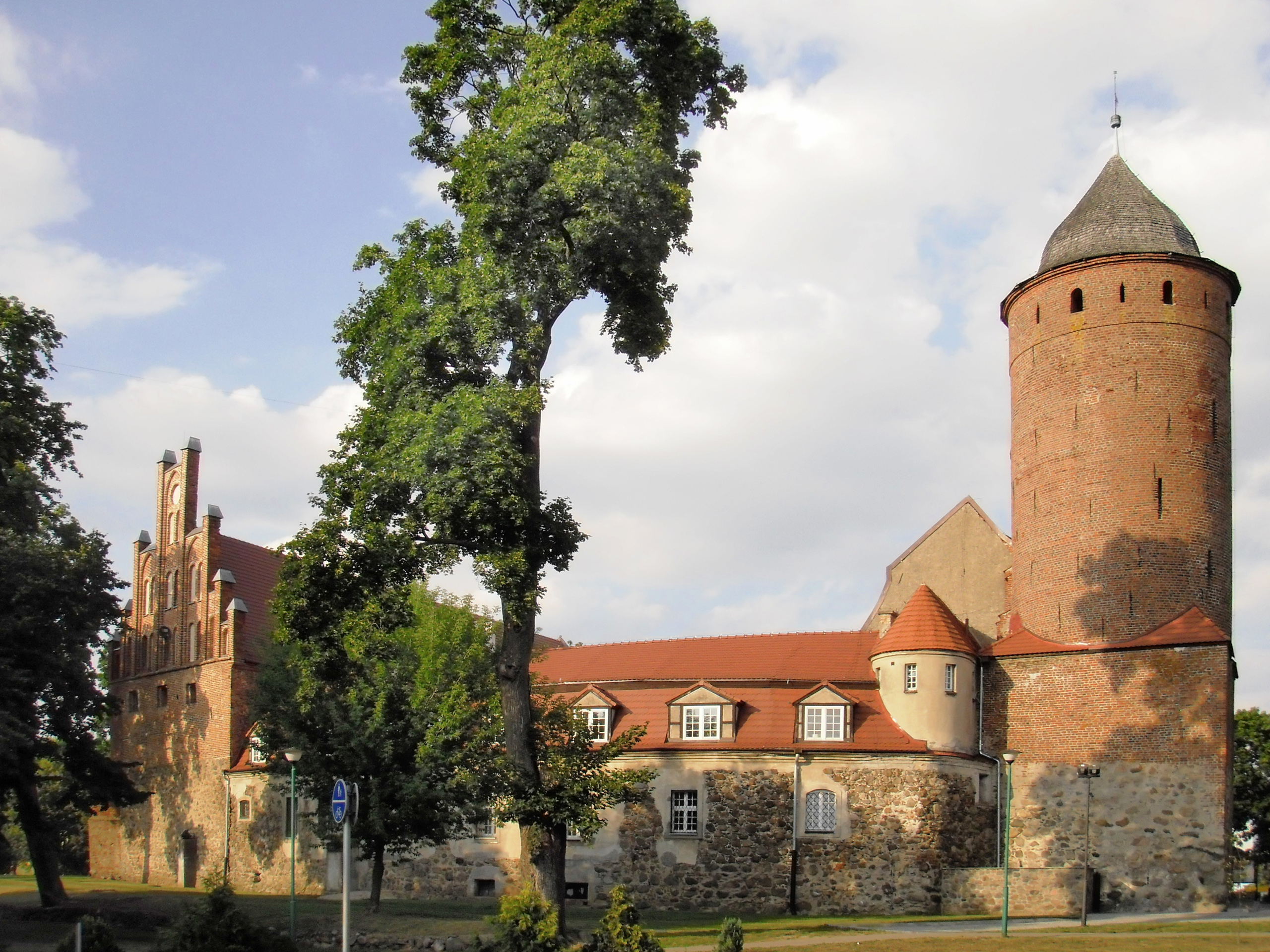
- Świdwin Castle

- Coat of arms

- Location within Poland
- Coordinates: 53°47′N 15°46′E
- Country: Poland
- Voivodeship: West Pomeranian
- County: Świdwin
- Gmina: Świdwin (urban gmina)

Government
  - Mayor: Piotr Feliński

Area
  - Total: 22.38 km^{2} (8.64 sq mi)
- Elevation: 99 m (325 ft)

Population (2018)
  - Total: 15,725
  - Density: 702/km^{2} (1,820/sq mi)
- Time zone: UTC+1 (CET)
  - Summer (DST): UTC+2 (CEST)
- Zip code: 78-300 to 78-301
- Area code: +48-(0)94
- Vehicle registration: ZSD
- Website: www.swidwin.pl

Świdwin [ˈɕfidvin] (German: Schivelbein; Kashubian: Skwilbëno) is a town in West Pomeranian Voivodeship of northwestern Poland. It is the capital of Świdwin County, and the administrative seat of Gmina Świdwin. Świdwin is situated in the historic Pomerania region on the left bank of the Rega river, about 100 km (62 mi) east of the regional capital Szczecin and 44 km (27 mi) south of the Baltic coast at Kołobrzeg. In 2018 the town had a population of 15,725.

== History ==
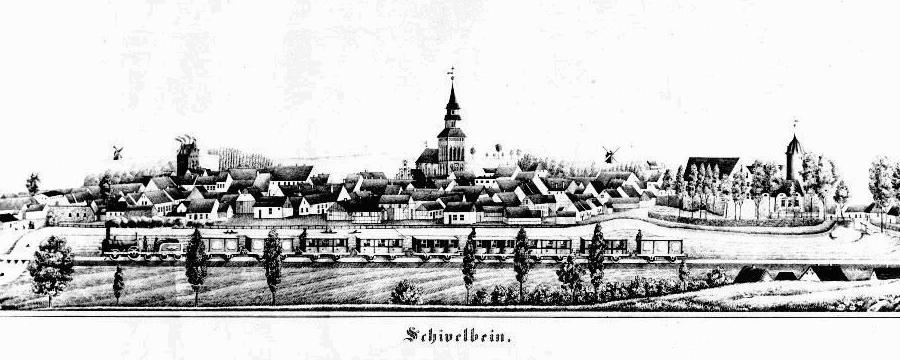
Schivelbein about 1860, with the new railway line to Stargard

The area became part of the emerging Polish state under its first historic ruler Mieszko I around 967. In the 12th century there was a gród on the trade route from the coastal city of Kołobrzeg to Greater Poland. Following the fragmentation of Poland, it formed part of the Duchy of Pomerania. Duke Barnim I granted the settlement to the Premonstratensians from Trzebiatów. In 1248 the duke ceded the area to the Bishop of Kamień, who shortly afterwards sold it to the Ascanian margraves of Brandenburg. Schivelbein was incorporated as the northeastern outpost of the Neumark region. It was granted town rights by 1296. From 1373 it was part of the Lands of the Bohemian (Czech) Crown as one of its northernmost towns, in 1384 it was passed to the State of the Teutonic Order, and in 1455 to Brandenburg, which possession it remained until the dissolution of the Holy Roman Empire in 1806. In the 15th century there were disputes with the nearby town of Białogard, and in 1469 even a battle was fought between the towns. Nowadays, an annual medieval-style competition is organized between the inhabitants of both towns. In 1477 a Carthusian monastery was established, which was secularized in 1539. Brewing developed at that time. In 1550, around 30% of the population died in an epidemic. In the 17th century the town suffered as a result of two fires and the Thirty Years' War. In 1816 it became part of the Prussian province of Pomerania.

The town had a Jewish population of 150 in the early 1930s, before Hitler's rise to power. By Kristallnacht, most Jews had left the town, but those left were the victims of violence, and only 34 remained by May 1939. The unknown number remaining in July 1942 were sent to concentration camps.

The Battle of Świdwin took place south of the town during 6–7 March 1945, in which a German SS corps was encircled and destroyed by two Soviet and one Polish armies. After the town was captured, a Soviet general was killed by a member of the Hitler Youth. The reprisals that followed saw the men shot, and the women and girls raped by Soviet troops.

After World War II, the town became again part of Poland, although with a Soviet-installed communist regime, which stayed in power until the Fall of Communism in the 1980s. The town's name was name changed to Świbowina, which was officially renamed to Świdwin in 1946. In the following years, the Polish anti-communist resistance was active in Świdwin, including local organizations Home Army II and Konspiracyjne Wojsko Polskie (Underground Polish Army).

Until at least 1947, the Polish operated an internment camp in the town. which became overcrowded. In February 1947, the British administration in occupied Germany refused to accept refugees so that the camp became completely overcrowded. Many Germans died at the dire conditions.

The town's first post-war mayor was Jan Górski, and Polish schools, institutions and factories were established, however war damage was not removed until the 1950s. From 1950 to 1998, it was administratively located in the Koszalin Voivodeship.

== Population ==
Historical population

| Year | Pop. | ±% |
|---|---|---|
| 1900 | 6,742 | — |
| 1910 | 7,715 | +14.4% |
| 1925 | 8,447 | +9.5% |
| 1939 | 9,714 | +15.0% |
| 1950 | 4,951 | −49.0% |

| Year | Pop. | ±% |
|---|---|---|
| 1960 | 10,001 | +102.0% |
| 1970 | 12,600 | +26.0% |
| 1975 | 13,500 | +7.1% |
| 1980 | 14,000 | +3.7% |
| 2004 | 17,000 | +21.4% |

| Year | Pop. | ±% |
|---|---|---|
| 2005 | 16,240 | −4.5% |
| 2008 | 15,486 | −4.6% |
| 2009 | 15,621 | +0.9% |
| 2010 | 15,503 | −0.8% |
| 2018 | 15,725 | +1.4% |

== Sights ==
Historic sights of Świdwin (examples)

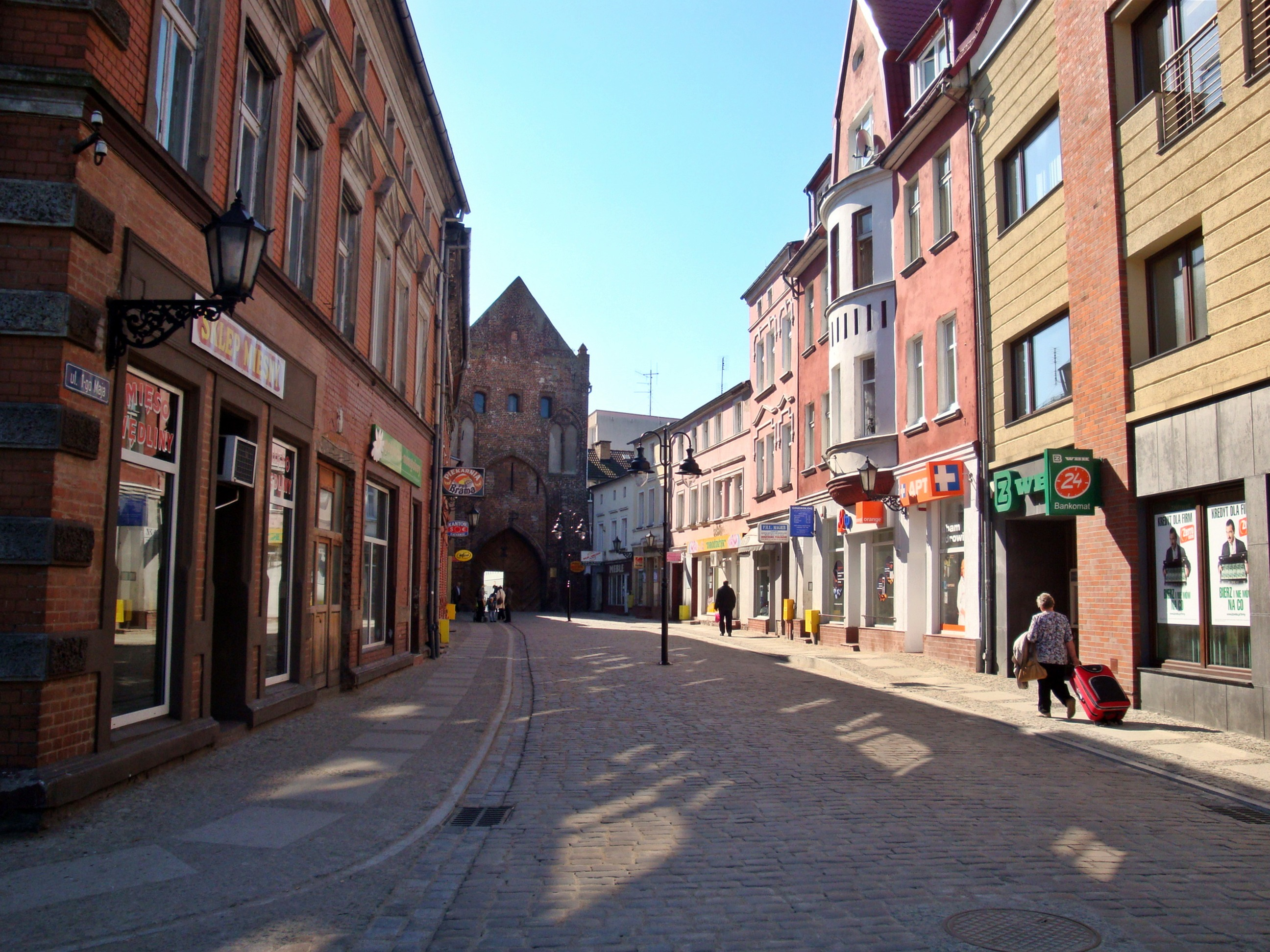
Historic center with the Stone Gate

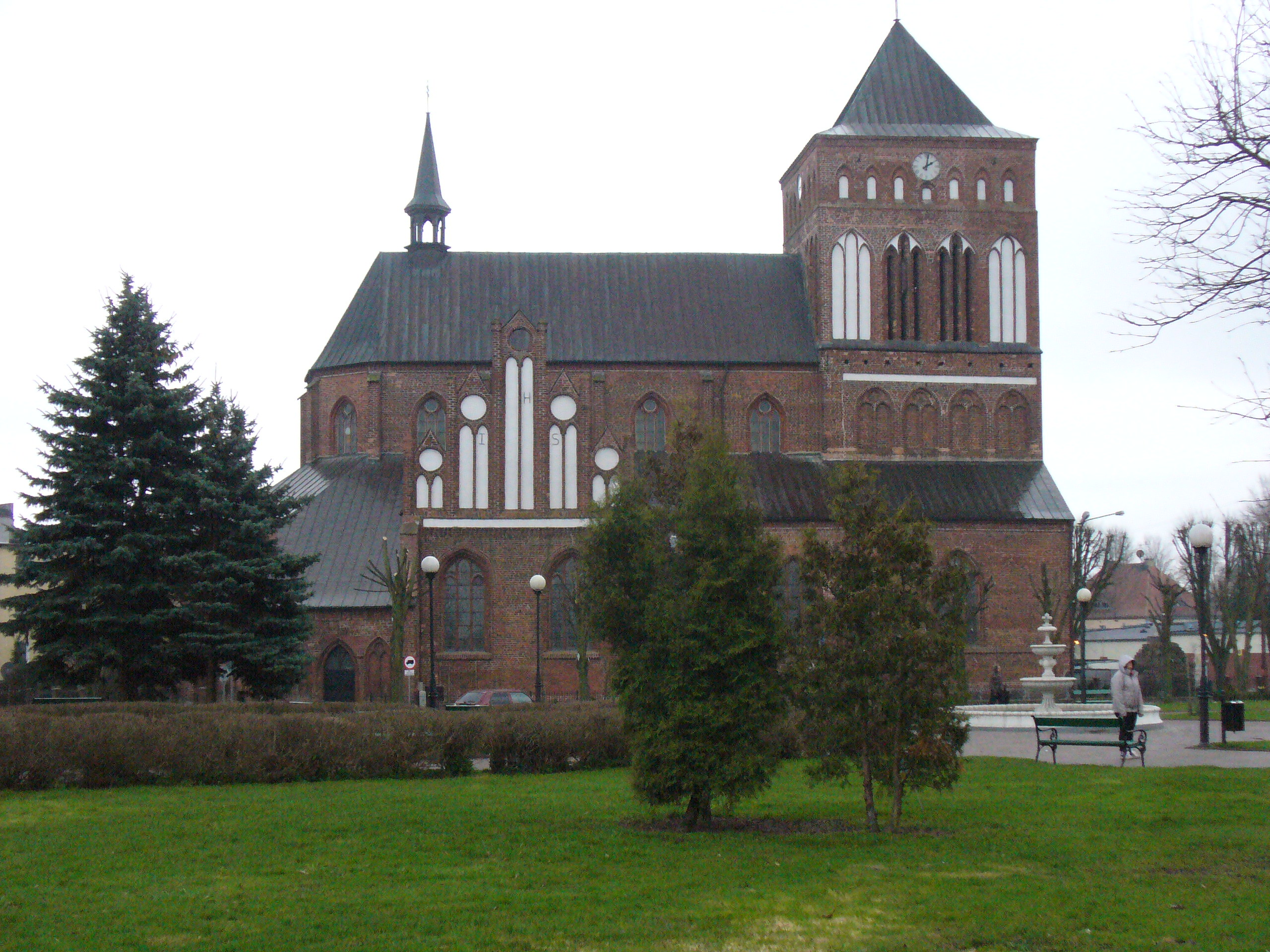
Our Lady of Perpetual Help church

The main historic landmarks of Świdwin are the Gothic-Baroque castle (Zamek joannicki), the Gothic Stone Gate (Brama Kamienna), the municipal park (park miejski), the Świdwin Bismarck Tower (Wieża Bismarcka w Świdwinie) and the Gothic church of Our Lady of Perpetual Help (Kościół Matki Boskiej Nieustającej Pomocy) from the 14th century.

Overgrown footpath in Świdwin municipal park (2026)

The Świdwin castle was initially a gothic medieval castle, modified in the classic baroque style in the 18th century that began being built in the 13th century under the Margraves of Brandenburg and was completed in the 14th century. The castle features 12 meter tall brick curtain walls, an oval courtyard, and a prominent cylindrical tower built during the Teutonic administration. Althought the castle survived WWII, it was burned down by the Red Army during the battle of Świdwin in 1945, and was rebuilt in the 1960s. The castle is now the Świdwin Cultural Center, featuring a museum, library and auditorium and a legally protected cultural monument (A1191).

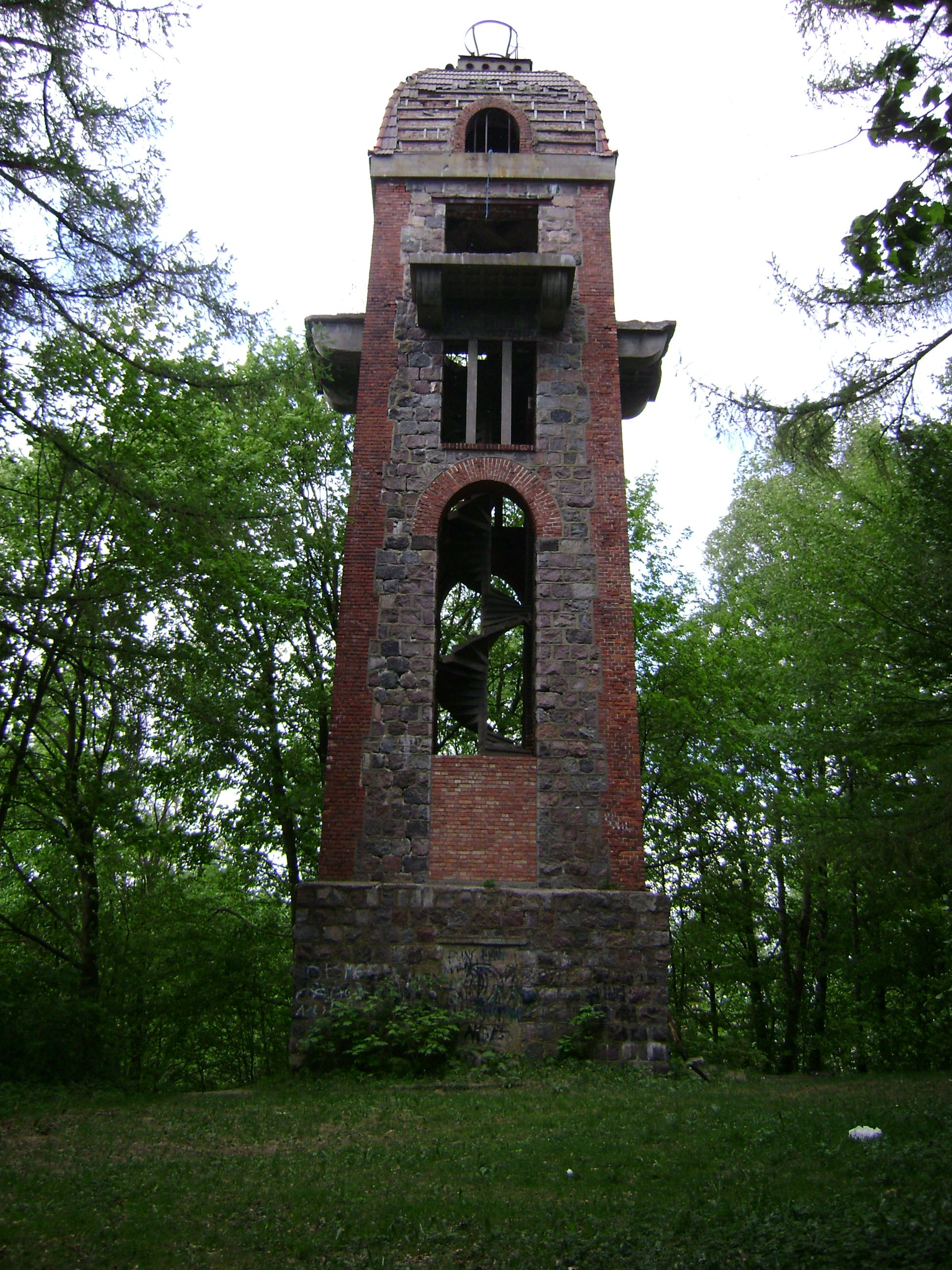
Bismarck tower in Świdwin municipal park in 2009

The 14th century Stone Gate is the only surviving gate from the city's medieval defenses. It was built in 1475. Althought the surrounding buildings and streets suffered major damage during WWII, the gate remained standing. It can be found on the 1-May street (ulica pierwszego Maja) alongside a market with restaurants and various shops.

The Bismarck tower in Świdwin is one of 240 built in the world. 40 were built in modern day Poland and to this day only 17 remain standing. The tower was officially opened on the 17 September 1911, and stands at 22 meters. It sits on the terrain of the municipal park and is accesible via footpaths and a staircase.

The Gothic church of Our Lady of Perpetual Help (Kościół Matki Boskiej Nieustającej Pomocy) Is the main catholic church in Świdwin, built in 1338. The church is constructed from dark brick and follows a three nave basillica shape. The church changed from Protestant to Catholic ownership throughout its history, and suffered 3 seaerate fires during the 17th and 18th centuries, before being 'seriously damaged during WWII'. Today it remains in upkeep and use by the city.

== Świdwin's airport ==
The military airport operated by the Polish Air Force is located about 5 km (3.11 mi) from the city centre. Civilians are not permitted to enter, but this airport is often used for government's aircraft. The runway has a length of 2.5 km (1.55 mi) and a width of 60 m (196.85 ft).

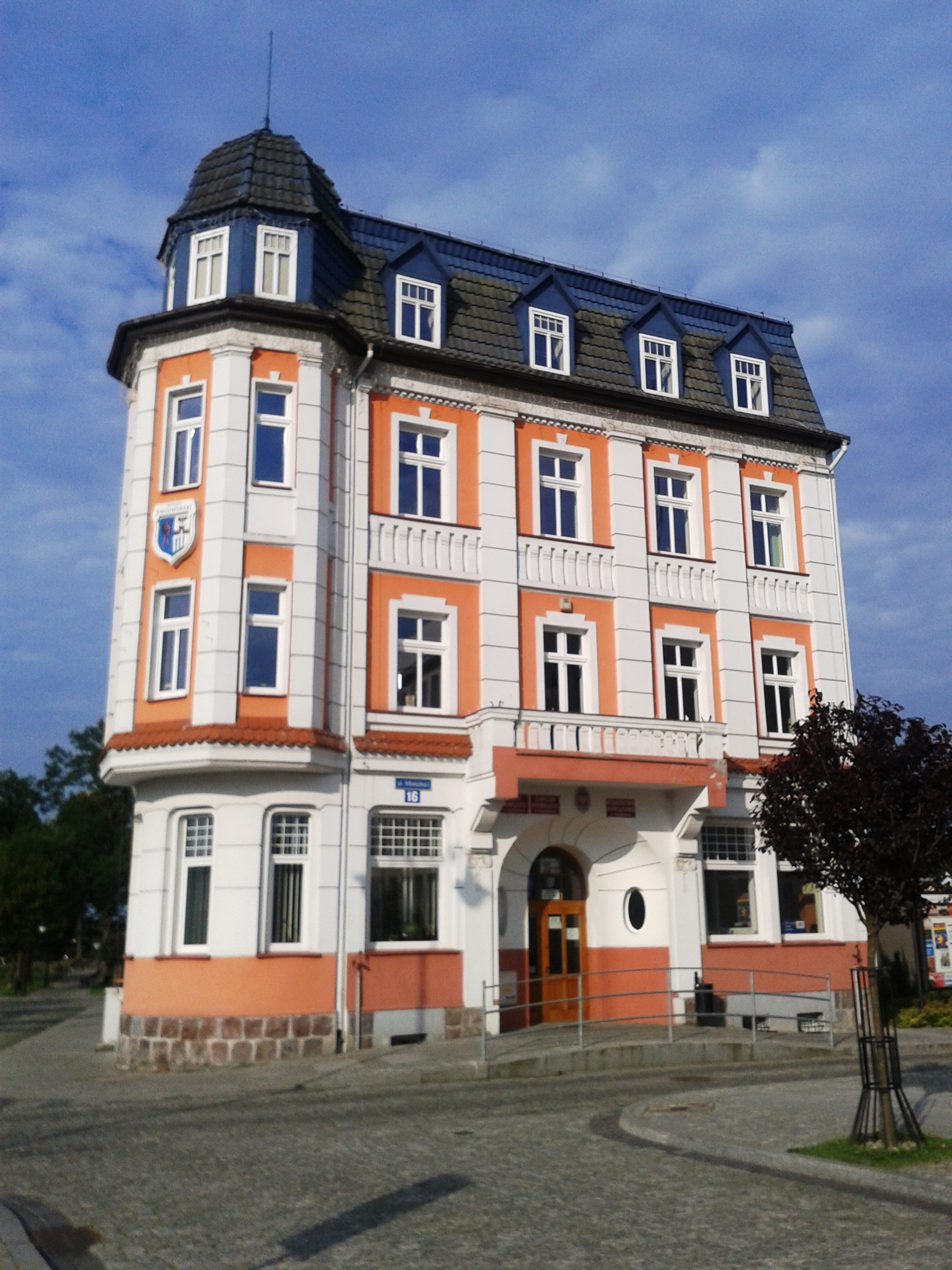
Świdwin County office

== Notable people ==
- Władysław Blin (born 1954), Roman Catholic bishop
- Otto Georg Bogislaf von Glasenapp (1853–1928), Vice president of the Reichsbank
- Grzegorz Halama (born 1970), Polish parodist and cabaret actor.
- Johannes Poeppel (1921–2007), general in the German Bundeswehr
- Rudolf Virchow (1821–1902), German physician, anthropologist, pathologist, prehistorian, biologist, writer, editor, and politician
- Teresa Zurowski (born 1956), Polish-Austrian handball player

== International relations ==
=== Twin towns — sister cities ===
Świdwin is twinned with:

- Sanitz, Germany
