= Von Versen =

von Versen is a German surname. Notable people with the surname include:

- Johann Georg Leopold von Versen (1791–1868), German noble and military officer
- Maximilian von Versen (1833–1893), German noble and military officer
