= Zastawa =

- Village
- Location within Poland
- Coordinates: 53°52′29″N 16°12′17″E
- Country: Poland
- Voivodeship: West Pomeranian
- County: Białogard
- Gmina: Tychowo
- Population: 10

Zastawa [zasˈtava] (German: Muttriner Mühle) is a village in the administrative district of Gmina Tychowo, within Białogard County, West Pomeranian Voivodeship, in north-western Poland. It lies approximately 8 km (5 mi) south-west of Tychowo, 21 km (13 mi) south-east of Białogard, and 119 km (74 mi) north-east of the regional capital Szczecin.

== History ==
The settlement was originally known as Muttriner Mühle, and it was attached to the Muttrin estate (modern day Motarzyn). In 1867, the hamlet had 9 residents.

Today, the village has a population of 10.
