= Trygław (glacial erratic) =

- IUCN category III (natural monument or feature)
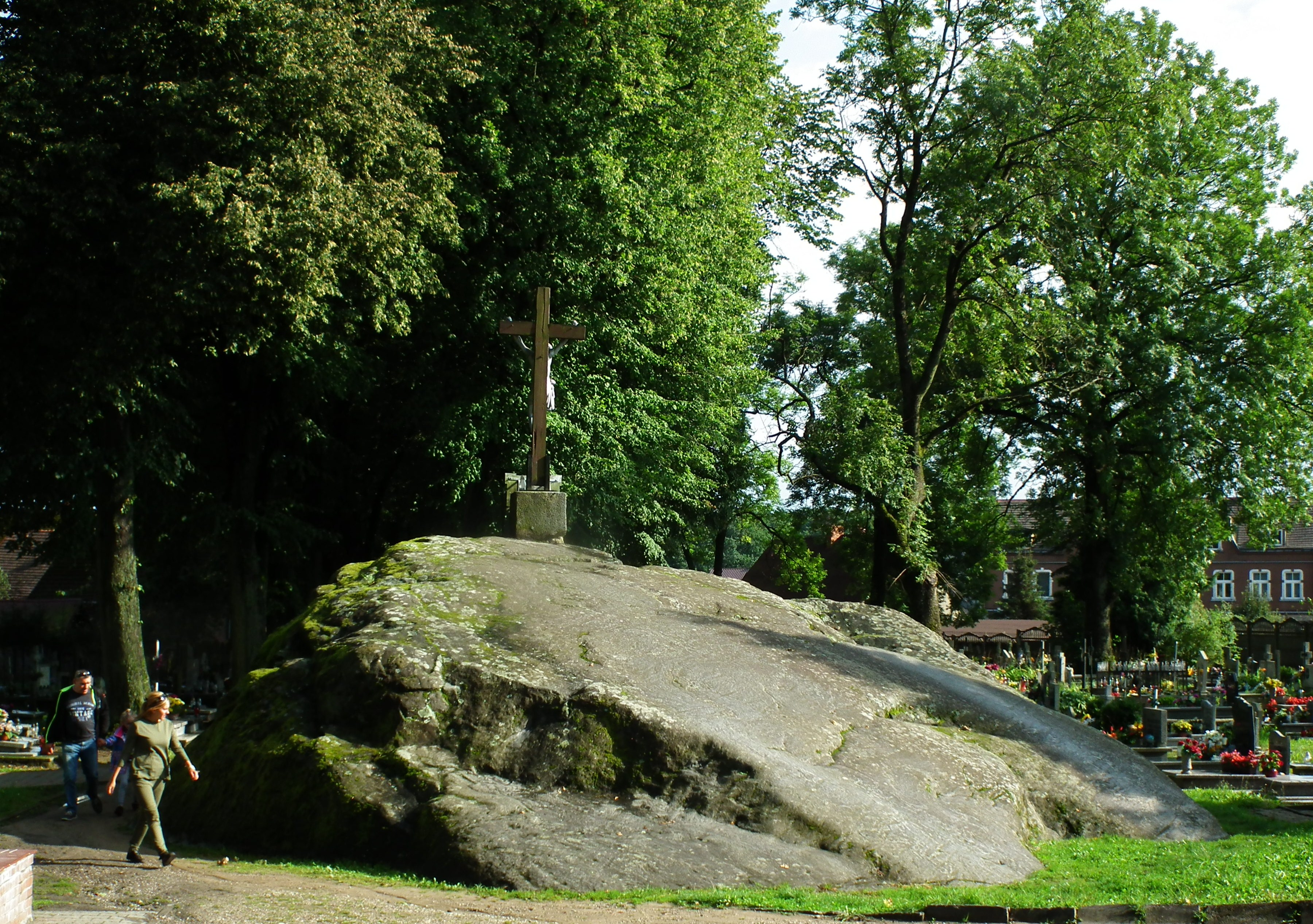

- Location within Poland Location within West Pomeranian Voivodeship
- Location: Tychowo, Poland
- Coordinates: 53°55′53.5″N 16°15′38.7″E
- Length: 16 metres (52 ft)
- Width: 11 metres (36 ft)
- Established: February 20, 1954

Trygław (IPA: [trɨg.wav]) is the largest glacial erratic in Poland and one of the largest in Europe. It is located in the town of Tychowo, in Gmina Tychowo, Białogard County, West Pomeranian Voivodeship in north-western Poland. It is located in the local cemetery.

The boulder's circumference is about 50 metres (160 ft), length 16 metres (52 ft), width 11 metres (36 ft), height 7.8 metres (26 ft) (including 4 metres (13 ft) underground), volume about 860 m^{3}, estimated weight about 2000 tons.

The erratic, made of dark gray gneiss, was transported from Scandinavia by the ice sheet during the last glaciation, probably from the vicinity of Vidbo or Uppsala (Sweden). There are clearly visible scratches on the surface – traces of dragging by the ice sheet.

Numerous local legends are associated with the boulder; the name is said to come from god Triglav, whose golden statue is said to be buried under the boulder. In two places, the stone, when struck, makes a dull sound. On the first Sunday of 1874, German residents erected a wooden cross with a figure of the crucified Christ on it. The figure is the work of sculptor Wilhelm Achtermann, and was cast in a Berlin iron foundry by Moritz Geiß. Under the cross, there is a board with a quatrain, founded by Hans Hugo von Kleist-Retzow of Kikowo and Hugo von Kleist-Retzow of Tychowo. The author of the quatrain is Hans. The text in English translation is:

Idolatry and sin covered the country with darkness before Jesus brought light and life through his death. He put Triglav under a stone, locking him up. And he leads his children into the arms of the Father.

Nowadays, every year on All Saints' Day the stone is used as an altar on which mass is celebrated.

Since 1954 it has been under legal protection as a natural monument. Since 1996 it has been included in the coat of arms of Tychowo.
