= Podborsko =

- Village
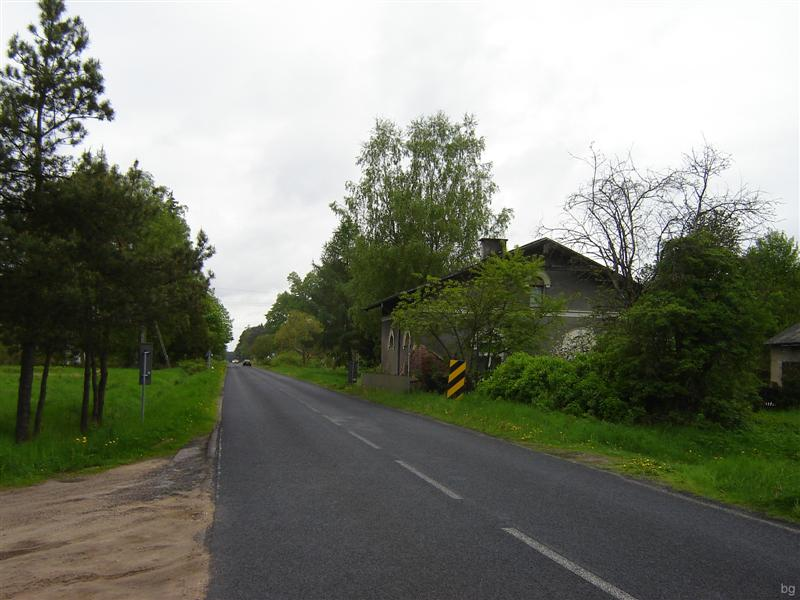

- Location within Poland
- Coordinates: 53°55′58″N 16°8′14″E
- Country: Poland
- Voivodeship: West Pomeranian
- County: Białogard
- Gmina: Tychowo
- Population: 60

Podborsko [pɔdˈbɔrskɔ] is a village in the administrative district of Gmina Tychowo, within Białogard County, West Pomeranian Voivodeship, in north-western Poland. It lies approximately 9 km (6 mi) west of Tychowo, 13 km (8 mi) southeast of Białogard, and 118 km (73 mi) northeast of the regional capital Szczecin.

For the history of the region, see History of Pomerania. The village has a population of 60.

== Nuclear weapons depot ==
A little to the north of the village are the remains of an underground Cold War Soviet nuclear military base. From the late 1960s, the base held Soviet tactical nuclear weapons underground in a hidden bunker, to be used by the Polish Army in the event of war. The base, special depot 3001, was one of the three in Poland that held nuclear weapons (the two others being in Brzeźnica-Kolonia near Jastrowie (No. 3002) and on Lake Buszno near Templewo (No. 3003)). The weapons were withdrawn from Podborsko before the withdrawal of Soviet troops from Poland in 1993. In 2005, the facility was transferred to the Polish Prison Service and an external branch of the detention center in Koszalin was established here. Since 2015, the facility has been run by the Museum of Polish Arms in Kołobrzeg, which in September 2016 opened an exhibition in the bunker titled "Cold War Museum".
