= Poland and weapons of mass destruction =

Poland is not known or believed to possess weapons of mass destruction. During the Cold War, Soviet nuclear warheads were stockpiled in Poland and designated to deploy within the Polish People's Army. Poland was also working with Russia to help eliminate the large stockpiles of chemical and biological weapons developed by the Warsaw Pact countries. Poland ratified the Geneva Protocol on 4 February 1929.

== Chemical weapons ==
Poland ratified the Chemical Weapons Convention in August 1995 and did not declare any offensive program or chemical weapons stockpiles. In 2004 during the G8 Summit, the Polish-Russian agreement in the sphere of chemical weapons destruction was reached. The chemical weapons agreement will assist Russia in disposing of its lewisite stockpiles.

== Biological weapons ==
Poland ratified the Biological Weapons Convention (BWC) on 25 January 1973 and is not known to have conducted any activity prohibited by the BWC.

== Nuclear weapons ==
=== International treaties ===
Poland signed the Nuclear Non-Proliferation Treaty (NPT) in 1968 and deposited the signature in 1969.

=== Soviet nuclear warheads in Poland ===
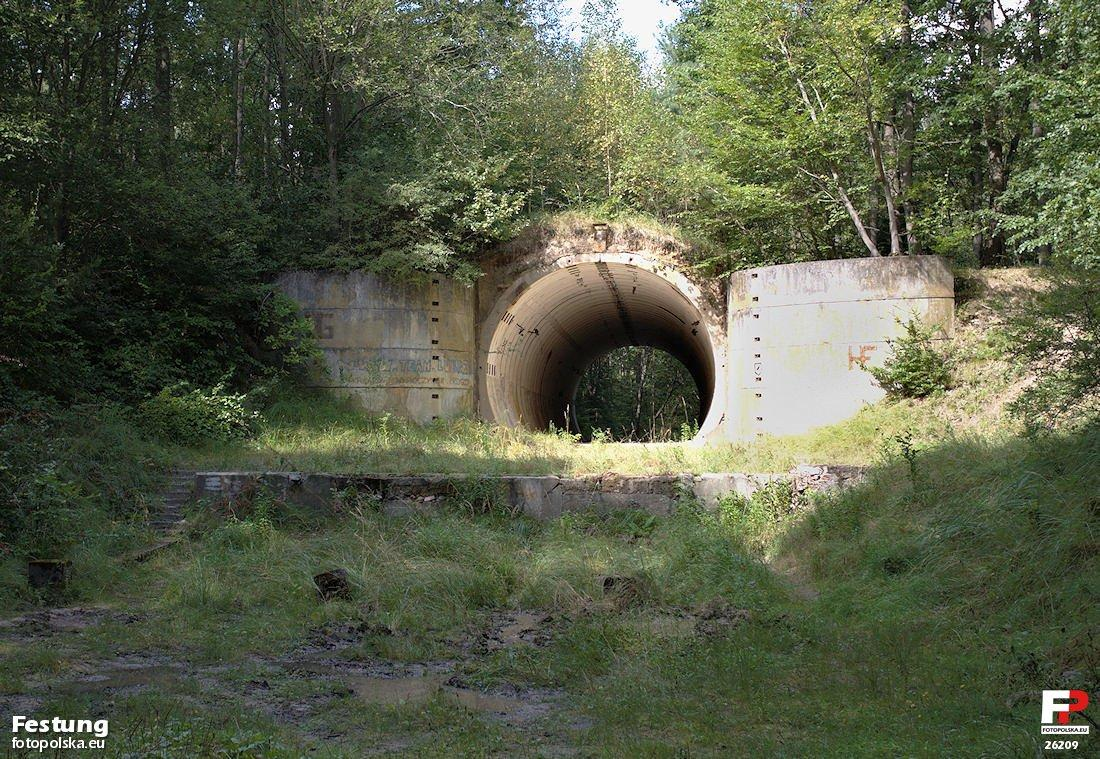
Soviet storage site of nuclear weapons in Templewo

Poland has possessed Soviet nuclear weapons. Formerly, Poland was part of the Warsaw Pact. This meant that the Polish People's Army was equipped with aircraft (such as MiG-21, Su-7 and Su-22), as well as short range ballistic missiles (such as R-300 Elbrus, 9K52 Luna-M and OTR-21 Tochka) that could be used to deliver Soviet nuclear weapons. These could and probably would be provided in time of war. Prior to the end of the Cold War, the Soviet Union maintained large numbers of troops on Polish territory. These troops were equipped with nuclear weapons. In 1991, Poland announced that they would remove the nuclear capable delivery systems from their weapons inventory. They decided to keep about 40 of the OTR-21 Tochka systems armed with conventional warheads for self-defense. These launchers have now been completely retired.

From the early 1960s, nuclear weapons were stored on Soviet Armed Forces bases for their own use, in response to United States positioning nuclear weapons in Western Europe from the mid-1950s. In 1967 the Vistula Programme was agreed to build storage facilities so Soviet nuclear weapons could be made available to Polish forces in the event of war, mirroring the NATO nuclear sharing concept. Three storage site were completed late 1969, in forests near the villages of Brzeźnica-Kolonia, Podborsko and Templewo in western Poland. On 28 February 1970 an agreement was signed on the use of the sites, however the procedure for transferring nuclear warheads to Polish forces was never defined in detail, enabling the Soviet Union to interpret the agreement as it wished and they may have intended to never actually transfer any. In 1990 the agreement ceased to be in force following a year's notice period in the agreement, and the nuclear weapons were probably then removed from Poland.

=== Russo-Ukrainian War ===
In the aftermath of the Russian invasion of Ukraine in 2022, several Polish politicians proposed that Poland host nuclear weapons under the NATO nuclear sharing program, with President Andrzej Duda stating the idea had been under discussion. Jarosław Kaczyński, the leader of Poland's then governing party has stated he would like Poland to acquire nuclear weapons itself, but acknowledged it was "unrealistic".

On 7 March 2025, Prime Minister Donald Tusk announced that Poland has undertaken "serious talks" with France to rely on protection offered under France's nuclear umbrella.

In an interview with Polsat on February 15th 2026, President Karol Nawrocki expressed support for the development of a Polish nuclear weapons program as a means of deterring further Russian aggression.

== Bibliography ==
- Luczak, Wojciech (July 1996). "Poland's Atomic Adventure". Air International. Vol. 51, no. 1. pp. 18–21. ISSN 0306-5634.
