= Wicewo =

- Village
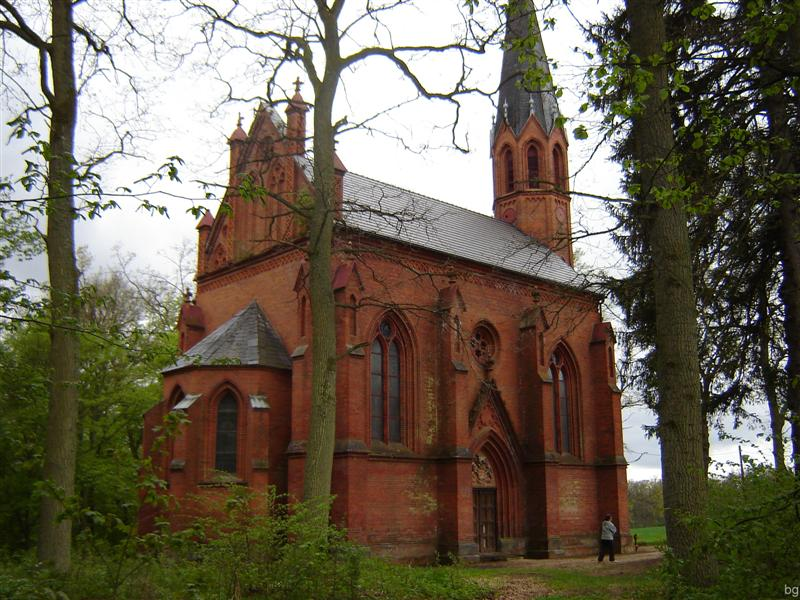
- Church

- Location within Poland
- Coordinates: 53°53′20″N 16°7′47″E
- Country: Poland
- Voivodeship: West Pomeranian
- County: Białogard
- Gmina: Tychowo
- Population: 200

Wicewo [viˈt͡sɛvɔ] (German: Vietzow) is a village in the administrative district of Gmina Tychowo, within Białogard County, West Pomeranian Voivodeship, in north-western Poland. It lies approximately 10 km (6 mi) south-west of Tychowo, 16 km (10 mi) south-east of Białogard, and 115 km (71 mi) north-east of the regional capital Szczecin.

== Notable residents ==
- Ewald Georg von Kleist (1700–1748), Lutheran cleric
