= Bukowo, Białogard County =

Bukowo
- Village
- Location within Poland
- Coordinates: 53°58′N 16°14′E
- Country: Poland
- Voivodeship: West Pomeranian
- County: Białogard
- Gmina: Tychowo

Bukowo [buˈkɔvɔ] is a village in the administrative district of Gmina Tychowo, within Białogard County, West Pomeranian Voivodeship, in north-western Poland. It lies approximately 5 km (3 mi) north-west of Tychowo, 17 km (11 mi) east of Białogard, and 125 km (78 mi) north-east of the regional capital Szczecin.

For the history of the region, see History of Pomerania.
