= Dobrówko =

- Village
- Location within Poland
- Coordinates: 53°59′5″N 16°6′41″E
- Country: Poland
- Voivodeship: West Pomeranian
- County: Białogard
- Gmina: Tychowo

Dobrówko [dɔˈbrufkɔ] is a village in the administrative district of Gmina Tychowo, within Białogard County, West Pomeranian Voivodeship, in north-western Poland. It lies approximately 12 km (7 mi) north-west of Tychowo, 9 km (6 mi) east of Białogard, and 119 km (74 mi) north-east of the regional capital Szczecin.
