= Osówko, West Pomeranian Voivodeship =

Osówko
- Village
- Location within Poland
- Coordinates: 53°54′N 16°5′E
- Country: Poland
- Voivodeship: West Pomeranian
- County: Białogard
- Gmina: Tychowo

Osówko [ɔˈsufkɔ] (German Wutzow) is a village in the administrative district of Gmina Tychowo, within Białogard County, West Pomeranian Voivodeship, in north-western Poland. It lies approximately 13 km (8 mi) west of Tychowo, 13 km (8 mi) south-east of Białogard, and 113 km (70 mi) north-east of the regional capital Szczecin.

For the history of the region, see History of Pomerania.
