= Wełdkówko =

- Village
- Location within Poland
- Coordinates: 53°58′40″N 16°21′38″E
- Country: Poland
- Voivodeship: West Pomeranian
- County: Białogard
- Gmina: Tychowo
- Population: 40

Wełdkówko [vɛu̯tˈkufkɔ] (German: Klein Voldekow) is a village in the administrative district of Gmina Tychowo, within Białogard County, West Pomeranian Voivodeship, in north-western Poland. It lies approximately 9 km (6 mi) north-east of Tychowo, 25 km (16 mi) east of Białogard, and 133 km (83 mi) north-east of the regional capital Szczecin.

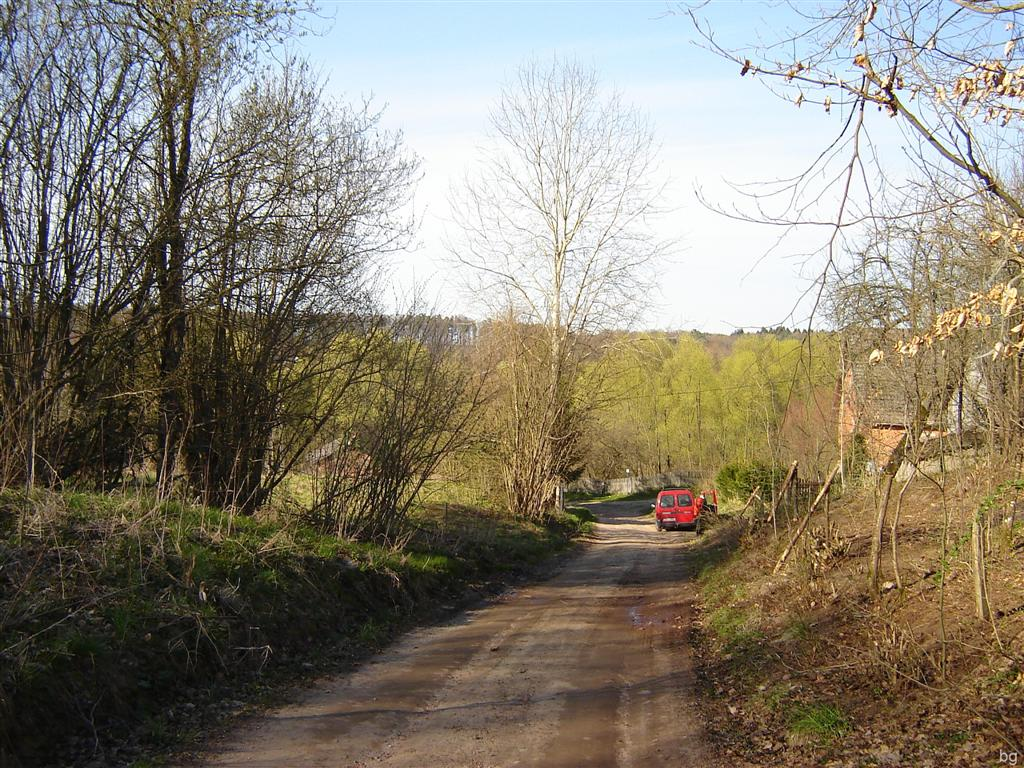
Wełdkówko

For the history of the region, see History of Pomerania.

The village has a population of 40.
