= Kościanka =

- Settlement
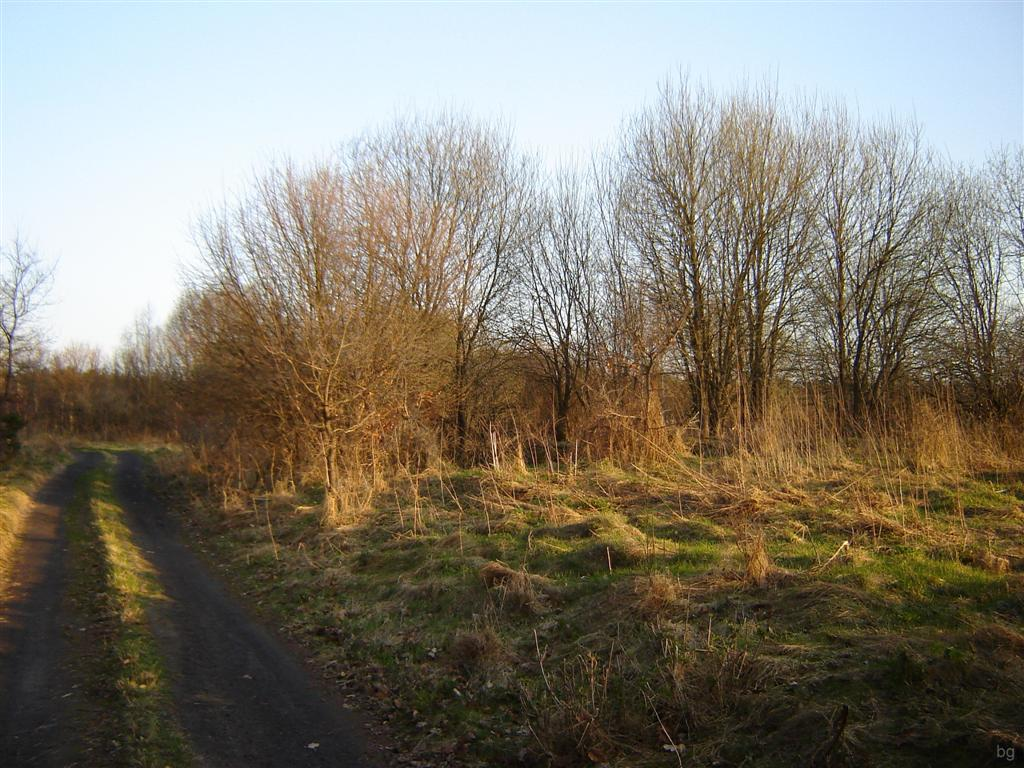
- Area where the former village was located

- Location within Poland
- Coordinates: 53°56′38″N 16°19′3″E
- Country: Poland
- Voivodeship: West Pomeranian
- County: Białogard
- Gmina: Tychowo

Kościanka [kɔɕˈt͡ɕanka] (German: Hansfelde) is a former settlement in the administrative district of Gmina Tychowo, within Białogard County, West Pomeranian Voivodeship, in north-western Poland. It lies approximately 5 km (3 mi) east of Tychowo, 23 km (14 mi) east of Białogard, and 129 km (80 mi) north-east of the regional capital Szczecin.

== See also ==
- History of Pomerania
