= Żukówek =

- Settlement
- Location within Poland
- Coordinates: 53°53′12″N 16°13′46″E
- Country: Poland
- Voivodeship: West Pomeranian
- County: Białogard
- Gmina: Tychowo

Żukówek [ʐuˈkuvɛk] (German: Petersdorf) is a settlement in the administrative district of Gmina Tychowo, within Białogard County, West Pomeranian Voivodeship, in north-western Poland. It lies approximately 6 km (4 mi) south-west of Tychowo, 21 km (13 mi) south-east of Białogard, and 121 km (75 mi) north-east of the regional capital Szczecin.

== See also ==
- History of Pomerania
