= Kowalki, West Pomeranian Voivodeship =

Kowalki
- Village
- Location within Poland
- Coordinates: 53°55′N 16°22′E
- Country: Poland
- Voivodeship: West Pomeranian
- County: Białogard
- Gmina: Tychowo

Kowalki [kɔˈvalki] (German Kowalk) is a village in the administrative district of Gmina Tychowo, within Białogard County, West Pomeranian Voivodeship, in north-western Poland. It lies approximately 8 km (5 mi) east of Tychowo, 27 km (17 mi) east of Białogard, and 131 km (81 mi) north-east of the regional capital Szczecin.

For the history of the region, see History of Pomerania.
