= Poppo (bishop of Kraków) =

Poppo (d. 1008/9?) is considered to be the first Bishop of Kraków although missionary bishops had been active in the years just prior to his bishopric.

Little is known about his life and deeds except the fact, as his name suggests, he was probably of German origin, possibly from Rhineland or Lotharingia. It is also almost certain that the foundations of the first Romanesque building of the Church of St. Wenceslaus (now the Wawel Cathedral) were laid during his episcopate. His name is known from two sources: first, the Chronicle of Thietmar of Merseburg who wrote that three bishops (Reinbern, Bishop of Solno-Kołobrzeg; Poppo of Kraków; and John I of Wroclaw) were subjected to Bishops of Gniezno metropolis. Second, Poppo is listed in the oldest version of the Catalogue of the Kraków Bishops, written before 1267, which states the names of first nineteen Kraków bishops.

What is somewhat mysterious is that Poppo is listed in the Catalogue as a bishop only in third place, behind the otherwise-unknown "Prohor" (Prohorius) and "Proculf" (Proculphus). Who the two supposed predecessors were is still unclear; however, there is an opinion that they were real figures and therefore the Kraków diocese was in fact first established in the second half of the 10th century, when Kraków and Lesser Poland were under the rule of Czech Přemyslids (their supremacy was ended by Duke Boleslav the Brave). Poppo was then really the first bishop of the newly established diocese, but already within the Duchy of Poland.

There is also some speculation that he was the same person as Gompo, listed in the Catalogue right after him, in fourth place. In that case, therefore, the length of Poppo's bishop office would lasted until 1016/18.

Preceded by Proculf (?)	Bishop of Kraków; 1000–1008	Succeeded by Gompo
