= Ruth von Kleist-Retzow =

German noblewoman

Ruth von Kleist-Retzow (by birth, the Countess of Zedlitz-Trützschler: 4 February 1867 – 2 October 1945) was born into the German nobility and married into a Prussian army family. She was horrified by the rise of National Socialism, becoming involved both with the Confessing Church and, after 1933, with (illegal) opposition to the Hitler government. She was a particular supporter of Dietrich Bonhoeffer who became a regular guest, and whose students would frequently find a refuge at von Kleist-Retzow's Pomeranian estate. At the time of his execution Bonhoeffer was engaged to marry von Kleist-Retzow's granddaughter, with whom he was in love.

== Life ==
Born near Neustädtel (as it was then known) in Lower Silesia, Ruth was the third of the six children born to Count Robert von Zedlitz-Trützschler (1837-1914) by his marriage to Agnes Emilie Countess of Rohr (1840-1928). In 1881 her father was appointed President of the [regional] government in the city known at that time as Oppeln, and the family moved to Oppeln in Upper Silesia. It was here, when she was sixteen, that she first met Jürgen von Kleist-Retzow, a land owner and government administrator from Western Pomerania in the north. They married on Ruth's nineteenth birthday in 1886. Although they had, at that point, still only met three times, Ruth would always insist that theirs was a true love match. They set up home together at Köslin on the Northern coast and then quite soon relocated to nearby Belgard following von Kleist-Retzow's appointment as district governor (Landrat) of the Belgard district. Running a profitable farm on the sandy Pomeranian soil was always a challenge, and in material terms the marriage to a frequently indebted landowner and middle-ranking Prussian administrator left Ruth's quality of life disappointingly diminished, but her commitment to traditional aristocratic standards was undimmed, and she was attracted to the simple unquestioning adherence to patriarchal protestant values and obligations that she found in her husband's family. It was at Belgard that four of their five children were born.

After ten years of married life at Belgard they moved again in 1896 to the von Kieckow family manor house at Kieckow which Jürgen had co-inherited with his siblings in 1892. As his father's oldest surviving son Jürgen now took on responsibility both for the manor and for the accompanying debts. The next year Jürgen von Kleist-Retzow booked himself a stay at a sanatorium, but while on his way he was obliged to stop off at Dresden where he died on 14 December 1897 of a kidney illness. His thirty year old widow was inconsolable. The couple's youngest daughter was just seven months old. At the urging of her father, Ruth von Kleist-Retzow decided to take on sole responsibility for the manor, and for the two villages that it contained.

Two years later, concluding that she would never be able to afford to send her children to boarding schools, she moved to Stettin where she took an apartment for the family. She continued to take responsibility for the estate at Kieckow, which she visited monthly, while day-to-day administration was placed in the hands of a steward. In addition to her own children, she was joined in the Stettin apartment by two foster children, the brothers Gottfried and Herbert von Bismarck, (who were great nephews of the recently deceased ex-chancellor). Herbert later married her daughter Maria. (Note: Maria Ruth Marieagnes Margarete von Kleist-Retzow / von Bismarck 1893–1979)

War broke out in July 1914. With her sons conscripted into the army, and two of her three daughters married, Ruth von Kleist-Retzow moved back to Kieckow and assumed direct control of the family estate. She invited the women of the family to join her at the manor house for the duration of the war. While Ruth ran the estate, her recently acquired daughter-in-law ran the household. Ruth's eldest daughter Spes (Note: Spes Agnes Charlotte Ehrengard von Kleist-Retzow / Stahlberg 1888–1973) provided schooling for fifty children from the village. The middle daughter, Maria, already had small children of her own to look after. The still unmarried youngest daughter, Ruthchen (Note: Ruth Ehrengard Jenny von Kleist-Retzow / von Wedemeyer 1897–1985) kept the accounts for the household and for the estate. At the end of 1918 the war ended and Ruth's youngest daughter married into the land owning class. Her younger son, Konstantin, (Note: Bolko Konstantin Hermann von Kleist-Retzow 1891–1917) had trained as a pilot and then been killed in 1917 but her elder son, Hans Jürgen Friedrich von Kleist-Retzow III (Note: Hans Jürgen Robert Friedrich von Kleist-Retzow 1886–1969) returned in one piece. He now moved with his family into the family manor house while Ruth gave up the city apartment in Stettin completely and moved into a smaller manor house at nearby Klein Krössin. With her children now being self-supporting, money worries seem to have subsided, and she found the leisure to ponder and discuss with friends the theological, political and social questions which had hitherto been left to fester at the back of her mind. An indication of at least some of the questions that preoccupied her comes from the title of the book that she published in 1926: "Die soziale Krisis und die Verantwortung des Gutsbesitzers" ("The Social Crisis and the Responsibility of the Big Landowners").

== Works ==
Her book demonstrated Ruth von Kleist-Retzow's interest in the role of her own social class in the changed democratic conditions of the times. She called on landowners such as herself to acknowledge their responsibilities as "stewards of God" ("Haushalter Gottes") in the management of their estates, which should be used for the good of the people (...der Menschen).

She also involve herself in the "Berneuchen Movement" (Christian youth circle) which took its name from the home of the Viebahn family at Berneuchchen Manor near Neudamm (Landsberg). That involved promoting a renewal of the Protestant Church to involve a holistic piety and commitment to a spiritual life. In many ways that reflected the lifestyle which she had already adopted in her daily life at Kieckow. When the so-called Berneuchener Book was published in 1926 it was signed off by 70 committed participants who shared in responsibility for its contents. 68 of the signatories were men, and only two women: Ruth von Kleist-Retzow and the theologian Anna Paulsen.

During the later 1920s, Ruth von Kleist-Retzow became deeply concerned by the looming menace of National Socialism, entering into an intensive exchange of ideas with the aristocrat-lawyer Ewald von Kleist-Schmenzin whose own warning was published as "Der Nationalsozialismus – eine Gefahr" in 1932. In 1935 she moved back from the countryside to Stettin where she rented and apartment which she converted into a "grandchildren's hostel" ("Enkelpension"), in order to facilitate and keep an eye on the school arrangements for her grandchildren: the return to the city also made it far easier to build up her contacts beyond her own immediate family circle.

In Stettin she very soon came across the large group of enthusiasts around the progressive theologian Dietrich Bonhoeffer who was in charge at the Evangelical Priest Training Establishment ("Predigerseminar") of the recently formed anti-Nazi "Confessing Church" ("Bekennende Kirche") at Finkenwalde, just outside the city on its south side. Von Kleist-Retzow became the intermediary between the two superficially contrasting worlds of the intellectual theologians around Bonhoeffer and the scions of the old Prussian army families, trying to perpetuate traditions of decency and honour on their landed estates in a fast changing worlds. The latter group included the family of her son, Hans Jürgen and her friend and neighbour, Ewald von Kleist-Schmenzin. Bonhoeffer himself spent a month working at his studies on the Klein Krössin estate during September/October 1940 while keeping out of the way of the authorities. Over the next few years the manor became the venue for regular meetings of anti-government resistance activists, and it was in the course of those meetings that plans were drawn up for the assassination of Adolf Hitler. One of the grandchildren under the care of Ruth von Kleist-Retzow was Maria von Wedemeyer, a daughter of her own youngest child - another Ruth - through her marriage to Hans von Wedemeyer. (Hans von Wedemeyer had been killed on 22 August 1942 during the fighting in Russia.) In the course of Bonheoffer's visits to her grandmother's estate he frequently came across Maria von Wedemeyer, and in 1942 they fell in love. They became engaged to be married on 17 January 1943.

The planned assassination was implemented on 20 July 1944: it injured the dictator but failed to kill him. For Ruth von Kleist-Retzow it was followed by the grim experience of hearing that many of her friends and relations had been sentenced to death and executed. Others chose or were persuaded to choose suicide. Her son, Hans Jürgen, was arrested on 21 July 1944, the day following the failed assassination, by the Köslin Gestapo. It was the second time they had arrested him. They were unable to find persuasive evidence linking him to the conspiracy, however, and he was released at the end of November 1944, just as he had been back in 1939, following his previous arrest.

== Death ==
As the end of the war approached Ruth von Kleist-Retzow attempted to escape from the approaching Red army by joining the trek towards the west; but she failed. Ruth von Kleist-Retzow lived long enough to experience the arrival of the Soviet army in Kieckow. She was 78 when she died there on 2 October 1945.
