= Sadkowo, West Pomeranian Voivodeship =

Sadkowo
- Village
- Location within Poland
- Coordinates: 53°53′32″N 16°11′56″E
- Country: Poland
- Voivodeship: West Pomeranian
- County: Białogard
- Gmina: Tychowo
- Population: 320

Sadkowo [satˈkɔvɔ] (German Zadtkow) is a village in the administrative district of Gmina Tychowo, within Białogard County, West Pomeranian Voivodeship, in north-western Poland. It lies approximately 6 kilometres (3.7 mi) south-west of Tychowo, 19 km (12 mi) south-east of Białogard, and 119 km (74 mi) north-east of the regional capital Szczecin.

For the history of the region, see History of Pomerania.
