= Maximilian von Versen =

- Born: Maximilian Felix Christoph Wilhelm Leopold Reinhold Albert Fürchtegott von Versen; 30 November 1833; Wurchow, Kingdom of Prussia
- Died: 7 October 1893; Berlin, German Empire
- Relatives: Johann Georg Leopold von Versen (father)
- Military career
- Allegiance: Kingdom of Prussia
- Branch: Prussian Army
- Rank: General of the Cavalry
- Commands: Guards Cavalry Division; III Army Corps
- Conflicts: Danish War; Austro-Prussian War; Franco-Prussian War
- Awards: Pour le Mérite; Iron Cross 1st class

Maximilian Felix Christoph Wilhelm Leopold Reinhold Albert Fürchtegott von Versen (November 30, 1833, in Wurchow – October 7, 1893, in Berlin) was a German general and nobleman.

== Career ==
Maximilian was the son of Johann Georg Leopold von Versen and first wife Hulda Wilhelmine Luise Henriette Leopoldine Ottilie von Glasenapp. Like his father, Maximilian was an officer in the Prussian Army. During the Austro-Prussian War in 1866, with the rank of Major of Cavalry, he served on the staff of the cavalry division of the Second Army and received the Pour le Merite for the Battle of Königgrätz.

In the next year he requested his temporary resignation from the army to visit the battlefields of Paraguay because of the ferocious resistance presented by the Paraguayans and the "admirable strategy" of Francisco Solano López during the Paraguayan War. King William I of Prussia approved his request, and he went to South America, where he was made prisoner of both the allied forces of Brazil, Argentina and Uruguay (they thought he was hired by Lopez to command his armies), and of the Paraguayans (López thought Von Versen was a spy hired by the allied forces to murder him). He survived the conflict and wrote these episodes and his impressions in the book "Travels in South America and the Great South American War".

Von Versen rejoined the Prussian Army in 1869 and fought in the Franco-Prussian War. He continued to serve throughout the rest of the century; his assignments including being a general-adjutant to Emperor Wilhelm II of Germany, commanding the Guards Cavalry Division and eventually being named commanding general of the III Army Corps. He received his final promotion to General of the Cavalry in 1892 and died in the following year.

== Marriage and children ==
He married in Wiesbaden on May 16, 1871, Alice Brown Clemens (St. Louis, Independent City, Missouri, May 12, 1850 – Burzlaff, August 19, 1912), Lady of Burzlaff and Mandelatz, daughter of James Clemens, Jr. and wife Elizabeth "Eliza" Brown Mullanphy, and had issue, among whom a daughter Hulda Elisabeth Anna von Versen (Merseburg, March 18, 1872 – West Berlin, May 4, 1954), married in Berlin on September 9, 1893, with Georg Gustav von Arnim.
