= Smęcino =

- Village
- Location within Poland
- Coordinates: 53°56′48″N 16°24′46″E
- Country: Poland
- Voivodeship: West Pomeranian
- County: Białogard
- Gmina: Tychowo
- Population: 150

Smęcino [smɛnˈt͡ɕinɔ] (German: Schmenzin) is a village in the administrative district of Gmina Tychowo, within Białogard County, West Pomeranian Voivodeship, in north-western Poland. It lies approximately 11 km (7 mi) east of Tychowo, 29 km (18 mi) east of Białogard, and 135 km (84 mi) north-east of the regional capital Szczecin.

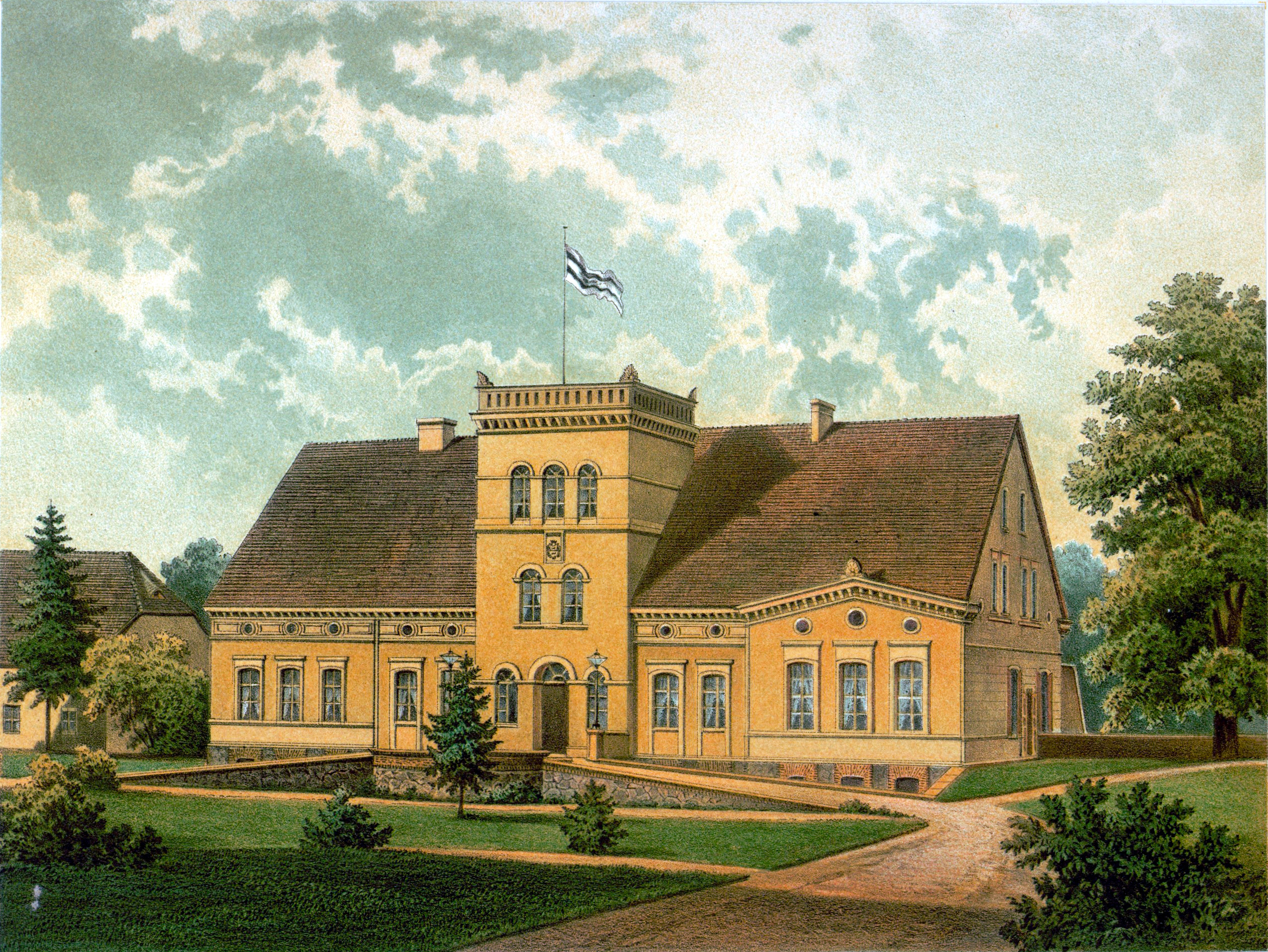
Palace Schmenzin, around 1860, Edition by Alexander Duncker

== Notable residents ==
- Ewald-Heinrich von Kleist-Schmenzin (1922–2013), German resistance fighter and publisher

== See also ==
- History of Pomerania
