= List of largest armed forces =

List of largest armed forces may refer to:

- List of countries by number of military and paramilitary personnel
- List of countries by military expenditures
- List of countries by level of military equipment
