= Dzięciołowo =

Dzięciołowo can refer to:

- Dzięciołowo, Podlaskie Voivodeship
- Dzięciołowo, West Pomeranian Voivodeship
