= Sławomierz =

- Settlement
- Location within Poland
- Coordinates: 53°53′32″N 16°6′18″E
- Country: Poland
- Voivodeship: West Pomeranian
- County: Białogard
- Gmina: Tychowo

Sławomierz [swaˈvɔmjɛʂ] (German: Karlshof) is a settlement in the administrative district of Gmina Tychowo, within Białogard County, West Pomeranian Voivodeship, in north-western Poland. It lies approximately 12 km (7 mi) west of Tychowo, 15 km (9 mi) south-east of Białogard, and 114 km (71 mi) north-east of the regional capital Szczecin.

For the history of the region, see History of Pomerania.
