= Buczki, West Pomeranian Voivodeship =

Buczki
- Settlement
- Location within Poland
- Coordinates: 54°0′19″N 16°19′12″E
- Country: Poland
- Voivodeship: West Pomeranian
- County: Białogard
- Gmina: Tychowo

Buczki [ˈbut͡ʂki] (German: Schönfelde) is a settlement in the administrative district of Gmina Tychowo, within Białogard County, West Pomeranian Voivodeship, in north-western Poland. It lies approximately 10 km (6 mi) north-east of Tychowo, 23 km (14 mi) east of Białogard, and 132 km (82 mi) north-east of the regional capital Szczecin. For the history of the region, see History of Pomerania.
