= Dobel (disambiguation) =

Dobel is a municipality in the district of Calw in Baden-Württemberg, Germany.

Dobel may also refer to:

- Dobel language, Indonesia
- Maestro Dobel Tequila
- Döbel, German name of Doble, Poland
- Frieda Hackhe-Döbel, German politician

== See also ==
- Dobele (disambiguation)
- Döbelius
- Döbeln
