= Stare Dębno =

- Village
- Location within Poland
- Coordinates: 53°51′50″N 16°10′13″E
- Country: Poland
- Voivodeship: West Pomeranian
- County: Białogard
- Gmina: Tychowo
- Population: 220

Stare Dębno [ˈstarɛ ˈdɛmbnɔ] (German Damen) is a village in the administrative district of Gmina Tychowo, within Białogard County, West Pomeranian Voivodeship, in north-western Poland. It lies approximately 10 km (6 mi) south-west of Tychowo, 20 km (12 mi) south-east of Białogard, and 116 km (72 mi) north-east of the regional capital Szczecin.

The village has a population of 220.
