= Liśnica =

- Village
- Location within Poland
- Coordinates: 53°54′21″N 16°11′31″E
- Country: Poland
- Voivodeship: West Pomeranian
- County: Białogard
- Gmina: Tychowo
- Population: 70

Liśnica [liɕˈnit͡sa] (German: Augustenhof) is a village in the administrative district of Gmina Tychowo, within Białogard County, West Pomeranian Voivodeship, in north-western Poland. It lies approximately 6 km (4 mi) south-west of Tychowo, 18 km (11 mi) south-east of Białogard, and 120 km (75 mi) north-east of the regional capital Szczecin.

For the history of the region, see History of Pomerania.

The village has a population of 70.
