= Ujazd =

Ujazd may refer to the following towns in Poland:

- Ujazd, Gniezno County in Greater Poland Voivodeship (west-central Poland)
- Ujazd, Gmina Kamieniec, Grodzisk County in Greater Poland Voivodeship (west-central Poland)
- Ujazd, Kuyavian-Pomeranian Voivodeship (north-central Poland)
- Ujazd, Bochnia County in Lesser Poland Voivodeship (south Poland)
- Ujazd, Kraków County in Lesser Poland Voivodeship (south Poland)
- Ujazd, Poddębice County in Łódź Voivodeship (central Poland)
- Ujazd, Tomaszów County in Łódź Voivodeship (central Poland)
- Ujazd, Lower Silesian Voivodeship (south-west Poland)
- Ujazd, Zgorzelec in Lower Silesian Voivodeship (south-west Poland)
- Ujazd, Opole Voivodeship (south Poland)
- Ujazd, Podkarpackie Voivodeship (south-east Poland)
- Ujazd, Świętokrzyskie Voivodeship (south-central Poland)
- Ujazd, Białogard County in West Pomeranian Voivodeship (north-west Poland)
- Ujazd, Koszalin County in West Pomeranian Voivodeship (north-west Poland)
- Ujazd, Polish name for Uhyst (east Germany)
- Zgorzelec railway station, sometimes referred to as "Ujazd"
