= Warnino, Białogard County =

Warnino
- Village
- Location within Poland
- Coordinates: 53°56′59″N 16°20′46″E
- Country: Poland
- Voivodeship: West Pomeranian
- County: Białogard
- Gmina: Tychowo

Warnino [varˈninɔ] (German Warnin) is a village in the administrative district of Gmina Tychowo, within Białogard County, West Pomeranian Voivodeship, in north-western Poland. It lies approximately 6 km (4 mi) east of Tychowo, 25 km (16 mi) east of Białogard, and 131 km (81 mi) north-east of the regional capital Szczecin.

For the history of the region, see History of Pomerania.
