= Radzewo =

Radzewo may refer to the following places:

- Radzewo, Greater Poland Voivodeship (west-central Poland)
- Radzewo, Białogard County in West Pomeranian Voivodeship (north-west Poland)
- Radzewo, Szczecinek County in West Pomeranian Voivodeship (north-west Poland)
