= Gizalki =

Gizalki may refer to the following places in Poland:

- Gizałki, Greater Poland Voivodeship
- Giżałki, West Pomeranian Voivodeship
