= Rozłazino, West Pomeranian Voivodeship =

Rozłazino
- Settlement
- Location within Poland
- Coordinates: 53°55′41″N 16°7′12″E
- Country: Poland
- Voivodeship: West Pomeranian
- County: Białogard
- Gmina: Tychowo

Rozłazino [rɔzwaˈʑinɔ] (German: Heinrichshain) is a settlement in the administrative district of Gmina Tychowo, within Białogard County, West Pomeranian Voivodeship, in north-western Poland. It lies approximately 10 km (6 mi) west of Tychowo, 12 km (7 mi) south-east of Białogard, and 117 km (73 mi) north-east of the regional capital Szczecin.

For the history of the region, see History of Pomerania.
