= Nowe Dębno =

- Settlement
- Location within Poland
- Coordinates: 53°50′46″N 16°12′36″E
- Country: Poland
- Voivodeship: West Pomeranian
- County: Białogard
- Gmina: Tychowo

Nowe Dębno [ˈnɔvɛ ˈdɛmbnɔ] is a settlement in the administrative district of Gmina Tychowo, within Białogard County, West Pomeranian Voivodeship, in north-western Poland. It lies approximately 10 km (6 mi) south of Tychowo, 23 km (14 mi) south-east of Białogard, and 118 km (73 mi) north-east of the regional capital Szczecin.

For the history of the region, see History of Pomerania.
