= Trzebiszyn, West Pomeranian Voivodeship =

Trzebiszyn
- Village
- Location within Poland
- Coordinates: 53°56′N 16°14′E
- Country: Poland
- Voivodeship: West Pomeranian
- County: Białogard
- Gmina: Tychowo
- Population: 100

Trzebiszyn [tʂɛˈbiʂɨn] (German: Johannsberg) is a village in the administrative district of Gmina Tychowo, within Białogard County, West Pomeranian Voivodeship, in north-western Poland. It lies approximately 2 km (1 mi) west of Tychowo, 18 km (11 mi) south-east of Białogard, and 123 km (76 mi) north-east of the regional capital Szczecin.

For the history of the region, see History of Pomerania.

The village has a population of 100.
