= Borzysław-Kolonia =

- Settlement
- Location within Poland
- Coordinates: 53°55′4″N 16°11′6″E
- Country: Poland
- Voivodeship: West Pomeranian
- County: Białogard
- Gmina: Tychowo

Borzysław-Kolonia [bɔˈʐɨswaf kɔˈlɔɲa] is a settlement in the administrative district of Gmina Tychowo, within Białogard County, West Pomeranian Voivodeship, in north-western Poland. It lies approximately 6 km (4 mi) west of Tychowo, 17 km (11 mi) south-east of Białogard, and 120 km (75 mi) north-east of the regional capital Szczecin.
