= Doble =

Doble may refer to:

== People named Doble ==
- Abner Doble, proprietor of the Doble Steam Motor Corporation
- Rev. Gilbert Hunter Doble, hagiographer of Cornish Saints
- Sam Doble, rugby union full back

== Other ==
- Doble, Poland
- Doble Steam Car, produced by Abner Doble
- Paso Doble, a style of dance
- Doble baston, a form of martial art, using two sticks
- Smeargle, a Pokémon species named "Doble" in original Japanese language versions
