= Rudno, West Pomeranian Voivodeship =

Rudno
- Village
- Location within Poland
- Coordinates: 53°50′32″N 16°10′15″E
- Country: Poland
- Voivodeship: West Pomeranian
- County: Białogard
- Gmina: Tychowo
- Population: 40

Rudno [ˈrudnɔ] is a village in the administrative district of Gmina Tychowo, within Białogard County, West Pomeranian Voivodeship, in north-western Poland. It lies approximately 12 km (7 mi) south-west of Tychowo, 22 km (14 mi) south-east of Białogard, and 115 km (71 mi) north-east of the regional capital Szczecin.

For the history of the region, see History of Pomerania. The village has a population of 40.
