= Czarnkowo =

Czarnkowo may refer to the following places:

- Czarnkowo, Bytów County in Pomeranian Voivodeship (north Poland)
- Czarnkowo, Białogard County in West Pomeranian Voivodeship (north-west Poland)
- Czarnkowo, Stargard County in West Pomeranian Voivodeship (north-west Poland)
