= Wełdkowo =

- Village
- Location within Poland
- Coordinates: 53°57′28″N 16°24′14″E
- Country: Poland
- Voivodeship: West Pomeranian
- County: Białogard
- Gmina: Tychowo
- Population: 40

Wełdkowo [vɛu̯tˈkɔvɔ] (German: Groß Voldekow) is a village in the administrative district of Gmina Tychowo, within Białogard County, West Pomeranian Voivodeship, in north-western Poland. It lies approximately 10 km (6 mi) east of Tychowo, 28 km (17 mi) east of Białogard, and 135 km (84 mi) north-east of the regional capital Szczecin.

For the history of the region, see History of Pomerania.

The village has a population of 40.
