= Słonino =

- Village
- Location within Poland
- Coordinates: 54°0′N 16°10′E
- Country: Poland
- Voivodeship: West Pomeranian
- County: Białogard
- Gmina: Tychowo

Słonino [swɔˈninɔ] (German Schlennin) is a village in the administrative district of Gmina Tychowo, within Białogard County, West Pomeranian Voivodeship, in north-western Poland. It lies approximately 10 km (6 mi) north-west of Tychowo, 12 km (7 mi) east of Białogard, and 123 km (76 mi) north-east of the regional capital Szczecin.

For the history of the region, see History of Pomerania.
