= Trzebiec =

- Village
- Location within Poland
- Coordinates: 53°53′12″N 16°9′40″E
- Country: Poland
- Voivodeship: West Pomeranian
- County: Białogard
- Gmina: Tychowo
- Population (approx.): 90

Trzebiec [ˈtʂɛbjɛt͡s] (German: NEuhof) is a village in the administrative district of Gmina Tychowo, within Białogard County, West Pomeranian Voivodeship, in north-western Poland. It lies approximately 9 km (6 mi) south-west of Tychowo, 18 km (11 mi) south-east of Białogard, and 117 km (73 mi) north-east of the regional capital Szczecin.

The village has an approximate population of 90.

== See also ==
- History of Pomerania
