= Skarzewice =

- Settlement
- Location within Poland
- Coordinates: 53°58′12″N 16°9′0″E
- Country: Poland
- Voivodeship: West Pomeranian
- County: Białogard
- Gmina: Tychowo

Skarzewice [skaʐɛˈvit͡sɛ] (German: Rosalienhof) is a settlement in the administrative district of Gmina Tychowo, within Białogard County, West Pomeranian Voivodeship, in north-western Poland. It lies approximately 9 km (6 mi) north-west of Tychowo, 12 km (7 mi) east of Białogard, and 121 km (75 mi) north-east of the regional capital Szczecin.

For the history of the region, see History of Pomerania.
