= Tyczewo =

- Village
- Location within Poland
- Coordinates: 53°58′N 16°19′E
- Country: Poland
- Voivodeship: West Pomeranian
- County: Białogard
- Gmina: Tychowo
- Population: 48

Tyczewo [tɨˈt͡ʂɛvɔ] (German Tietzow) is a village in the administrative district of Gmina Tychowo, within Białogard County, West Pomeranian Voivodeship, in north-western Poland. It lies approximately 6 km (4 mi) north-east of Tychowo, 23 km (14 mi) east of Białogard, and 130 km (81 mi) north-east of the regional capital Szczecin.

For the history of the region, see History of Pomerania.
