= Drzonowo Białogardzkie =

- Village
- Location within Poland
- Coordinates: 53°53′58″N 16°19′0″E
- Country: Poland
- Voivodeship: West Pomeranian
- County: Białogard
- Gmina: Tychowo

Drzonowo Białogardzkie [dʐɔˈnɔvɔ bjawɔˈɡart͡skʲɛ] (German: Drenow) is a village in the administrative district of Gmina Tychowo, within Białogard County, West Pomeranian Voivodeship, in north-western Poland. It lies approximately 6 km (4 mi) south-east of Tychowo, 25 km (16 mi) south-east of Białogard, and 127 km (79 mi) north-east of the regional capital Szczecin.

For the history of the region, see History of Pomerania.
