= Dobrochy, West Pomeranian Voivodeship =

Dobrochy
- Settlement
- Location within Poland
- Coordinates: 53°57′20″N 16°15′51″E
- Country: Poland
- Voivodeship: West Pomeranian
- County: Białogard
- Gmina: Tychowo

Dobrochy [dɔˈbrɔxɨ] (German: Marienhof) is a settlement in the administrative district of Gmina Tychowo, within Białogard County, West Pomeranian Voivodeship, in north-western Poland. It lies approximately 3 km (2 mi) north of Tychowo, 20 km (12 mi) east of Białogard, and 126 km (78 mi) north-east of the regional capital Szczecin.

For the history of the region, see History of Pomerania.
