= Radzewo, Białogard County =

Radzewo
- Settlement
- Location within Poland
- Coordinates: 53°54′57″N 16°10′18″E
- Country: Poland
- Voivodeship: West Pomeranian
- County: Białogard
- Gmina: Tychowo

Radzewo [raˈd͡zɛvɔ] (German: Louisenhof) is a settlement in the administrative district of Gmina Tychowo, within Białogard County, West Pomeranian Voivodeship, in north-western Poland. It lies approximately 7 km (4 mi) west of Tychowo, 16 km (10 mi) south-east of Białogard, and 119 km (74 mi) north-east of the regional capital Szczecin.

For the history of the region, see History of Pomerania.
