= List of countries by level of military equipment =

This is a list of countries by level of military equipment, including naval ships, fighter aircraft and nuclear weapons. This list is indicative only, as strict comparisons cannot accurately be made.

== List ==

Countries (Note: All data apart from the number of nuclear weapons is taken from The Military Balance (2020).)	Military budget (US$ bn) (Note: Budget is annual.)		Main battle tanks	Aircraft carriers	AWS	Cruisers	Destroyers	Frigates	Corvettes	Nuclear submarines	Non-nuclear submarines	Combat aircraft (Note: Fixed-wing aircraft with combat capability.)	Attack helicopters (Note: Includes helicopters that have some attacking capabilities i.e. 'multi-role helicopters'.)	Nuclear weapons	Military satellites	Sources
Afghanistan	2	.01	0	0	0	0	0	0	0	0	0	0	0	0	0	
Albania	0	.425	40	0	0	0	0	0	0	0	0	0	0	0	0	
Algeria	24	.00	1632	0	3	0	0	8	16	0	6	102	75	0	0	
Angola	1	.04	310	0	0	0	0	0	0	0	0	89	56	0	0	
Antigua and Barbuda	0	.00759	0	0	0	0	0	0	0	0	0	0	0	0	0	
Argentina	2	.91	348	0	0	0	1	4	7	0	1	32	0	0	0	
Armenia (Note: Pre-war figures)	1	.7	221	0	0	0	0	0	0	0	0	16	7	0	0	
Australia	38	.8	59	0	3	0	3	7	0	0	6	84	45	TC	1	
Austria	3	.47	58	0	0	0	0	0	0	0	0	15	0	TC	0	
Azerbaijan (Note: Pre-war figures)	5	.1	920	0	3	0	0	0	1	0	0	31	26	0	0	
Bahamas	0	.0923	0	0	0	0	0	0	0	0	0	0	0	0	0	
Bahrain	1	.41	180	0	0	0	0	1	0	0	0	17	28	0	0	
Bangladesh	4	.06	320	0	1	0	0	7	6	0	2	58	0	0	0	
Barbados	0	.0424	0	0	0	0	0	0	0	0	0	0	0	0	0	
Belarus	0	.650	517	0	0	0	0	0	0	0	0	105	21	0	0	
Belgium	13	.7	0	0	0	0	0	2	0	0	0	44	14	(Note: See: NATO nuclear sharing)	0	
Belize	0	.0233	0	0	0	0	0	0	0	0	0	0	0	0	0	
Benin	0	.0683	0	0	0	0	0	0	0	0	0	0	0	0	0	
Bolivia	0	.4794	54	0	0	0	0	0	0	0	0	0	7	0	0	
Bosnia and Herzegovina	0	.167	91	0	0	0	0	0	0	0	0	0	13	0	0	
Botswana	0	.537	0	0	0	0	0	0	0	0	0	11	6	0	0	
Brazil	22	.9	469	0	4	0	0	8	1	0	5	128	12	TC	1	
Brunei	0	.437	0	0	0	0	0	0	4	0	0	0	0	0	0	
Bulgaria	2	.07	215	0	0	0	0	3	1	0	0	19	13	0	0	
Burkina Faso	0	.361	0	0	0	0	0	0	0	0	0	3	5	0	0	
Burundi	0	.0617	20	0	0	0	0	0	0	0	0	0	4	0	0	
Cambodia	1		0	0	0	0	0	0	0	0	0	0	13	0	0	
Cameroon	0	.424	0	0	0	0	0	0	0	0	0	6	14	0	0	
Canada	43	.8	74	0	0	0	0	12	0	0	4	86	0	0	4	
Cape Verde	0	.0115	0	0	0	0	0	0	0	0	0	0	0	0	0	
Central African Republic	0	.0389	0	0	0	0	0	0	0	0	0	0	>1	0	0	
Chad	0	.206	90	0	0	0	0	0	0	0	0	9	13	0	0	
Chile	4		270	0	4	0	0	8	0	0	4	57	0	0	1	
China	832-PPP		5000	3	57	10	52	54	72	12	47	1570	500	620	132	
Colombia	10	.4	0	0	0	0	0	10	4	0	4	55	28	0	0	
Costa Rica	0	.433	0	0	0	0	0	0	0	0	0	0	3	0	0	
Croatia	1	.12	78	0	0	0	0	0	0	0	0	11	0	0	0	
Cuba	—N/a		225	0	0	0	0	0	0	0	1	38	12	0	0	
Cyprus	0	.406	41	0	0	0	0	0	0	0	0	0	15	0	0	
Czech Republic	6	.8	65	0	0	0	0	0	0	0	0	28	17	0	0	
Ivory Coast	0	.898	10	0	0	0	0	0	0	0	0	0	4	0	0	
Democratic Republic of the Congo	0	.329	174	0	0	0	0	0	0	0	0	8	7	0	0	
Denmark	14	.3	44	0	0	0	3	2	0	0	0	34	0	0	0	
Djibouti	—N/a		0	0	0	0	0	0	0	0	0	0	7	0	0	
Dominican Republic	0	.621	10	0	0	0	0	0	0	0	0	8	0	0	0	
Ecuador	1	.55	55	0	0	0	0	2	6	0	2	9	0	0	0	
Egypt	11	.1	5340	2 (Helicopter)	4	0	0	13	7	0	8	426	152	0	1	
El Salvador	0	.172	0	0	0	0	0	0	0	0	0	13	0	0	0	
Equatorial Guinea	—N/a		0	0	0	0	0	1	1	0	0	4	5	0	0	
Eritrea	—N/a		1756	0	2	0	0	0	0	0	0	9	8	0	0	
Estonia	1	.5	0	0	0	0	0	0	0	0	0	0	3	0	0	
Ethiopia	0	.472	680	0	0	0	0	0	0	0	0	29	18	0	0	
Fiji	0	.0485	0	0	0	0	0	0	0	0	0	0	0	0	0	
Finland	8	.58	200	0	0	0	0	0	0	0	0	55	0	0	0	
France	70	.0	222	1	3	0	2	13	6	8	0	282	67	290	7	
Gabon	0	.269	0	0	0	0	0	0	0	0	0	6	4	0	0	
Gambia	—N/a		0	0	0	0	0	0	0	0	0	1	0	0	0	
Georgia	0	.288	235	0	0	0	0	0	0	0	0	10	6	0	0	
Germany	197-PPP		295	0	0	0	3	7	5	0	6	209	51		7	
Ghana	0	.233	0	0	0	0	0	0	0	0	0	8	10	0	0	
Greece	7	.67	1365	0	5	0	0	13	0	0	11	232	28	0	0	
Guatemala	0	.337	10	0	0	0	0	0	0	0	0	4	4	0	0	
Guinea	0	.191	0	0	0	0	0	0	0	0	0	3	9	0	0	
Guinea-Bissau	—N/a		10	0	0	0	0	0	0	0	0	0	0	0	0	
Guyana	0	.0678	0	0	0	0	0	0	0	0	0	0	1	0	0	
Haiti	0	.0139	0	0	0	0	0	0	0	0	0	0	0	0	0	
Honduras	0	.340	0	0	0	0	0	0	0	0	0	15	7	0	0	
Hungary	4	.8	208	0	0	0	0	0	0	0	0	14	8	0	0	
Iceland	0	.0551	0	0	0	0	0	0	0	0	0	0	0	0	0	
India	132	.0 PPP	4664	2	19	0	13	19	22	3	17	926	127	190	61	
Indonesia	21	.3	313	0	29	0	0	7	24	0	4	97	15	0	0	
Iran	23		1996	0	10	0	0	0	7	0	19	240	50	0	3	
Iraq	10	.3	848	0	0	0	0	0	0	0	0	68	35	0	0	
Ireland	1	.19	0	0	0	0	0	0	0	0	0	0	0	0	0	
Israel	46	.5	1370	0	0	0	0	0	7	0	5	340	43	90 (Note: Israel neither confirms nor denies possession of nuclear weapons.)	10	
Italy	48	.8	200	2	3	0	4	12	0	0	8	221	36		9	
Jamaica	0	.262	0	0	0	0	0	0	0	0	0	0	2	0	0	
Japan	62	.1 PPP	518	2	3	2	34	8	0	0	24	313	101	TC	11	
Jordan	1	.72	1365	0	0	0	0	0	0	0	0	63	29	0	0	
Kazakhstan	1	.44	300	0	0	0	0	0	0	0	0	126	32	0	0	
Kenya	1	.11	188	0	0	0	0	0	0	0	0	23	3	0	0	
Democratic People's Republic of Korea	—N/a		5845	0	10	0	0	2	5	0	71	572	0	30	0	
Republic of Korea	64	.2	2501	0	10	3	6	14	12	0	20	580	96	TC	0	
Kuwait	7	.76	368	0	0	0	0	0	0	0	0	40	16	0	0	
Kyrgyzstan	—N/a		215	0	0	0	0	0	0	0	0	4	2	0	0	
Laos	—N/a		130	0	0	0	0	0	0	0	0	4	0	0	1	
Latvia	1	.65	0	0	0	0	0	0	0	0	0	0	4	0	0	
Lebanon	1	.92	204	0	0	0	0	0	0	0	0	9	0	0	0	
Lesotho	0	.0432	?	0	0	0	0	0	0	0	0	0	3	0	0	
Liberia	0	.0187	0	0	0	0	0	0	0	0	0	0	0	0	0	
Libya	—N/a		300	0	1	0	0	1	0	0	0	20	1	0	0	
Lithuania	3	.6	0	0	0	0	0	0	0	0	0	0	0	0	0	
Luxembourg	0	.344	0	0	0	0	0	0	0	0	0	0	0	0	0	
North Macedonia	0	.188	31	0	0	0	0	0	0	0	0	0	10	0	0	
Madagascar	0	.0772	0	0	0	0	0	0	0	0	0	0	3	0	0	
Malawi	0	.0675	0	0	0	0	0	0	0	0	0	0	2	0	0	
Malaysia	9	.90	48	0	0	0	0	2	8	0	2	38	0	0	0	
Maldives	0	.1	0	0	0	0	0	0	0	0	0	4	0	0	0	
Mali	0	.727	0	0	0	0	0	0	0	0	0	13	4	0	0	
Malta	0	.0839	0	0	0	0	0	0	0	0	0	0	6	0	0	
Mauritania	0	.16	35	0	1	0	0	0	0	0	0	4	3	0	0	
Mauritius	0	.22	0	0	0	0	0	0	0	0	0	0	9	0	0	
Mexico	15	.65	0	0	4	0	0	1	0	0	0	68	0	TC	2	
Moldova	0	.0421	0	0	0	0	0	0	0	0	0	0	0	0	0	
Mongolia	0	.096	420	0	0	0	0	0	0	0	0	2	0	0	0	
Montenegro	0	.0743	0	0	0	0	0	0	0	0	0	0	13	0	0	
Morocco	5	.96	916	0	3	0	0	3	4	0	0	117	0	0	2	
Mozambique	0	.127	60	0	0	0	0	0	0	0	0	8	2	0	0	
Myanmar	2	.11	186	0	1	0	0	5	3	0	1	92	12	0	0	
Namibia	0	.422	2	0	0	0	0	0	0	0	0	9	7	0	0	
Nepal	0	.387	0	0	0	0	0	0	0	0	0	0	12	0	0	
Netherlands	28	.1	0	0	3	0	4	2	0	0	4	58	28		1	
New Zealand	2	.72	0	0	0	0	0	2	0	0	0	0	8	TC	0	
Nicaragua	0	.0784	147	0	0	0	0	0	0	0	0	0	7	0	0	
Niger	0	.176	0	0	0	0	0	0	0	0	0	2	7	0	0	
Nigeria	2	.57	317	0	0	0	0	1	1	0	0	38	16	0	0	
Norway	16	.4	52	0	0	0	0	4	0	0	6	40	0	0	0	
Oman	7	.48	117	0	1	0	0	3	2	0	0	56	0	0	0	
Pakistan	19	.6 PPP	2537	0	8	0	0	10	6	0	8	583	65	170	0	
Panama	0	.805	0	0	0	0	0	0	0	0	0	0	10	0	0	
Papua New Guinea	0	.0942	0	0	2	0	0	0	0	0	0	0	0	0	0	
Paraguay	0	.288	0	0	0	0	0	0	0	0	0	6	0	0	0	
Peru	2	.13	240	0	3	0	0	7	7	0	6	48	18	0	1	
Philippines	9	.93	0	0	17	0	0	4	1	0	0	39	38	0	0	
Poland	48	.7	808	0	5	0	0	2	1	0	3	109	28	TC	0	
Portugal	6	.39	37	0	0	0	0	5	2	0	2	25	0	0	0	
Qatar	15	.4	62	0	0	0	0	0	0	0	0	74	24	0	1	
Republic of the Congo	0	.301	41	0	0	0	0	0	0	0	0	2	2	0	0	
Romania	9	.3	377	0	0	0	0	3	4	0	0	49	0	TC	0	
Russia	461	.6 PPP	5750	1 (inactive)	20	4	7	12	81	28	21	1517	404	4400	109	
Rwanda	0	.127	34	0	0	0	0	0	0	0	0	0	5	0	0	
Saudi Arabia	75	.8	960	0	0	0	0	6	4	0	0	364	47	TC	0	
Senegal	0	.343	0	0	0	0	0	0	0	0	0	0	5	0	0	
Serbia	2	.1	265	0	0	0	0	0	0	0	0	30	26	0	0	
Seychelles	—N/a		0	0	0	0	0	0	0	0	0	0	0	0	0	
Sierra Leone	0	.0257	0	0	0	0	0	0	0	0	0	0	2	0	0	
Singapore	21	.8 PPP	97	0	4	0	0	6	8	0	4	100	19	0	0	
Slovakia	3	.09	45	0	0	0	0	0	0	0	0	24	0	0	0	
Slovenia	1	.51	46	0	0	0	0	0	0	0	0	0	8	0	0	
Somalia	—N/a		0	0	0	0	0	0	0	0	0	0	0	0	0	
South Africa	3	.24	157	0	0	0	0	4	0	0	2	26	11	TC	1	
South Sudan	0	.0701	81	0	0	0	0	0	0	0	0	0	14	0	0	
Spain	35	.6	327	1	2	0	5	6	0	0	2	152	24	0	3	
Sri Lanka	1	.59	62	0	1	0	0	1	0	0	0	5	11	0	0	
Sudan	—N/a		465	0	0	0	0	0	0	0	0	83	40	0	1	
Suriname	—N/a		0	0	0	0	0	0	0	0	0	0	3	0	0	
Sweden	15	.2	120	0	0	0	0	0	5	0	5	94	0	0	0	
Switzerland	9	.45	134	0	0	0	0	0	0	0	0	53	0	TC	0	
Syria	—N/a		11	0	3	0	0	0	1	0	0	226	20	0	0	
Republic of China (Taiwan)	36	.1 PPP	1110	0	9	0	4	21	11	0	4	346	96	0	1	(Note: Taiwan's political status is disputed.)
Tajikistan	0	.187	37	0	0	0	0	0	0	0	0	0	4	0	0	
Tanzania	0	.827	45	0	0	0	0	0	0	0	0	14	1	0	0	
Thailand	11	.3	420	1 (Non Operational)	3	0	0	7	7	0	0	113	7	0	0	
Timor-Leste	0	.0443	0	0	0	0	0	0	0	0	0	0	0	0	0	
Togo	0	.107	2	0	0	0	0	0	0	0	0	11	4	0	0	
Trinidad and Tobago	0	.904	0	0	0	0	0	0	0	0	0	0	2	0	0	
Tunisia	1	.14	84	0	0	0	0	0	0	0	0	14	0	0	0	
Turkey	32	.5	4378	0	5	0	0	16	10	0	12	291	95		2	
Turkmenistan	—N/a		654	0	0	0	0	0	0	0	0	55	10	0	0	
Uganda	0	.547	240	0	0	0	0	0	0	0	0	10	9	0	0	
Ukraine	64	.8	1121	0	1	0	0	1	1	0	0	111	35	0	0	
United Arab Emirates	26	.9	353	0	2	0	0	0	7	0	0	155	28	0	3	
United Kingdom	94	.3	227	2	5	0	6	5	0	10	0	145	40	225	8	
United States	1330	(Note: Includes United States Coast Guard Budget.)	4650	11	42	5	78	27	0	68	0	3368	867	3700	141	
Uruguay	0	.442	15	0	0	0	0	2	0	0	0	7	4	0	0	
Uzbekistan	—N/a		340	0	0	0	0	0	0	0	0	83	33	0	0	
Venezuela	—N/a		173	0	4	0	0	2	0	0	1	71	9	0	1	
Vietnam	15	.7	1379	0	7	0	0	0	12	0	8	80	0	0	1	
Yemen	—N/a		5	0	0	0	0	0	0	0	0	78	0	0	0	
Zambia	0	.387	30	0	0	0	0	0	0	0	0	32	5	0	0	
Zimbabwe	0	.0389	40	0	0	0	0	0	0	0	0	20	6	0	0	
Total																

States marked 'TC' are widely considered technologically capable of wielding, operating or developing nuclear weapons, however are signatories of the Nuclear Non-Proliferation Treaty (NPT) and are not known to possess any at the current moment. Japan, South Korea and Poland are generally considered de facto nuclear states due to their believed ability to wield nuclear weapons within 1 to 3 years. South Africa produced six nuclear weapons in the 1980s, but dismantled them in the early 1990s. South Africa signed the NPT in 1991.

== Combat aircraft by country ==
Figures sourced from the Center for Strategic and International Studies and Flightglobal.com, unless otherwise noted.

Rank	Country	Fighters	Bombers	Attack	Total	Sources
1	United States (USAF, US Navy)	5,209	162	343	5,714	
2	Russia (Russian Air Force, Russian Naval Aviation)	862	181	548	1,591	
3	China (PLAAF, PLANAF)	922	160	276	1,358	
4	India (Indian Air Force, Indian Naval Air Arm)	646		227	873	
5	North Korea	484	40	154	678	
6	Pakistan	447		136	583	
7	Egypt	338		26	496	
8	South Korea	468			488	
9	Israel	426			426	
10	Japan	380			380	

Figures sourced from the Lowy Institute

Rank	Country	Navy VLS Cells	Sources
1	United States (US Navy)	9,620	
2	People's Republic of China (PRC Navy)	4,328	
3	Russia (Russian Navy)	1,672	
4	Japan (Japanese Navy)	1,448	
5	South Korea (South Korean Navy)	896	
6	India (Indian Navy)	696	
7	United Kingdom (Royal Navy)	448	
8	Singapore (Singapore Navy)	384	
9	Italy (Italian Navy)	304	
10	France (French Navy)	304	
11	Spain (Spanish Navy)	240	
12	Australia (Australian Navy)	208	
13	Canada (Canadian Navy)	192	

== See also ==
- List of countries by number of military and paramilitary personnel
- List of countries by military expenditures
- List of countries by military expenditure per capita
- List of countries by Global Militarization Index
- List of militaries by country

== Bibliography ==
- "Complex crises call for adaptable and durable capabilities". The Military Balance. 115 (1). Routledge: 5–8. February 10, 2015. doi:10.1080/04597222.2015.996334. ISSN 0459-7222.
- "Chapter Three: North America". The Military Balance. 115 (1). Routledge: 29–56. February 10, 2015. doi:10.1080/04597222.2015.996344. ISSN 0459-7222. S2CID 219626006.
- "Chapter Four: Europe". The Military Balance. 115 (1). Routledge: 57–158. February 10, 2015. doi:10.1080/04597222.2015.996348. ISSN 0459-7222. S2CID 219628714.
- "Chapter Five: Russia and Eurasia". The Military Balance. 115 (1). Routledge: 159–206. February 10, 2015. doi:10.1080/04597222.2015.996357. ISSN 0459-7222. S2CID 219626710.
- "Chapter Six: Asia". The Military Balance. 115 (1). Routledge: 207–302. February 10, 2015. doi:10.1080/04597222.2015.996361. ISSN 0459-7222. S2CID 219627108.
- "Chapter Seven: Middle East and North Africa". The Military Balance. 115 (1). Routledge: 303–362. February 10, 2015. doi:10.1080/04597222.2015.996362. ISSN 0459-7222. S2CID 219625386.
- "Chapter Eight: Latin America and the Caribbean". The Military Balance. 115 (1). Routledge: 363–420. February 10, 2015. doi:10.1080/04597222.2015.996364. ISSN 0459-7222. S2CID 219622733.
- "Chapter Nine: Sub-Saharan Africa". The Military Balance. 115 (1). Routledge: 421–480. February 10, 2015. doi:10.1080/04597222.2015.996365. ISSN 0459-7222. S2CID 219622458.
- Cordesman, Anthony H. (January 23, 2002). "Western Military Balance and Defense Efforts" (PDF). Center for Strategic and International Studies. Archived from the original (PDF) on October 29, 2005.
- Cordesman, Anthony H. (March 25, 2005). "The Middle East Military Balance: Definition, Regional Developments and Trends" (PDF). Center for Strategic and International Studies. Archived from the original (PDF) on October 29, 2005.
- Smith, Larry J., ed. (July 25, 2006). Condensed World Paramilitary Forces 2006 (PDF) (Report). Archived from the original (PDF) on March 27, 2009.
- "SIPRI Military Expenditure Database". Stockholm International Peace Research Institute.
- South African Navy official website
