= Solno, West Pomeranian Voivodeship =

Solno
- Settlement
- Location within Poland
- Coordinates: 53°59′3″N 16°18′5″E
- Country: Poland
- Voivodeship: West Pomeranian
- County: Białogard
- Gmina: Tychowo

Solno [ˈsɔlnɔ] is a settlement in the administrative district of Gmina Tychowo, within Białogard County, West Pomeranian Voivodeship, in north-western Poland. It lies approximately 7 km (4 mi) north-east of Tychowo, 21 km (13 mi) east of Białogard, and 130 km (81 mi) north-east of the regional capital Szczecin.

For the history of the region, see History of Pomerania.
