= Głuszyna, West Pomeranian Voivodeship =

Głuszyna
- Settlement
- Location within Poland
- Coordinates: 54°29′44″N 17°25′15″E
- Country: Poland
- Voivodeship: West Pomeranian
- County: Białogard
- Gmina: Tychowo

Głuszyna [ɡwuˈʂɨna] is a settlement in the administrative district of Gmina Tychowo, within Białogard County, West Pomeranian Voivodeship, in north-western Poland.

For the history of the region, see History of Pomerania.
