= Kikowo, West Pomeranian Voivodeship =

Kikowo
- Village
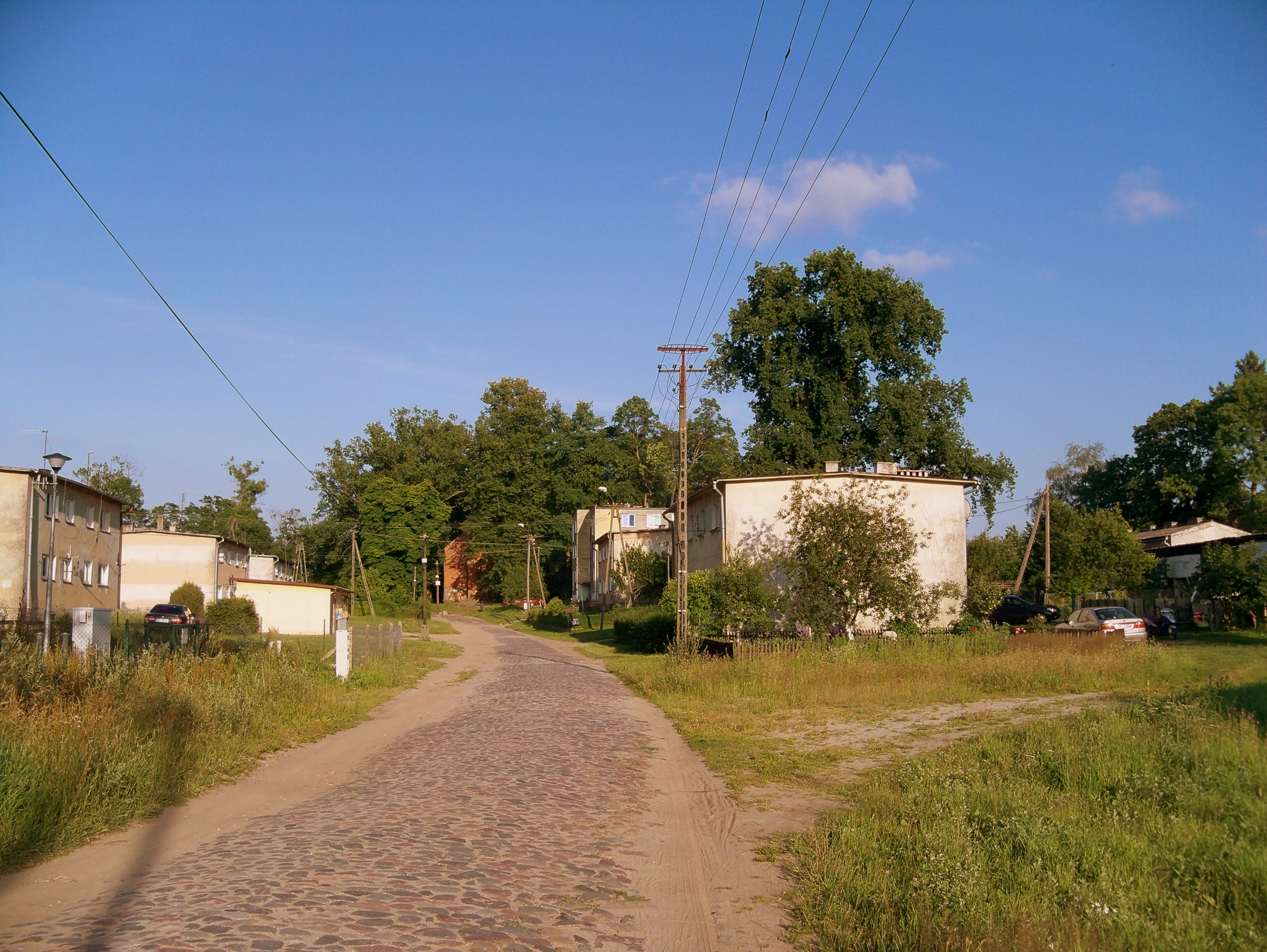
- Road in Kikowo

- Location within Poland
- Coordinates: 53°53′2″N 16°16′37″E
- Country: Poland
- Voivodeship: West Pomeranian
- County: Białogard
- Gmina: Tychowo
- Population: 220

Kikowo [kiˈkɔvɔ] (German: Kieckow) is a village in the administrative district of Gmina Tychowo, within Białogard County, West Pomeranian Voivodeship, in north-western Poland. It lies approximately 6 km (4 mi) south of Tychowo, 24 km (15 mi) south-east of Białogard, and 124 km (77 mi) north-east of the regional capital Szczecin.

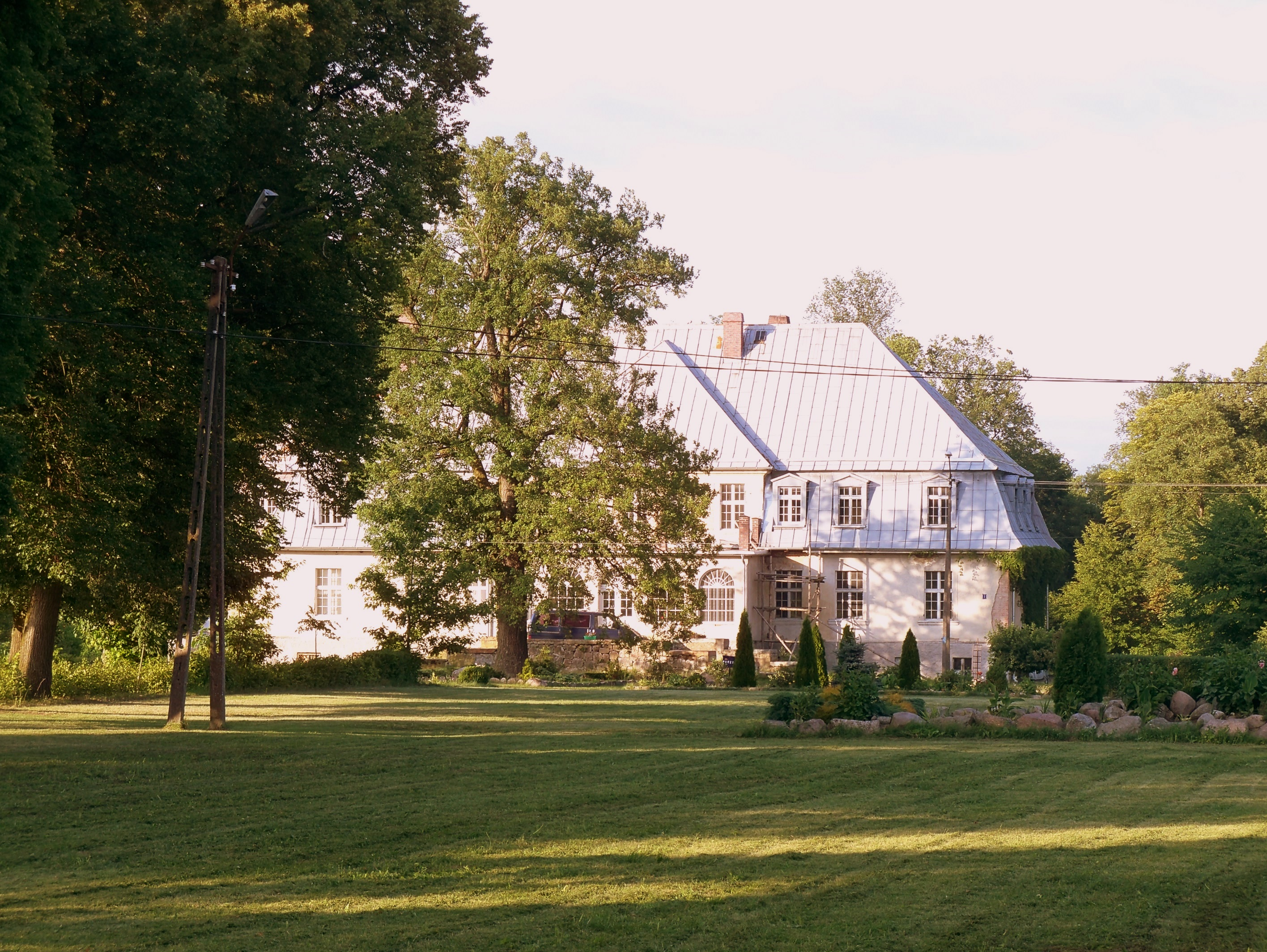
Palace Kieckow

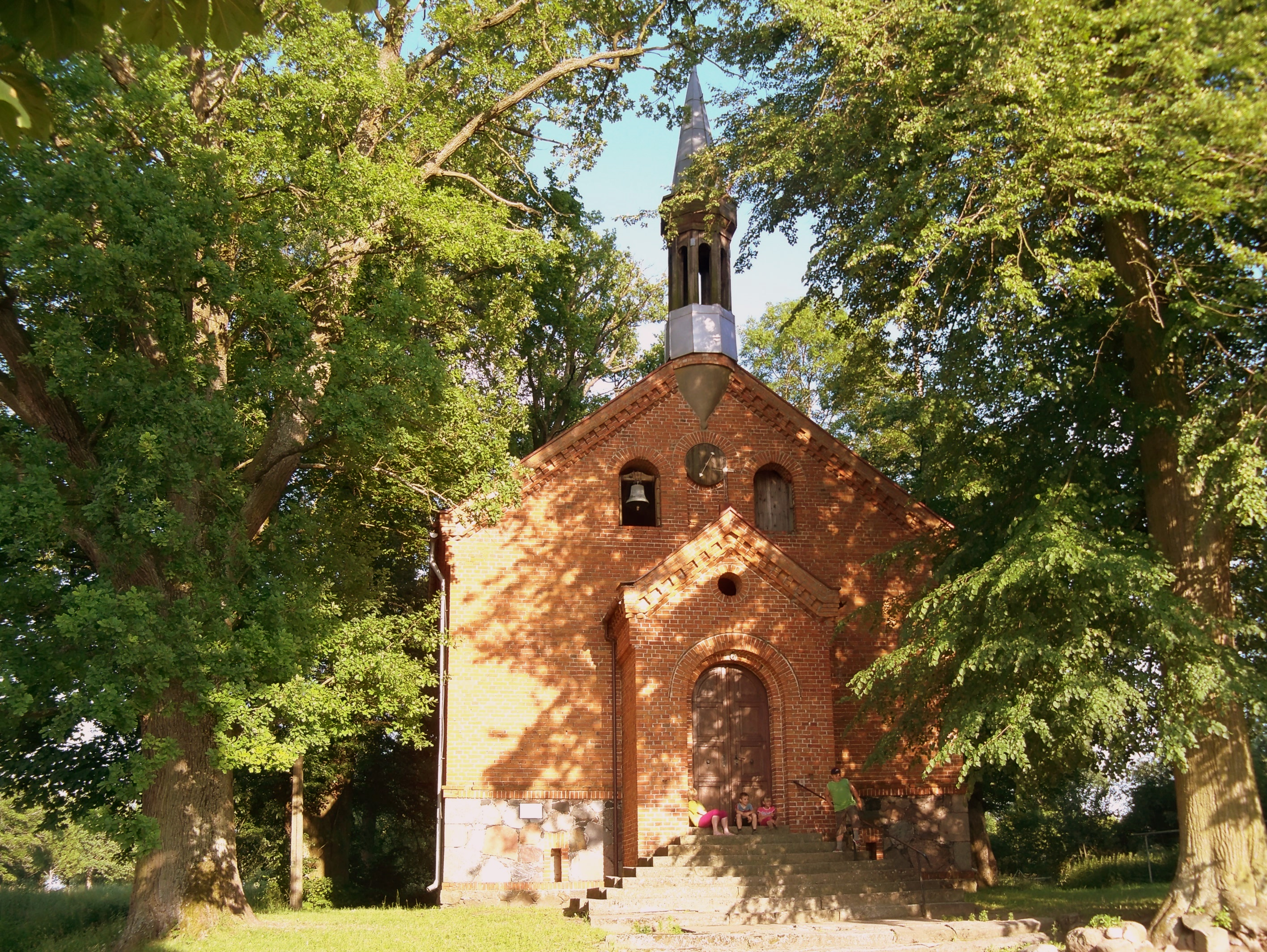
Church in Kieckow

For the history of the region, see History of Pomerania.

The village has a population of 220.

== People ==
- Hans Hugo von Kleist-Retzow (1814–1892), German politician
- Ruth von Kleist-Retzow (1867–1945), German nobility
