= Modrolas =

- Village
- Location within Poland
- Coordinates: 53°57′N 16°10′E
- Country: Poland
- Voivodeship: West Pomeranian
- County: Białogard
- Gmina: Tychowo

Modrolas [mɔˈdrɔlas] (German Mandelatz) is a village in the administrative district of Gmina Tychowo, within Białogard County, West Pomeranian Voivodeship, in north-western Poland. It lies approximately 7 km (4 mi) west of Tychowo, 14 km (9 mi) south-east of Białogard, and 120 km (75 mi) north-east of the regional capital Szczecin.

For the history of the region, see History of Pomerania.
