= Giżałki =

- Settlement
- Location within Poland
- Coordinates: 53°57′44″N 16°21′11″E
- Country: Poland
- Voivodeship: West Pomeranian
- County: Białogard
- Gmina: Tychowo

Giżałki [ɡiˈʐau̯ki] (German: Gissolk) is a settlement in the administrative district of Gmina Tychowo, within Białogard County, West Pomeranian Voivodeship, in north-western Poland. It lies approximately 8 km (5 mi) north-east of Tychowo, 25 km (16 mi) east of Białogard, and 132 km (82 mi) north-east of the regional capital Szczecin.

For the history of the region, see History of Pomerania.
