= Dzięciołowo, West Pomeranian Voivodeship =

Dzięciołowo
- Village
- Location within Poland
- Coordinates: 53°55′N 16°26′E
- Country: Poland
- Voivodeship: West Pomeranian
- County: Białogard
- Gmina: Tychowo

Dzięciołowo [d͡ʑɛnt͡ɕɔˈwɔvɔ] is a village in the administrative district of Gmina Tychowo, within Białogard County, West Pomeranian Voivodeship, in north-western Poland. It lies approximately 12 km (7 mi) east of Tychowo, 31 km (19 mi) east of Białogard, and 135 km (84 mi) north-east of the regional capital Szczecin.

For the history of the region, see History of Pomerania.
