= Dobele (disambiguation) =

Dobele is a town in Lithuania.

Dobele may also refer to:

== Places ==
- Dobele Castle
- Dobele county
- Dobele crater
- Dobele district
- Dobele Municipality
- Dobele Parish
- Dobele State Gymnasium
- Dobele Station

== Surname ==
- Anton Döbele (1910 – 1943), German Luftwaffe ace

== See also ==
- Dobel (disambiguation)
