= Motarzyn =

- Village
- Location within Poland
- Coordinates: 53°53′N 16°14′E
- Country: Poland
- Voivodeship: West Pomeranian
- County: Białogard
- Gmina: Tychowo
- Website: http://www.motarzyn.pl/

Motarzyn [mɔˈtaʐɨn] (German: Muttrin) is a village in the administrative district of Gmina Tychowo, within Białogard County, West Pomeranian Voivodeship, in north-western Poland. It lies approximately 6 km (4 mi) south of Tychowo, 21 km (13 mi) south-east of Białogard, and 121 km (75 mi) north-east of the regional capital Szczecin.

In 2008 the population of the village was just over 100.

== Notable residents ==
- Heinrich Beitzke (1798–1867), German historian

== See also ==
History of Pomerania
