= Retowo, West Pomeranian Voivodeship =

Retowo
- Village
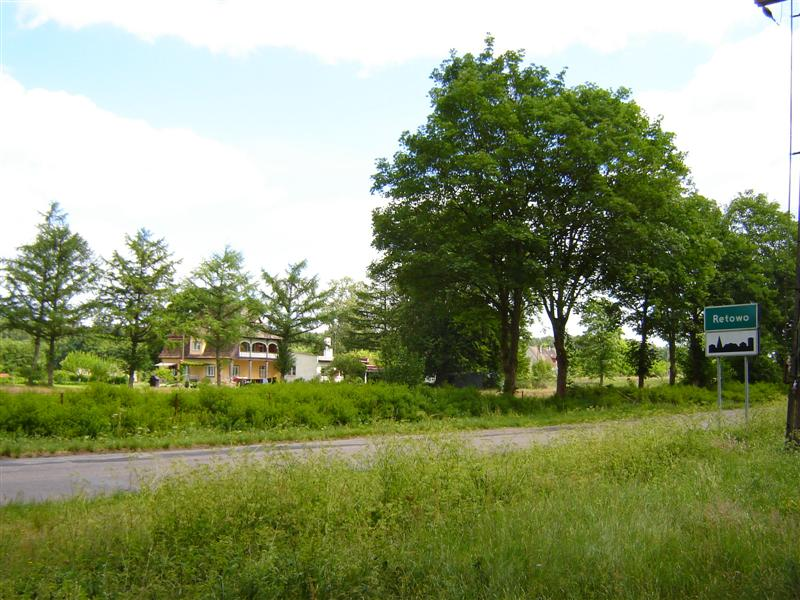

- Location within Poland
- Coordinates: 53°58′14″N 16°12′37″E
- Country: Poland
- Voivodeship: West Pomeranian
- County: Białogard
- Gmina: Tychowo

Retowo [rɛˈtɔvɔ] is a village in the administrative district of Gmina Tychowo, within Białogard County, West Pomeranian Voivodeship, in north-western Poland.

For the history of the region, see History of Pomerania.
