= Ewald-Heinrich von Kleist-Schmenzin =

German publisher (1922–2013)

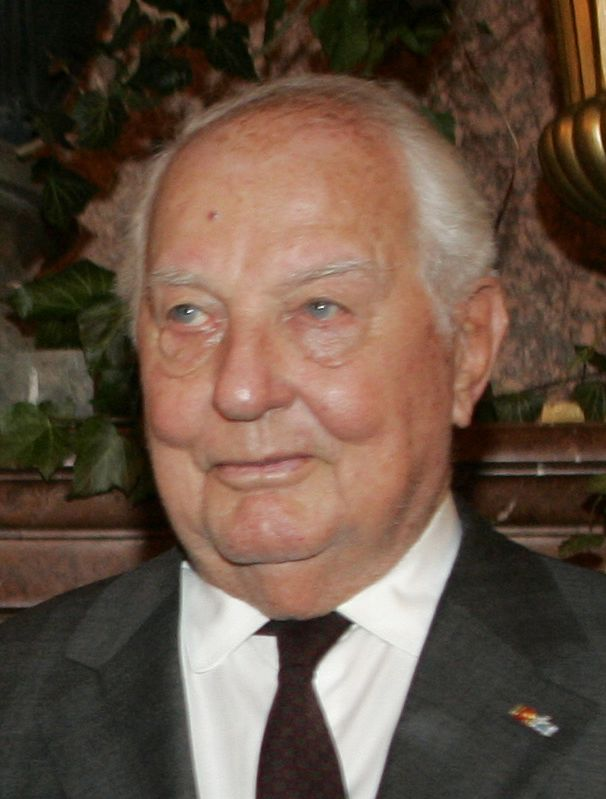
- Von Kleist-Schmenzin in 2009
- Born: 10 July 1922; Schmenzin, Province of Pomerania, German Reich (now Smęcino, Poland)
- Died: 8 March 2013 (aged 90); Munich, Germany
- Occupations: Wehrmacht Officer (1940–44); Publisher
- Spouse: Gundula von Kleist (1960–2013; his death)
- Parent: Ewald von Kleist-Schmenzin

Ewald-Heinrich Hermann Konrad Oskar Ulrich Wolf Alfred von Kleist-Schmenzin (10 July 1922 – 8 March 2013) was a German publisher and convenor of the Munich Conference on Security Policy until 1998. A member of the von Kleist family and an officer in the Wehrmacht during World War II, his parents were active in the German resistance against Adolf Hitler. Von Kleist was designated to kill Hitler in a suicide attack and was the last surviving member of the 20 July 1944 plot to assassinate Hitler.

== Early life ==
Von Kleist was born on the family's manor Gut Schmenzin at Schmenzin (Smęcino) near Köslin (now Koszalin, Poland) in Pomerania. The family was firmly monarchist, and his father, Ewald von Kleist-Schmenzin (1890–1945), had been an active opponent of Nazism well before the Second World War broke out. The young Ewald grew up in that milieu.

Like his father, who had criticised Nazi ideology in print as early as 1929, Ewald-Heinrich loathed Hitler and National Socialism from the beginning. The Nazi murders of 30 June 1934, the "Night of the Long Knives", further intensified young von Kleist's hatred of the Nazi régime.

== World War II ==
In 1940, at 18, he joined the Wehrmacht as an infantry officer. He served on the Eastern Front near Lake Ladoga and was wounded in July 1943. While recovering in Potsdam, von Kleist was personally recruited for the resistance by Claus Graf Schenk von Stauffenberg. In January 1944, with his father's blessing, he volunteered to replace the wounded Axel Freiherr von dem Bussche-Streithorst in another suicide assassination attempt on Hitler.

Von Kleist, the company leader, and his men were scheduled to show Hitler new uniforms, which had been tested at the front. Von Kleist planned to set off explosives hidden in his briefcase. He believed that he might have been able to escape alive, even if the briefcase exploded in his hands. However, like earlier attempts, the plan was not carried out, as Hitler kept putting off the scheduled uniform demonstration.

=== 20 July 1944 ===
Von Kleist, at 22, was the youngest of the many supporters and helpers at the Bendlerblock in Berlin who carried out an attempt on Hitler's life at the Wolf's Lair, near Rastenburg, in East Prussia on 20 July 1944. He was in the group that was to stage the coup in Berlin if the assassination had been successful. After its failure, he managed to cover up his resistance activities, and proceedings against him were dropped in December 1944 for lack of evidence. That spared him a trial before the Volksgerichtshof, which would almost certainly have ended with a death sentence, as it did for many of his fellow plotters, including his own father. However, he was imprisoned at the Ravensbrück concentration camp and then was sent to the front, where he remained until the war ended.

== Postwar ==
After the war he was left homeless when most of Pomerania was transferred to Poland and all of its Germans were expelled. Von Kleist went into the publishing business in West Germany and founded his own publishing house, the Ewald-von-Kleist-Verlag, which became a leading German publishing house. He joined the Protestant Order of Saint John (Bailiwick of Brandenburg) to which his executed father had belonged, and he was admitted as a Knight of Honour in 1957 and promoted to Knight of Justice in 1975.

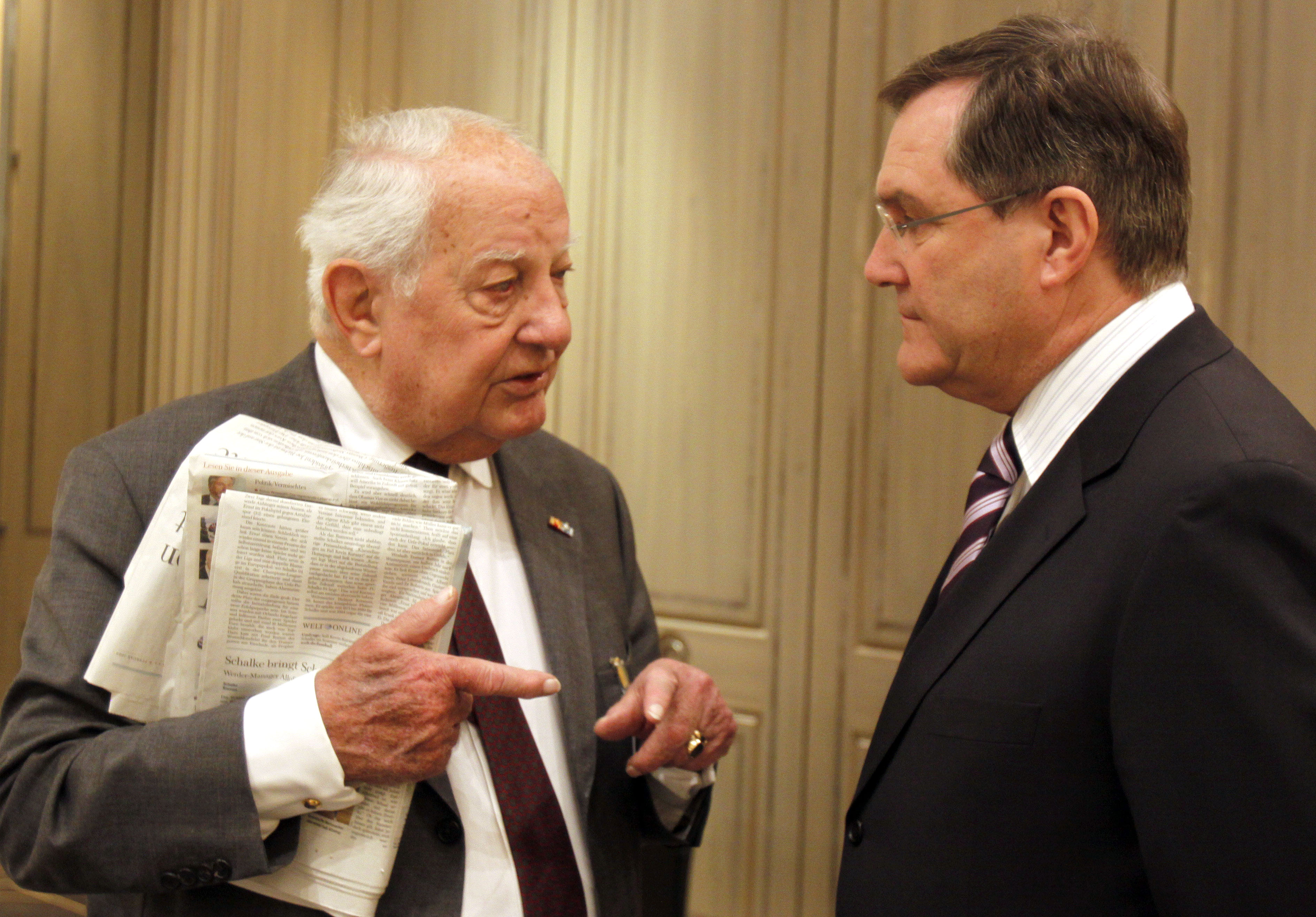
Von Kleist (left) with German Federal Minister of Defence Franz Josef Jung in 2009

In 1962, Von Kleist founded the Wehrkundetagung in Munich, the predecessor of the modern Munich Conference on Security Policy. He was the convenor of the conference until he retired in 1998. The forum was an important event during the Cold War and is now a forum for diplomats, politicians and defence personnel from around the world to debate international security issues.

In recognition of his services to strengthening transatlantic ties, Von Kleist was awarded the US Department of Defense Medal for Distinguished Public Service in 1991. When he retired from his role at the Munich conference in 1998, eight NATO Defence ministers attended the event to salute him.

Von Kleist remained active in German public life after the war and expressed his views openly on a variety of subjects, including the German armed forces and unilateral nuclear disarmament.

=== Death ===
Ewald-Heinrich von Kleist died at his home in Munich on 8 March 2013, at 90.

== In media ==
- Von Kleist-Schmenzin is an interviewee in the 1973 British documentary series The World at War.
- In the 2004 German production, Stauffenberg, von Kleist-Schmenzin is portrayed by actor Sebastian Rüger.

== See also ==
- Assassination attempts on Adolf Hitler
- Kleist family
