= Krosinko, West Pomeranian Voivodeship =

Krosinko
- Village
- Location within Poland
- Coordinates: 53°54′29″N 16°14′41″E
- Country: Poland
- Voivodeship: West Pomeranian
- County: Białogard
- Gmina: Tychowo
- Population: 100

Krosinko [krɔˈɕinkɔ] is a village in the administrative district of Gmina Tychowo, within Białogard County, West Pomeranian Voivodeship, in north-western Poland. It lies approximately 3 km (2 mi) south-west of Tychowo, 20 km (12 mi) south-east of Białogard, and 123 km (76 mi) north-east of the regional capital Szczecin.

For the history of the region, see History of Pomerania.

The village has a population of 100.
