= Czarnkowo, Białogard County =

Czarnkowo
- Village
- Location within Poland
- Coordinates: 53°55′15″N 16°20′20″E
- Country: Poland
- Voivodeship: West Pomeranian
- County: Białogard
- Gmina: Tychowo

Czarnkowo [t͡ʂarnˈkɔvɔ] (German: Zarnekow) is a village in the administrative district of Gmina Tychowo, within Białogard County, West Pomeranian Voivodeship, in north-western Poland. It lies approximately 6 km (4 mi) east of Tychowo, 25 km (16 mi) east of Białogard, and 129 km (80 mi) north-east of the regional capital Szczecin.

For the history of the region, see History of Pomerania.
