= Bąbnica =

- Settlement
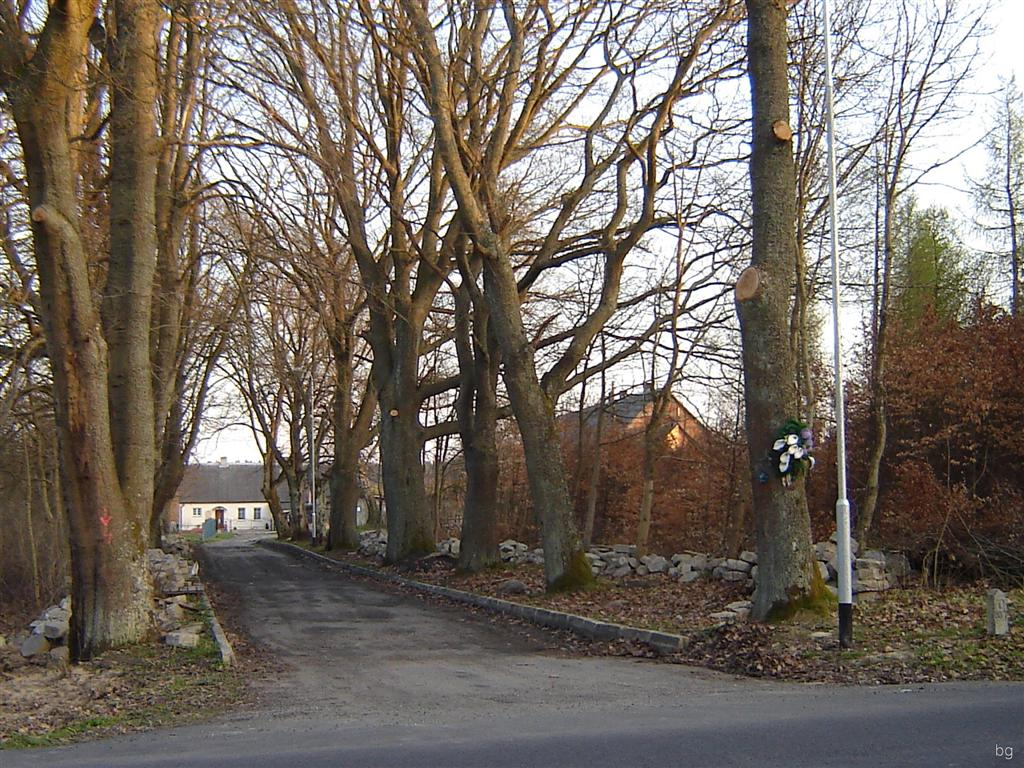
- Since January 1, 2007 Dębowa Street has been an integral part of Tychów.

- Coat of arms

- Location within Poland
- Coordinates: 53°55′42″N 16°15′29″E
- Country: Poland
- Voivodeship: West Pomeranian
- County: Białogard
- Gmina: Tychowo

Bąbnica [bɔmbˈnit͡sa] (German Bamnitz) is a settlement in the administrative district of Gmina Tychowo, within Białogard County, West Pomeranian Voivodeship, in north-western Poland.
