= Ujazd, Białogard County =

Ujazd
- Village
- Location within Poland
- Coordinates: 53°56′N 16°27′E
- Country: Poland
- Voivodeship: West Pomeranian
- County: Białogard
- Gmina: Tychowo

Ujazd [ˈujast] is a village in the administrative district of Gmina Tychowo, within Białogard County, West Pomeranian Voivodeship, in north-western Poland. It lies approximately 13 km (8 mi) east of Tychowo, 32 km (20 mi) east of Białogard, and 136 km (85 mi) north-east of the regional capital Szczecin.

For the history of the region, see History of Pomerania.
