= Heinrich Beitzke =

German politician and historian (1798–1867)

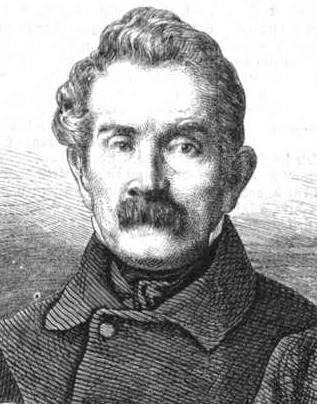
Heinrich Beitzke

Heinrich Beitzke (15 February 1798 – 10 May 1867 (Berlin) was a German politician and historian, born at Muttrin in the Prussian Province of Pomerania.

He served as a volunteer in the campaign of 1815, studied at the military schools of Coblenz and Mainz, entered the army as an officer in 1817, and retired in 1845 with the rank of major. In 1858 he was elected to the Prussian Chamber of Deputies. He published:

- Geschichte der deutschen Freiheitskriege in den Jahren 1813 und 1814 (three volumes, 1855 — an accurate and unprejudiced narrative, widely read)
- Geschichte des russischen Kriegs im Jahre 1812 (1856)
- Geschichte des Jahres 1815 (two volumes, 1865)
- Das preussische Heer vor und nach der Reorganisation (1867).
