= Doble, Poland =

Doble
- Village
- Location within Poland
- Coordinates: 53°51′N 16°14′E
- Country: Poland
- Voivodeship: West Pomeranian
- County: Białogard
- Gmina: Tychowo

Doble [ˈdɔblɛ] (German: Döbel) is a village in the administrative district of Gmina Tychowo, within Białogard County, West Pomeranian Voivodeship, in north-western Poland. It lies approximately 10 km (6 mi) south of Tychowo, 24 km (15 mi) south-east of Białogard, and 120 km (75 mi) north-east of the regional capital Szczecin.

For the history of the region, see History of Pomerania.
