= Gmina Tychowo =

Gmina Tychowo Tychowo Commune
- Gmina
- Coat of arms
- Interactive map of Gmina Tychowo
- Coordinates (Tychowo): 53°55′49″N 16°15′39″E
- Country: Poland
- Voivodeship: West Pomeranian
- County: Białogard
- Seat: Tychowo

Area
  - Total: 350.69 km^{2} (135.40 sq mi)

Population (2006)
  - Total: 6,976
  - Density: 19.89/km^{2} (51.52/sq mi)
- Website: http://www.tychowo.pl/

Gmina Tychowo is an urban-rural gmina (administrative district) in Białogard County, West Pomeranian Voivodeship, in north-western Poland. Its seat is the town of Tychowo, which lies approximately 20 kilometres (12 mi) south-east of Białogard and 125 km (78 mi) north-east of the regional capital Szczecin.

The gmina covers an area of 350.69 square kilometres (135.4 sq mi), and as of 2006 its total population is 6,976. Before 1 January 2010, when Tychowo became a town, the district was classed as a rural gmina.

== Villages ==
Apart from the town of Tychowo, the gmina contains the villages and settlements of Anin, Bąbnica, Borzysław, Borzysław-Kolonia, Buczki, Bukówko, Bukowo, Czarnkowo, Doble, Dobrochy, Dobrówko, Dobrowo, Drzonowo Białogardzkie, Dzięciołowo, Giżałki, Głuszyna, Kikowo, Kościanka, Kowalki, Krosinko, Liśnica, Modrolas, Motarzyn, Nowe Dębno, Osówko, Pobądz, Podborsko, Radzewo, Retowo, Rozłazino, Rudno, Sadkowo, Skarzewice, Sławomierz, Słonino, Smęcino, Solno, Stare Dębno, Trzebiec, Trzebiszyn, Tychówko, Tyczewo, Ujazd, Warnino, Wełdkówko, Wełdkowo, Wicewo, Zaspy Wielkie, Zastawa and Żukówek.

== Neighbouring gminas ==
Gmina Tychowo is bordered by the gminas of Barwice, Białogard, Bobolice, Grzmiąca, Połczyn-Zdrój and Świeszyno.
