= Johann Georg Leopold von Versen =

Johann Georg Leopold von Versen (Steinbusch, December 31, 1791 – Crampe, November 1, 1868), was a German soldier and nobleman.

== Career ==
He was the Lord of Klausdorf in the Grand Duchy of Mecklenburg-Schwerin and a Major of the Prussian Army.

== Marriage and children ==
He married firstly in Wurchow, on May 3, 1826, Hulda Wilhelmine Luise Henriette Leopoldine Ottilie von Glasenapp (Berlin, June 16, 1810 – Karlskau, September 25, 1843), and had issue, among whom a son Maximilian Felix Christoph Wilhelm Leopold Reinhold Albert Fürchtegott von Versen.
