= Borzysław, Białogard County =

Borzysław
- Village
- Location within Poland
- Coordinates: 53°55′37″N 16°12′6″E
- Country: Poland
- Voivodeship: West Pomeranian
- County: Białogard
- Gmina: Tychowo

Borzysław [bɔˈʐɨswaf] (German: Burzlaff) is a village in the administrative district of Gmina Tychowo, within Białogard County, West Pomeranian Voivodeship, in north-western Poland.
