= Templewo =

- Village
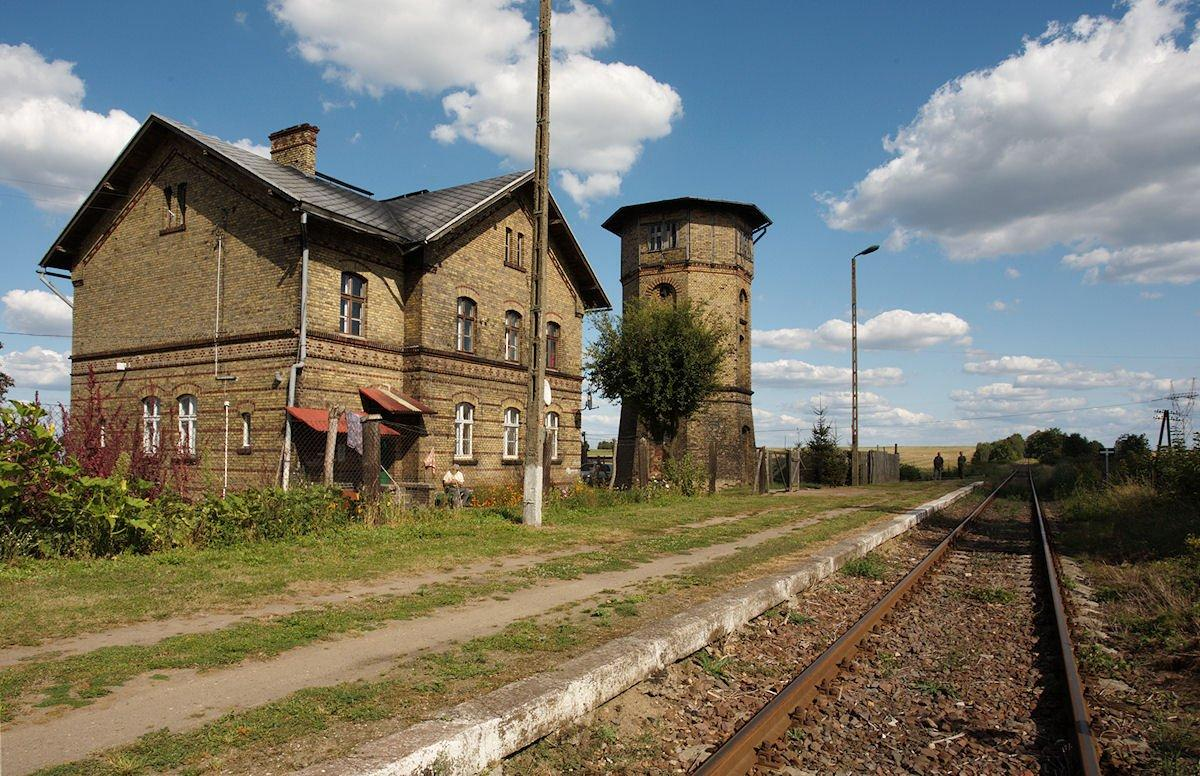
- Train station in Templewo

- Location within Poland
- Coordinates: 52°27′N 15°23′E
- Country: Poland
- Voivodeship: Lubusz
- County: Międzyrzecz
- Gmina: Bledzew
- Time zone: UTC+1 (CET)
  - Summer (DST): UTC+2 (CEST)
- Vehicle registration: FMI

Templewo [tɛmˈplɛvɔ] is a village in the administrative district of Gmina Bledzew, within Międzyrzecz County, Lubusz Voivodeship, in western Poland.

== History ==
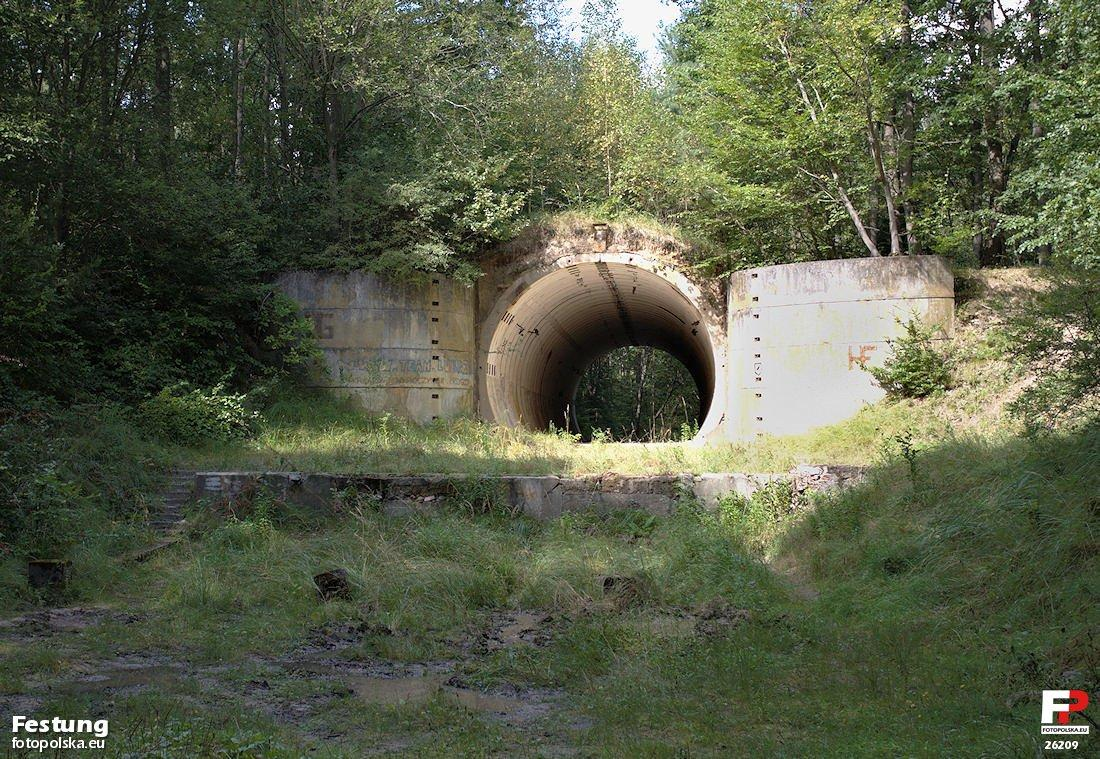
Tactical nuclear weapons silo in Templewo

Templewo was a private church village, administratively located in the Poznań County in the Poznań Voivodeship in the Greater Poland Province of the Kingdom of Poland.

Nearby the village are the remains of a Cold War Soviet military base with a tactical nuclear weapon silo.
