= Brzeźnica-Kolonia =

- Village
- Location within Poland
- Coordinates: 53°25′42″N 16°39′9″E
- Country: Poland
- Voivodeship: Greater Poland
- County: Złotów
- Gmina: Jastrowie
- Population: 200

Brzeźnica-Kolonia [bʐɛʑˈnit͡sa kɔˈlɔɲa] is a village in the administrative district of Gmina Jastrowie, within Złotów County, Greater Poland Voivodeship, in west-central Poland.

Before 1772, the area was part of Kingdom of Poland, 1772-1945 Prussia and Germany. For more on its history, see Złotów County.

Nearby the village are the remains of a Cold War Soviet nuclear military base.
