= Tychowo =

- Town
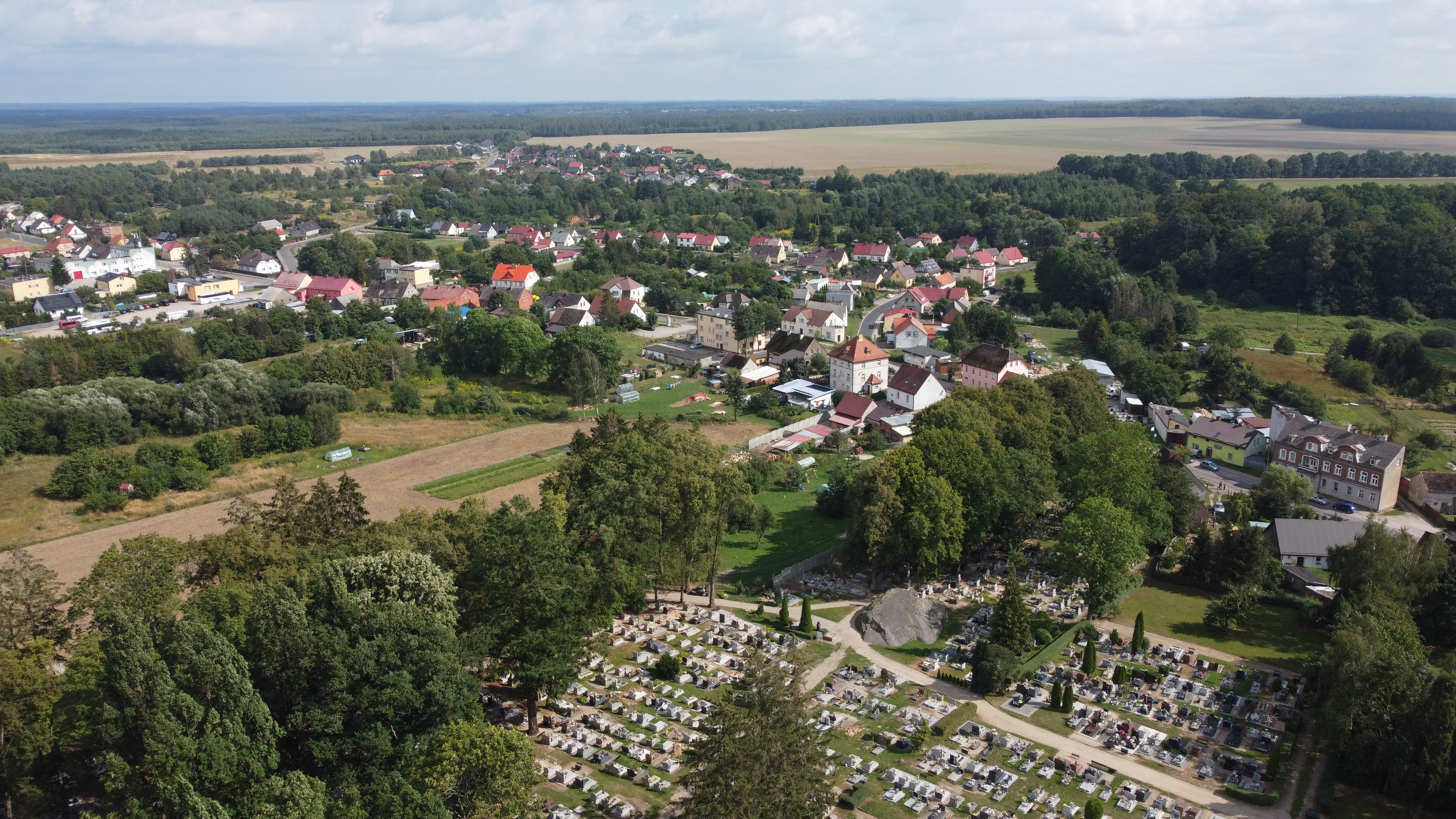
- Aerial view of Tychowo

- Coat of arms

- Location within Poland
- Coordinates: 53°55′49″N 16°15′39″E
- Country: Poland
- Voivodeship: West Pomeranian
- County: Białogard
- Gmina: Tychowo
- First mentioned: 1250
- Town rights: 2010

Population
  - Total: 2,500
- Time zone: UTC+1 (CET)
  - Summer (DST): UTC+2 (CEST)
- Website: http://www.tychowo.pl

Tychowo [tɨˈxɔvɔ] (Kashubian: Tëchòwò; German: Groß Tychow) is a town in Białogard County, West Pomeranian Voivodeship, in north-western Poland. It is the seat of the gmina (administrative district) called Gmina Tychowo. The town has an approximate population of 2,500.

Tychowo is a place with early medieval origins. It is known as the location of Trygław, the largest glacial erratic in Poland and one of the largest in Europe, and the location of a German-operated prisoner-of-war camp for Allied airmen of various nationalities during World War II.

== Geography ==
It lies approximately 20 km (12 mi) south-east of Białogard and 125 km (78 mi) north-east of the regional capital Szczecin. It is located in the historic region of Pomerania.

== History ==
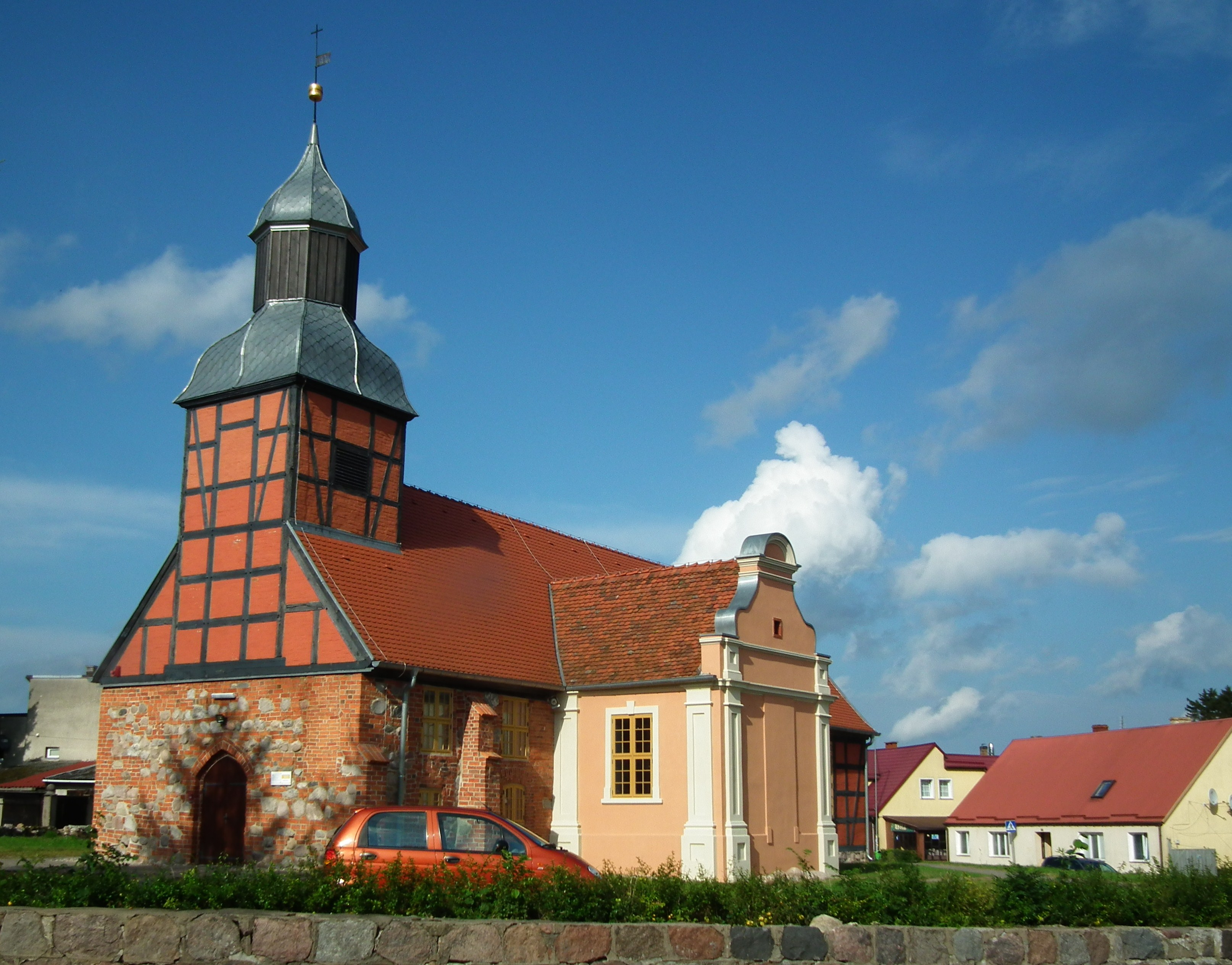
Timber-framed Our Lady of Perpetual Help church

Tychowo dates back to an early medieval Slavic settlement. The territory became part of the emerging Polish state under its first ruler Mieszko I around 967. From the 12th century it was part of the Duchy of Pomerania, which split off from Poland as a result of the fragmentation of Poland into smaller duchies. The oldest known mention of the village comes from 1250. In the 15th century, the timber-framed church was built.

From 1701 the village was part of the Kingdom of Prussia, and from 1871 to 1945 it was part of Germany. During World War II the Germans established the Stalag Luft IV prisoner-of-war camp. The prisoners were mainly Americans, but also the British, Canadians, Russians, Poles, Australians, New Zealanders, South Africans, Czechs, French and one Norwegian. In February 1945, a German-perpetrated death march of Allied prisoners-of-war from the Stalag XX-B POW camp passed through the settlement. After the war the region became part of Poland again according to the post-war Potsdam Agreement.

Tychowo was granted town rights in 2010.

== Sights ==
Among the town's sights are the 15th-century timber-framed church of Our Lady of Perpetual Help, a manor park, dating back to the 18th century, Trygław, i.e. the largest glacial erratic in Poland and one of the largest in Europe, listed as a natural monument, and the memorial to Allied prisoners-of-war of the Stalag Luft IV German World War II POW camp.

== Notable people ==
- Darius Kaiser (born 1961), Polish-born German racing cyclist
