= Białek =

Białek may refer to:

- Białek, Łódź Voivodeship
- Białek Mountain, a mountain in the Polish part of Śnieżnik Mountains
- Białek (surname)
