= Zernsdorf station =

Railway station in Königs Wusterhausen, Germany

Zernsdorf
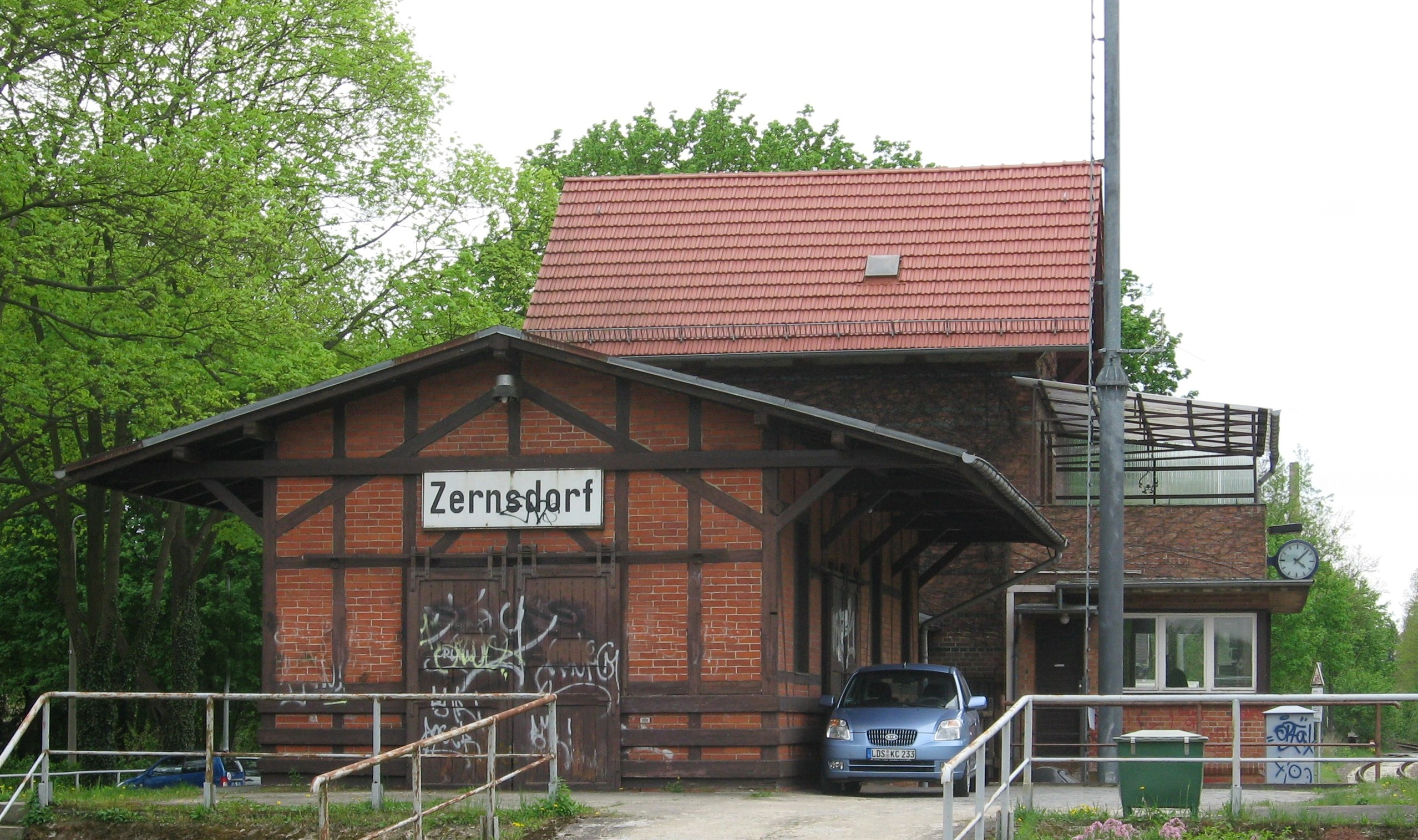
- 2010

General information
- Location: Bahnhofsweg/Bahnhofstraße; 15712 Königs Wusterhausen; Brandenburg; Germany
- Coordinates: 52.2993°N 13.6932°E
- Owner: DB Netz
- Operator: DB Station&Service
- Lines: Königs Wusterhausen–Grunow railway (KBS 209.36)
- Platforms: 1 island platform
- Tracks: 2
- Train operators: Niederbarnimer Eisenbahn

Other information
- Station code: 7005
- DS100 code: BZF
- IBNR: 8013392
- Category: 6
- Fare zone: VBB: Berlin C/5960
- Website: www.bahnhof.de

Services
Preceding station	Niederbarnimer Eisenbahn	Following station
Niederlehme towards Königs Wusterhausen	RB 36	Kablow towards Frankfurt (Oder)
Location
- Location within Brandenburg

Zernsdorf station is a railway station in the Zernsdorf district in the municipality of Königs Wusterhausen, located in the Dahme-Spreewald district in Brandenburg, Germany.
