= Mendel Grossman =

Polish photographer

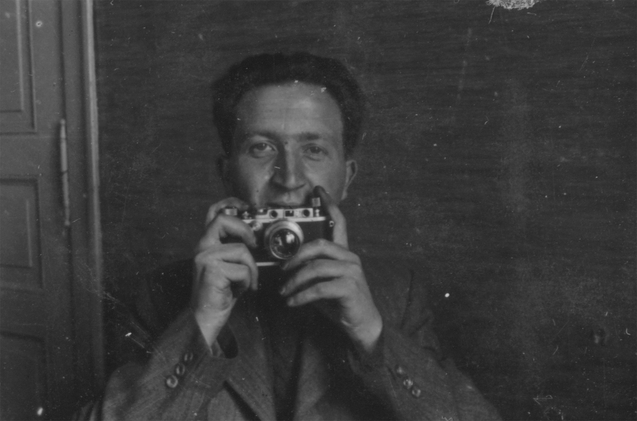
Mendel Grossman, self-portrait

Mordka Mendel Grossman was born on 27 June 1913 in Gorzkowice, Piotrków Governorate, Russian Empire (today Poland). He died on 30 April 1945, during the death marches. He was a photographer and worker in the Statistical Department of the Litzmannstadt Ghetto.

== Youth and job in Łódź (1918-1939) ==
He was born in Gorzkowice to a Jewish Hasidic family as a son of Szmul Dawid Grossman and Hanna. After the First World War his family settled in Łódź to Wschodnia street 58. In early youth he (as a child) began to draw portraits, as well as scenes from Jewish life. He started to take photographs, at first as an amateur, then as a professional. He himself colored pictures using aniline paints. In the 1930s he connected with the Jewish Theater in Łódź, picturing scenes of all the performed plays, as well as actors and actresses. He also knew numerous writers, poets, musicians and painters. Just before war's onset, Habima Theatre visited Łódź. Mendel was back stage, photographing the performances on his own initiative and directive. The results were the wonderfully inspired forerunner for all of his work in the ghettos and camps ~ Man in Motion ~ leading to the reverent archive of photos more aptly named as a collection ~ Motion Towards Death.

== The Litzmannstadt Ghetto (1939-1944) ==
The Nazis put him and his family in the Łódź Ghetto in 1939, where he found work as a photographer, making identification cards and documenting the work that his fellow inmates did in the ghetto. The Ghetto Government thought these photographs would convince the Nazis to treat them better because they were industrious. Grossman also hid a camera in his coat during the day, taking photographs of the living conditions in the ghetto. He took these photographs at great risk to his life, not only because the Gestapo suspected him, but also because of his weak heart. Some of his photographs assisted people in identifying the graves of their loved ones. M. Grossman's negatives are now the prepared documentation of the Holocaust. Grossman distributed many of his photographs; those he was unable to distribute, he tried to hide. In August 1944, shortly before the final liquidation of the Litzmannstadt Ghetto, he hid ca. 10,000 negatives showing scenes from the Ghetto. In the ghetto, he lived together with his family at 55 Marynarskiej street.

== Death ==
Deported to a labor camp in Koenigs Wusterhausen, he stayed there until 16 April 1945. Ill and exhausted, he was shot by Nazis during a forced death march, still holding on to his camera.

== M. M. Grossman's pictures from the Litzmannstadt Ghetto ==
Grossman's sister found some of his hidden photographs and took them to Israel, but they were mostly lost in the 1948 Arab–Israeli War. Other photos taken by Grossman were found by one of his friends, Nachman (Natek) Zonabend; these photographs are now located in the Museum of Holocaust and Resistance at the Ghetto Fighters House in Kibbutz Lohamei Hagetaot, Israel, as well as Yad Vashem in Jerusalem.

== Editions of Grossman's photos ==
- M. Grossman, With the Camera in the Ghetto, Tel-Aviv 1970: Ghetto Fighters' House and Hakibutz Hameuchad Publishing House (published in English, French and Hebrew). Second Edition 1972
- H. Loewy, "Fotogeschichte" 1991, Heft 38.
- My Secret Camera: Life in the Lodz Ghetto, photographs by Mendel Grossman, text by Frank Dabba Smith, introduction by Howard Jacobson, ISBN 0-7112-1477-8, Great Britain 2000: Frances Lincoln Ltd.

== Bibliography ==
- Arie ben-Menachem, Grossman Mordka Mendel, [in:] Encyclopedia of the Holocaust, vol. 2, New York 1990 (phot.).
- Andrzej Kempa, Marek Szukalak, Żydzi dawnej Łodzi. Słownik biograficzny, vol. IV, Łódź 2004, pp. 62–63 (phot.; bibliography)
- Andrzej Kempa, Marek Szukalak, The Biographical Dictionary of the Jews from Lodz, Lodz 2006: Oficyna Bibliofilów, ISBN 83-87522-83-X, p. 86 (Mordka Mendel Grossman's biographical note).
- Unsere einziger Weg is Arbeit. Das Getto in Łódź 1940-1944, Frankfurt a. Main 1990 (here M. Grossman's death-date: 30 April 1945).
