= Friedersdorf (bei Königs Wusterhausen) station =

Railway station in Germany

Friedersdorf (bei Königs Wusterhausen) Friedersdorf (b Königs Wusterhausen)
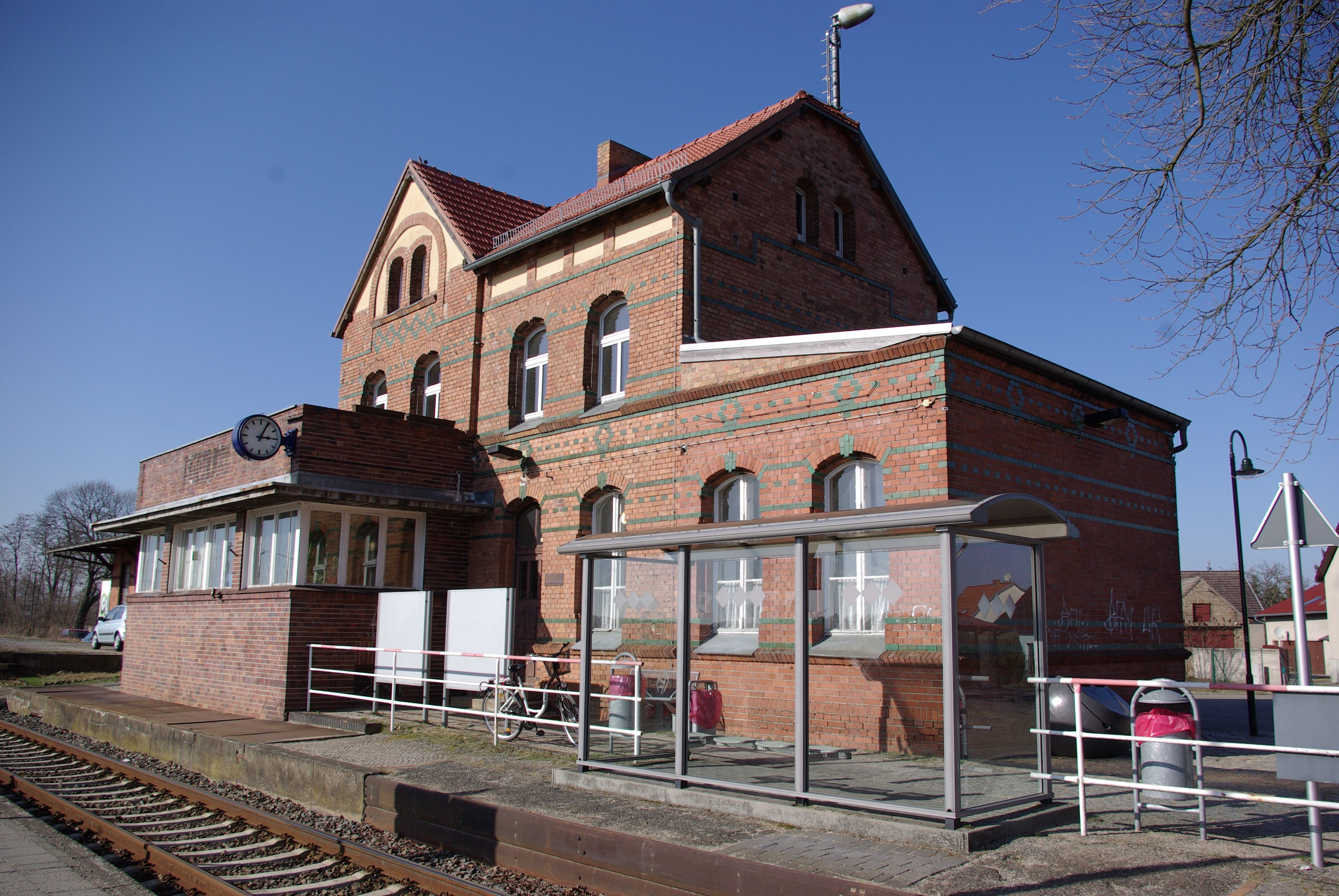
- 2010

General information
- Location: Bahnhofstraße 9; 15754 Heidesee; Brandenburg; Germany
- Coordinates: 52.2897°N 13.7866°E
- Owner: DB Netz
- Operator: DB Station&Service
- Lines: Königs Wusterhausen–Grunow railway (KBS 209.36)
- Platforms: 1 island platform
- Tracks: 2
- Train operators: Niederbarnimer Eisenbahn

Other information
- Station code: 1934
- DS100 code: BFDF
- IBNR: 8011574
- Category: 6
- Fare zone: VBB: 6062
- Website: www.bahnhof.de

Services
Preceding station	Niederbarnimer Eisenbahn	Following station
Kablow towards Königs Wusterhausen	RB 36	Kummersdorf (bei Storkow) towards Frankfurt (Oder)
Location
- Location within Brandenburg

Friedersdorf (bei Königs Wusterhausen) station is a railway station in the Friedersdorf district in the municipality of Heidesee, located in the Dahme-Spreewald district in Brandenburg, Germany.
