= Jadwinów =

Jadwinów may refer to the following places:

- Jadwinów, Łódź Voivodeship (central Poland)
- Jadwinów, Radom County in Masovian Voivodeship (east-central Poland)
- Jadwinów, Zwoleń County in Masovian Voivodeship (east-central Poland)
