= Niederlehme station =

Railway station in Niederlehme, Germany

Niederlehme

General information
- Location: Am Bahnhof 1; 15751 Niederlehme; Brandenburg; Germany
- Coordinates: 52.3020°N 13.6522°E
- Owner: DB Netz
- Operator: DB Station&Service
- Lines: Königs Wusterhausen–Grunow railway (KBS 209.36)
- Platforms: 1 side platform
- Tracks: 1
- Train operators: Niederbarnimer Eisenbahn

Other information
- Station code: 4506
- DS100 code: BNDL
- IBNR: 8012489
- Category: 7
- Fare zone: VBB: Berlin C/5960
- Website: www.bahnhof.de

Services
Preceding station	Niederbarnimer Eisenbahn	Following station
Königs Wusterhausen Terminus	RB 36	Zernsdorf towards Frankfurt (Oder)
Location
- Location within Brandenburg Location within Germany Location within Europe

Niederlehme station is a railway station in the Niederlehme district in the municipality of Königs Wusterhausen, located in the Dahme-Spreewald district in Brandenburg, Germany.
