= Isolde Hausser =

German physicist (1889–1951)

- Born: Isolde Ganswindt; 7 December 1889; Berlin, German Empire
- Died: 5 October 1951 (aged 61); Heidelberg, West Germany
- Citizenship: German
- Education: University of Berlin
- Spouse: Karl Wilhelm Hausser (m. 1918; died 1933)
- Children: Karl Hermann Hausser (1919–2001)
- Parents: Hermann Ganswindt (father); Anna Minna Fritsche (mother)
- Scientific career
- Fields: Physics
- Workplaces: Telefunken, Kaiser Wilhelm Institute for Medical Research, Max Planck Institute for Medical Research
- Thesis: Erzeugung und Empfang kurzer elektrischer Wellen (1914)

Isolde Hausser (née Ganswindt; 7 December 1889 – 5 October 1951) was a German physicist. She became the head of a department of the Max Planck Institute for Medical Research (then Kaiser Wilhelm Institute for Medical Research) in Heidelberg in 1935.

== Life and work ==
Ganswindt was the daughter of Hermann Ganswindt and his first wife Anna Minna (née Fritsche, 1866-1911). After graduating from the Chamisso School in Berlin-Schöneberg in 1909, she began studying physics, mathematics, and philosophy at the University of Berlin. In 1914, she received a doctorate degree in physics with a dissertation titled Erzeugung und Empfang kurzer elektrischer Wellen ("Production and reception of short electrical waves").

From 1914 to 1929 she worked as a staff member in the research department of Telefunken in Berlin under the direction of Hans Rukop (1883-1958), with whom she also published several research papers. She married the physicist Karl Wilhelm Hausser (1887-1933) in 1918, with whom she had a son, Karl Hermann Hausser (1919-2001). In 1929 she joined the Kaiser Wilhelm Institute for Medical Research in Heidelberg, where she became head of an independent department in 1935. The Kaiser Wilhelm Institute for Medical Research later became the Max Planck Institute for Medical Research. She worked there until her death in 1951.

Isolde Hausser made contributions to vacuum tube research, the physics underlying radiation therapy, radar technology, and research on radiation in medicine.

The Isolde-Hausser-Straße ("Isolde Hausser street") in Königs Wusterhausen is named after her.
