= Blossin =

- Ortsteil of Heidesee
- Coat of arms

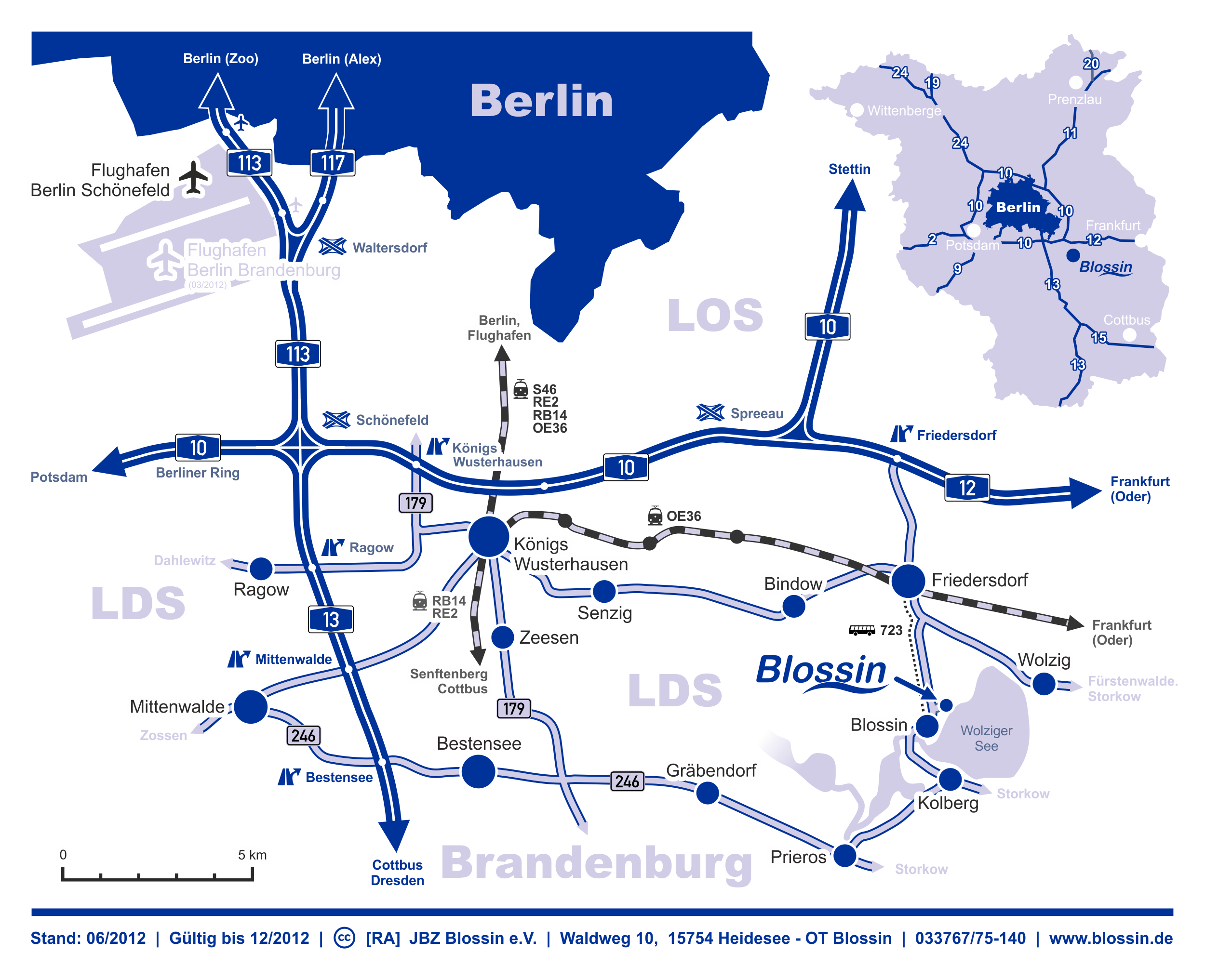
- Road map of Blossin and surroundings
- Interactive map of Blossin
- Location within Germany Location within Brandenburg
- Coordinates: 52°16′59″N 13°48′00″E
- Country: Germany
- State: Brandenburg
- District: Dahme-Spreewald
- Municipality: Heidesee

Area
  - Total: 12.87 km^{2} (4.97 sq mi)
- Elevation: 35 m (115 ft)

Population
  - Total: 200
  - Density: 16/km^{2} (40/sq mi)
- Time zone: UTC+01:00 (CET)
  - Summer (DST): UTC+02:00 (CEST)
- Website: www.blossin.de

Blossin is a village in the municipality of Heidesee in the district of Dahme-Spreewald in Brandenburg (Germany) - southeast of Berlin.

The place of Blessin is first mentioned in the year 1448.

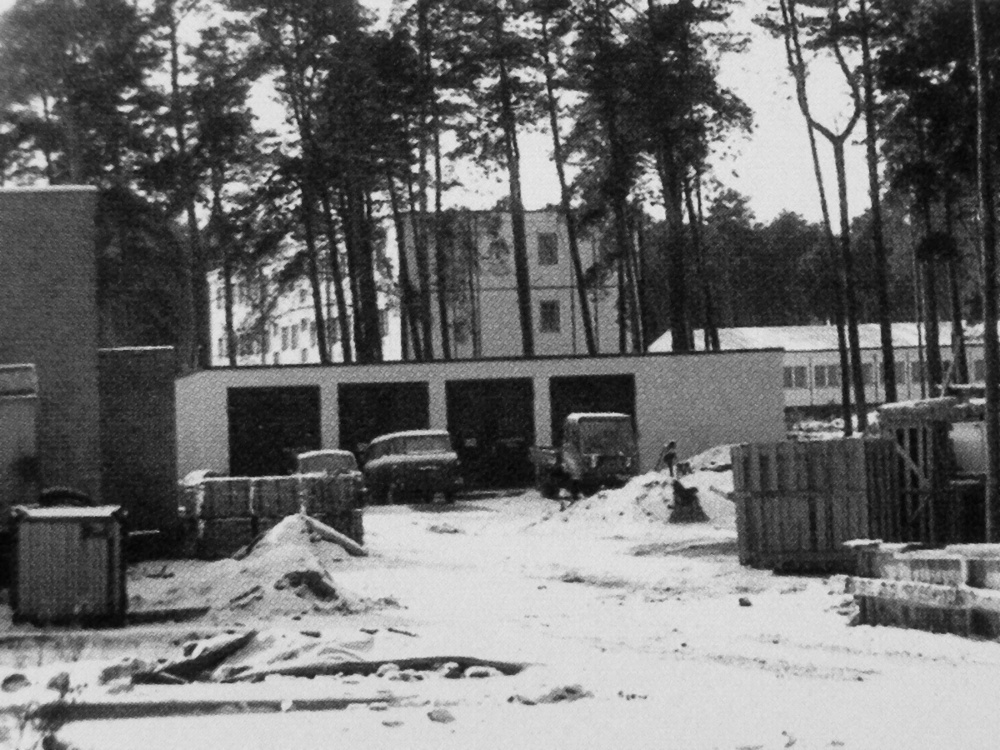
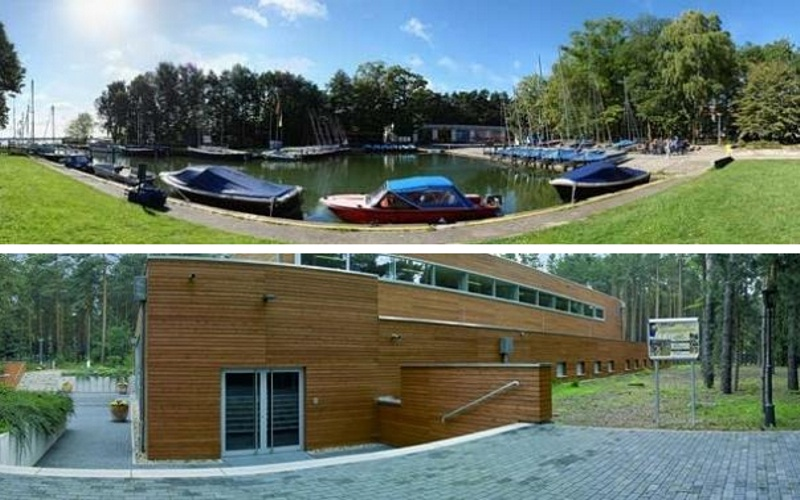
Blossin 1983 and 2007

From 1960 until 1990 in the area north of Blossin a training school centre for university water sports of the GDR was established.
In the year 1992 the "Jugendbildungszentrum Blossin" (Youth Education Centre Blossin) was founded as a non-profit association to operate as an educational institution for the youth and combining education and leisure on land and on water. All year round every age group can partake in activities in the “Lernwelt (World of Learning Blossin)”, “Tagungswelt (World of Conference Blossin)” and “Erlebniswelt (World of Experience Blossin)” thus kind of non-formal education and freetime-activities.

The centre is located in the middle of a pinewood forest, directly at the Lake Wolzig and have to harbours, modern conference rooms, classrooms, a sports and event hall and various possibilities for sports activities.
