= Kablow station =

Railway station in Germany

Kablow
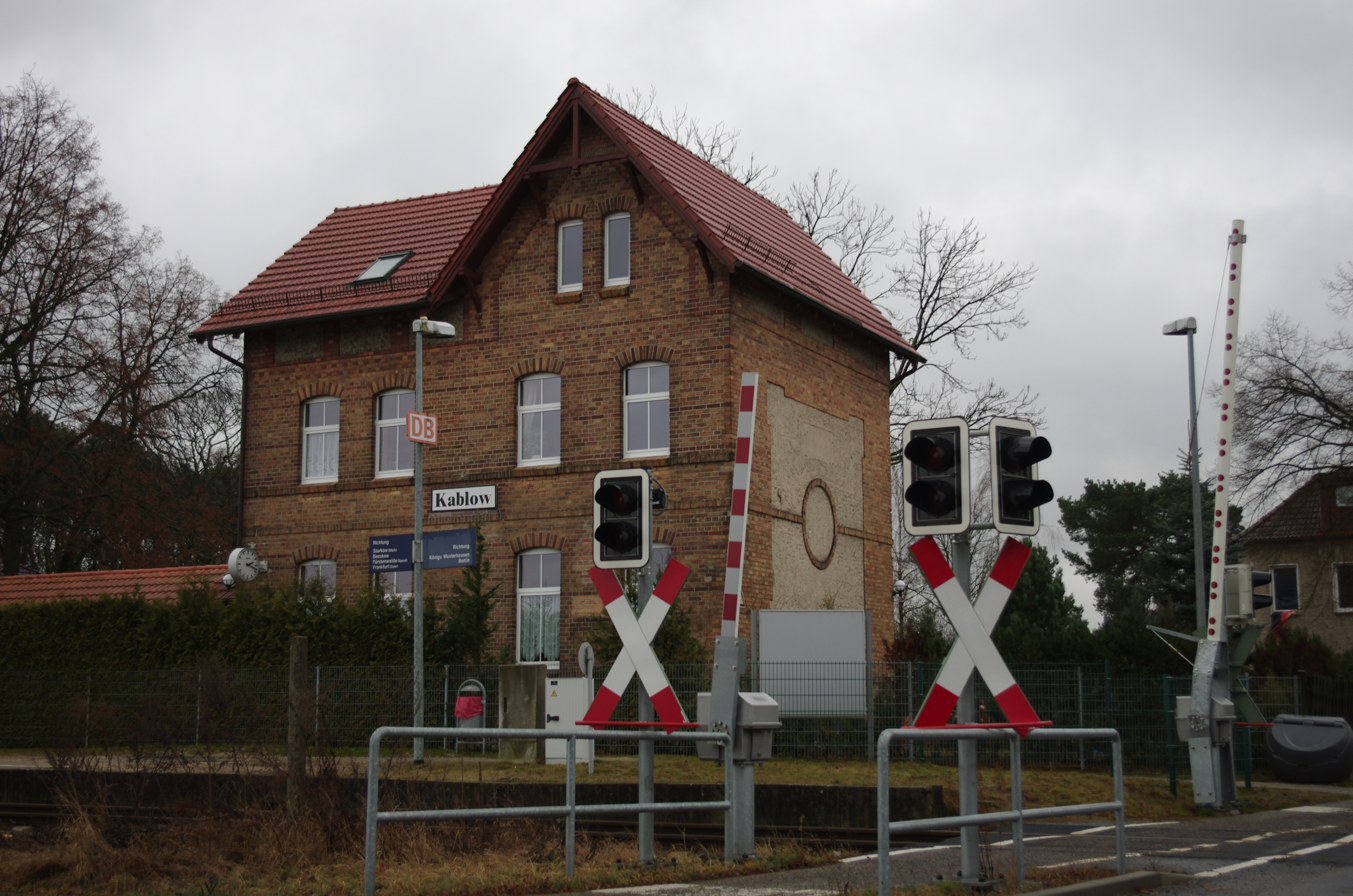
- 2013

General information
- Location: Bahnhofstraße/Ziegeleier Straße; 15712 Kablow; Brandenburg; Germany
- Coordinates: 52°18′00″N 13°43′18″E
- Owner: DB Netz
- Operator: DB Station&Service
- Lines: Königs Wusterhausen–Grunow railway (KBS 209.36)
- Platforms: 1 side platform
- Tracks: 1
- Train operators: Niederbarnimer Eisenbahn

Other information
- Station code: 3076
- DS100 code: BKAB
- IBNR: 8011981
- Category: 7
- Fare zone: VBB: Berlin C/5960
- Website: www.bahnhof.de

Services
Preceding station	Niederbarnimer Eisenbahn	Following station
Zernsdorf towards Königs Wusterhausen	RB 36	Friedersdorf (bei Königs Wusterhausen) towards Frankfurt (Oder)
Location
- Location within Brandenburg

Kablow station is a railway station in the Kablow district in the municipality of Königs Wusterhausen, located in the Dahme-Spreewald district in Brandenburg, Germany.
