= Borzęcin =

Borzęcin may refer to the following places in Poland:

- Borzęcin, Lower Silesian Voivodeship (south-west Poland)
- Borzęcin, Łódź Voivodeship (central Poland)
- Borzęcin, Lesser Poland Voivodeship (south Poland)
- Borzęcin, Masovian Voivodeship (east-central Poland)
- Borzęcin, Pomeranian Voivodeship (north Poland)
- Borzęcin, West Pomeranian Voivodeship (north-west Poland)
