= Kamienny Most =

Kamienny Most may refer to the following places in Poland:

- Kamienny Most, Łódź Voivodeship
- Kamienny Most, West Pomeranian Voivodeship

== See also ==
- Kamienny
