= Kolonia Kotków =

Settlement in Gmina Gorzkowice, Poland

- Settlement
- Location within Poland
- Coordinates: 51°10′58.69″N 19°36′33.72″E
- Country: Poland
- Voivodeship: Łódź
- County: Piotrków
- Gmina: Gorzkowice

Kolonia Kotków [kɔˈlɔɲa ˈkɔtkuf] is a settlement in the administrative district of Gmina Gorzkowice, within Piotrków County, Łódź Voivodeship, in central Poland.
