= Szczepanowice, Łódź Voivodeship =

Szczepanowice
- Village
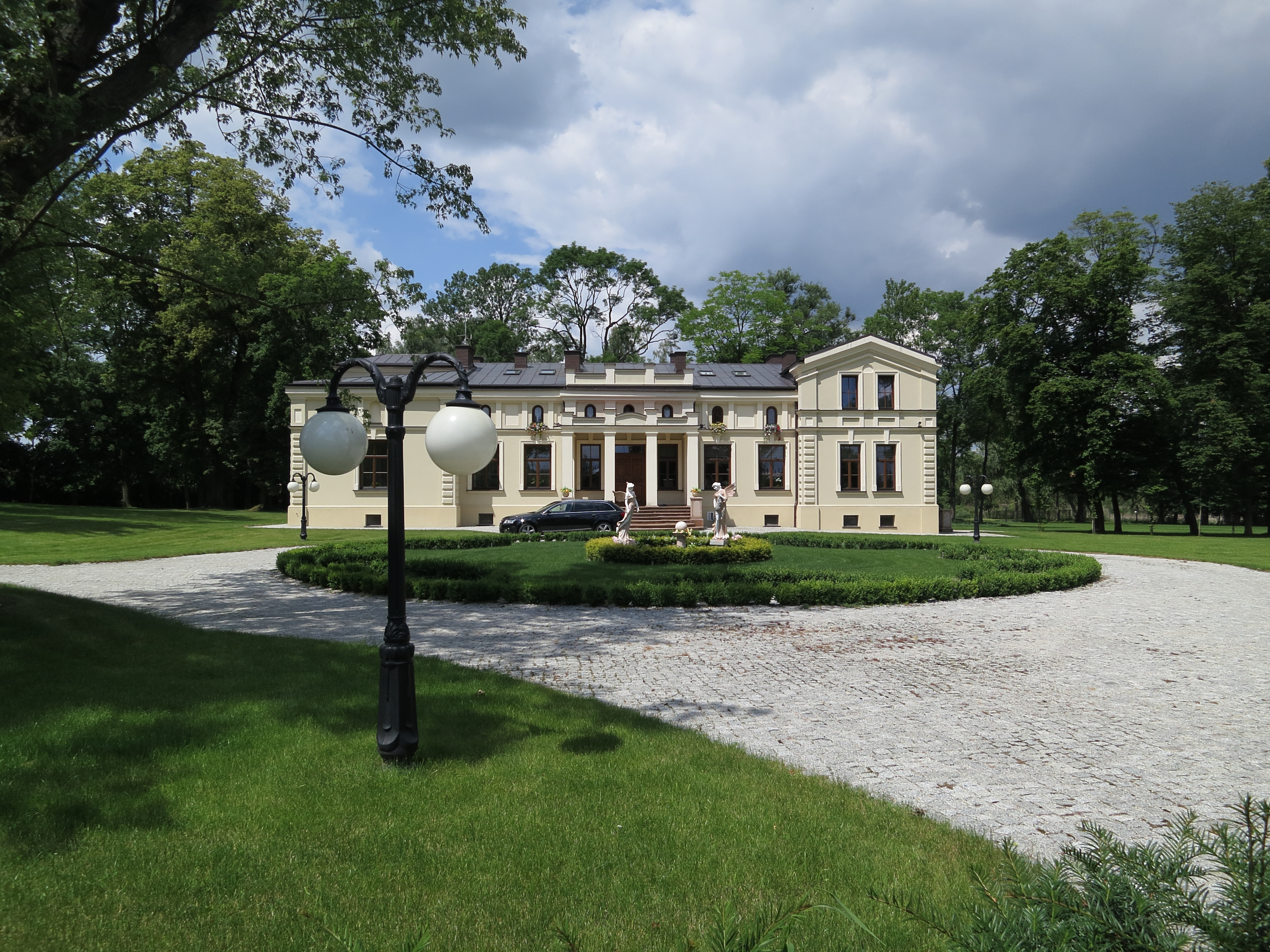

- Location within Poland
- Coordinates: 51°14′N 19°38′E
- Country: Poland
- Voivodeship: Łódź
- County: Piotrków
- Gmina: Gorzkowice

Szczepanowice [ʂt͡ʂɛpanɔˈvit͡sɛ] is a village in the administrative district of Gmina Gorzkowice, within Piotrków County, Łódź Voivodeship, in central Poland.
