= Bujnice ZR =

- Settlement
- Location within Poland
- Coordinates: 51°13′20.14″N 19°37′14.64″E
- Country: Poland
- Voivodeship: Łódź
- County: Piotrków
- Gmina: Gorzkowice

Bujnice ZR is a settlement in the administrative district of Gmina Gorzkowice, within Piotrków County, Łódź Voivodeship, in central Poland.
