= Krosno-Huby =

- Settlement
- Country: Poland
- Voivodeship: Łódź
- County: Piotrków
- Gmina: Gorzkowice

Krosno-Huby [ˈkrɔsnɔ ˈxubɨ] is a settlement in the administrative district of Gmina Gorzkowice, within Piotrków County, Łódź Voivodeship, in central Poland.
