= Pieńki Stolarskie =

- Village
- Location within Poland
- Coordinates: 51°14′00″N 19°33′35″E
- Country: Poland
- Voivodeship: Łódź
- County: Piotrków
- Gmina: Gorzkowice

Pieńki Stolarskie [ˈpjɛɲki stɔˈlarskʲɛ] is a village in the administrative district of Gmina Gorzkowice, within Piotrków County, Łódź Voivodeship, in central Poland.
