= Cieszanowice, Łódź Voivodeship =

Cieszanowice
- Village
- Location within Poland
- Coordinates: 51°14′N 19°40′E
- Country: Poland
- Voivodeship: Łódź
- County: Piotrków
- Gmina: Gorzkowice

Cieszanowice [t͡ɕɛʂanɔˈvit͡sɛ] is a village in the administrative district of Gmina Gorzkowice, within Piotrków County, Łódź Voivodeship, in central Poland.
