= Krosno-Dąbrowy =

- Settlement
- Location within Poland
- Coordinates: 51°09′56″N 19°41′02″E
- Country: Poland
- Voivodeship: Łódź
- County: Piotrków
- Gmina: Gorzkowice

Krosno-Dąbrowy [ˈkrɔsnɔ dɔmˈbrɔvɨ] is a settlement in the administrative district of Gmina Gorzkowice, within Piotrków County, Łódź Voivodeship, in central Poland.
