= Kummersdorf (bei Storkow) station =

German railway station in Brandenburg, Germany

Kummersdorf (bei Storkow) Kummersdorf (b Storkow)
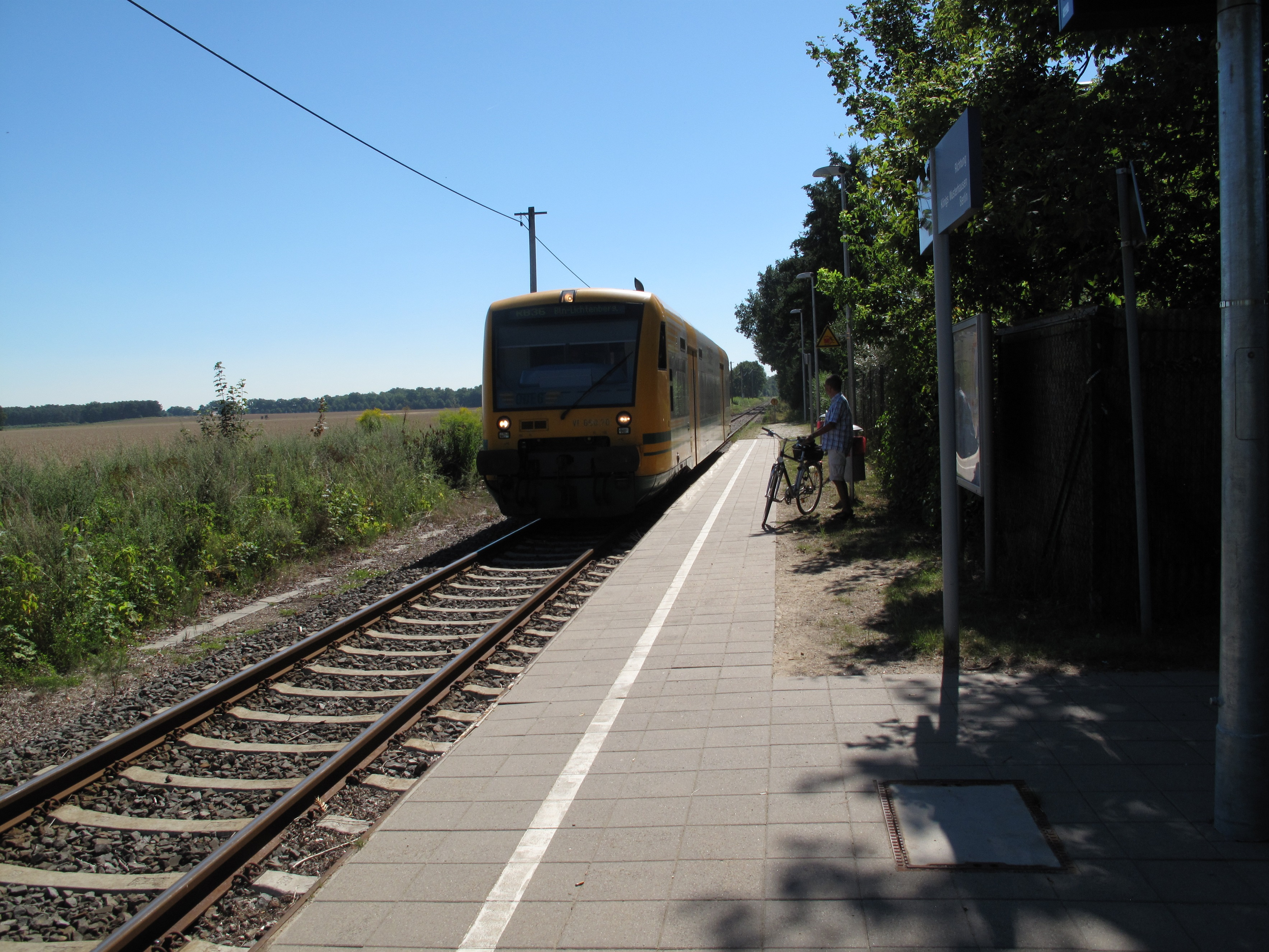
- 2013

General information
- Location: Bahnhofstraße; 15859 Storkow (Mark); Brandenburg; Germany
- Coordinates: 52.2752°N 13.8736°E
- Owner: DB Netz
- Operator: DB Station&Service
- Lines: Königs Wusterhausen–Grunow railway (KBS 209.36)
- Platforms: 1 side platform
- Tracks: 1
- Train operators: Niederbarnimer Eisenbahn

Other information
- Station code: 3460
- DS100 code: BKUM
- IBNR: 8012129
- Category: 7
- Fare zone: VBB: 6063
- Website: www.bahnhof.de

Services
Preceding station	Niederbarnimer Eisenbahn	Following station
Friedersdorf (bei Königs Wusterhausen) towards Königs Wusterhausen	RB 36	Storkow (Mark) towards Frankfurt (Oder)
Location
- Location within Brandenburg

Kummersdorf (bei Storkow) station is a railway station in the Kummersdorf district in the municipality of Storkow (Mark), located in the Oder-Spree district in Brandenburg, Germany.
