= Hermann Ganswindt =

German inventor and spaceflight scientist

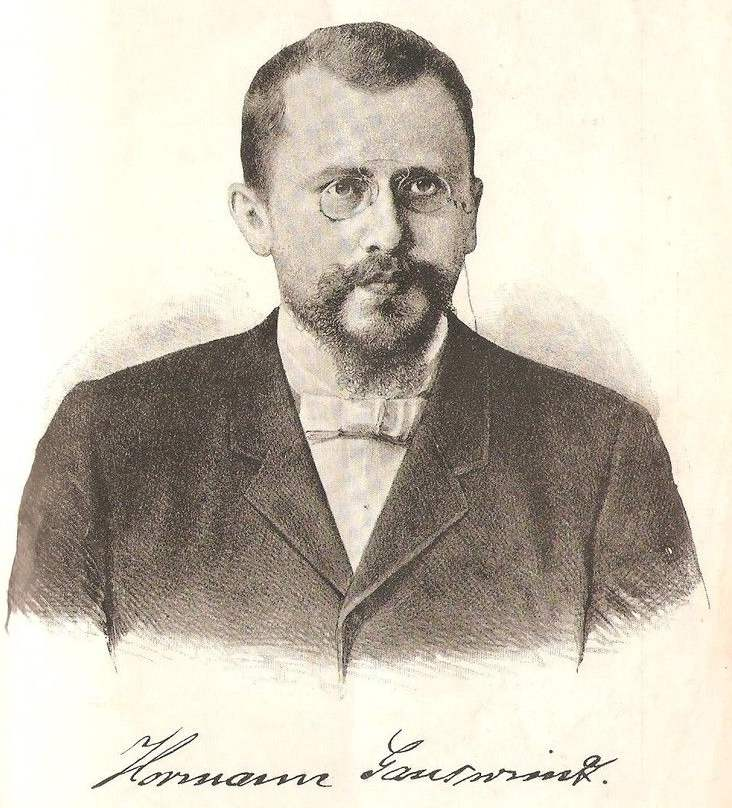
- Born: Johann Hermann Ganswindt; 12 June 1856
- Died: 25 October 1934 (aged 78); Berlin, Germany
- Occupations: Inventor, scientist

Hermann Ganswindt (12 June 1856, Voigtshof bei Seeburg, East Prussia – 25 October 1934) was a German inventor and spaceflight scientist, whose inventions (such as the helicopter) are thought to have been ahead of his time.

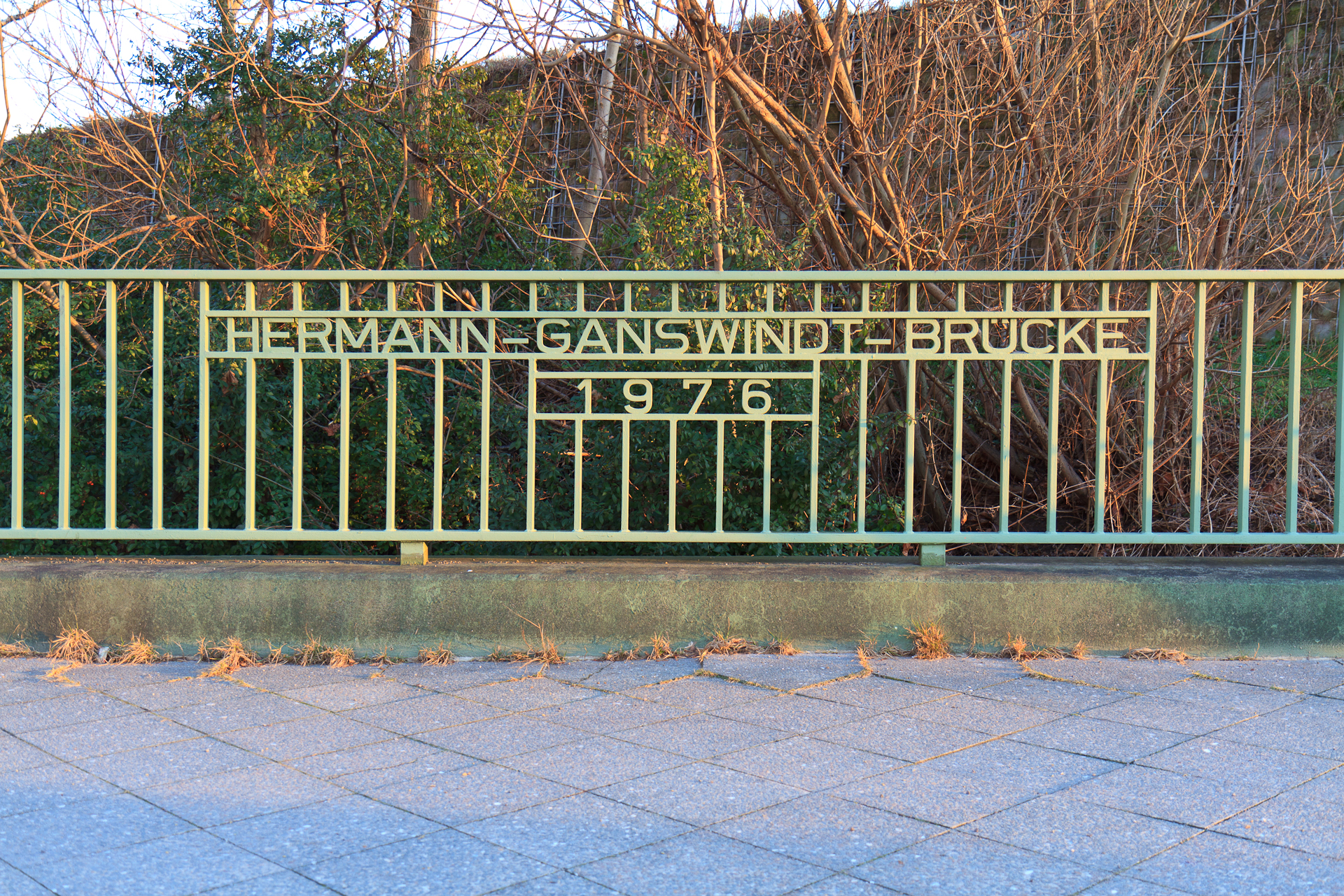
Lettering of the Hermann Ganswindt bridge in Berlin-Schöneberg

He was born in Voigtshof near Seeburg, East Prussia. During his youth, he showed an interest in technology. As a student he developed a freewheel for bicycles, which he later produced in Berlin-Schöneberg. Following a suggestion by his parents he attended law school at the universities of Zurich and Leipzig. After completion of his military service he enrolled at the University of Berlin. However, he was exmatriculated for not undertaking his studies.

After 1880 he developed concepts for a space vehicle based on the principle of repulsion. His two-stage vehicle was designed to be driven by a series of dynamite explosions. Since it was to be taken aloft by way of a carrier vehicle, he designed a helicopter as early as 1884.

On 27 May 1891, he gave a public speech at the Berlin Philharmony in which he introduced his concept of a galactic vehicle (Weltenfahrzeug). In July 1901 the maiden flight of his helicopter took place in Berlin-Schöneberg, which probably was the first heavier-than-air motor-driven flight carrying humans. A movie covering the event was taken by Max Skladanowsky, but it remains lost.

In 1902, Ganswindt was accused of fraud and arrested because he had added a safety bar to his vehicle to prevent it from rolling. After spending eight weeks in pre-trial custody he was released after a flight demonstration proved his innocence. Nevertheless, his business was ruined. He died in Berlin in 1934.

== Legacy ==
Ganswindt's work is considered to be ahead of his time by several decades since his contemporary fellows had been unable to recognize the impact of his ideas. During his late years he kept in touch with Austrian rocket pioneer Max Valier as well as with German rocket pioneer Hermann Oberth, who shared his knowledge of Robert Goddard's work with him.

In 1975, the city of Berlin recognized his achievements by naming a bridge (Hermann-Ganswindt-Brücke) in Berlin-Schöneberg. The International Astronomical Union (IAU) named the lunar crater Ganswindt in his honor.

His enthusiasm towards space travel was shared by one of his sons, who worked for Wernher von Braun's moon program. His daughter Isolde Hausser became a physicist.

== See also ==
- Konstantin Tsiolkovsky
- Hermann Oberth
- Robert H. Goddard
- Spacecraft propulsion
- List of German inventors and discoverers

== Literature ==
- H. Ganswindt: Die Lenkbarkeit des aerostatischen Luftschiffes : gemeinfaßlich mit ausführlichen Berechnungen und Zeichnungen dargestellt; Berlin : Gsellius, 1884
- H. Ganswindt: Das jüngste Gericht; Erfindungen von Hermann Ganswindt; 2nd edition, with illustrations and expertise. Schöneberg b. Berlin: Selbstverl., 1899
- Daniel Brandau: 'Cultivating the Cosmos: Spaceflight Thought in Imperial Germany', in: History and Technology 28, no.3 (2012), pp. 225–54.
