= Gmina Gorzkowice =

Gmina Gorzkowice Gorzkowice Commune
- Gmina

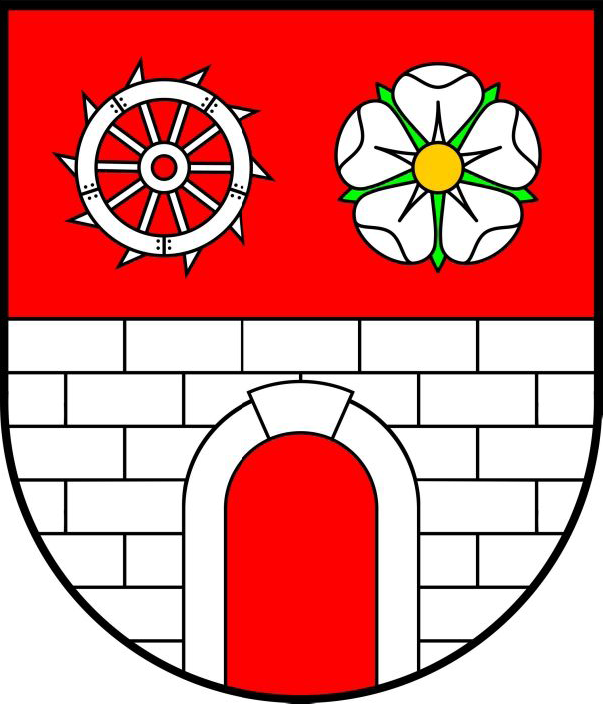
- Flag Coat of arms
- Interactive map of Gmina Gorzkowice
- Coordinates (Gorzkowice): 51°13′N 19°36′E
- Country: Poland
- Voivodeship: Łódź
- County: Piotrków County
- Seat: Gorzkowice

Area
  - Total: 102.29 km^{2} (39.49 sq mi)

Population (2006)
  - Total: 8,631
  - Density: 84.38/km^{2} (218.5/sq mi)
- Time zone: UTC+1 (CET)
  - Summer (DST): UTC+2 (CEST)
- Website: www.gorzkowice.pl

Gmina Gorzkowice is a rural gmina (administrative district) in Piotrków County, Łódź Voivodeship, in central Poland. Its seat is the village of Gorzkowice, which lies approximately 22 kilometres (14 mi) south of Piotrków Trybunalski and 64 km (40 mi) south of the regional capital Łódź.

The gmina covers an area of 102.29 square kilometres (39.5 sq mi), and as of 2006 its total population is 8,631.

The current mayor is Alojzy Włodarczyk. The Deputy Mayor is Robert Kukulski.

== History ==
The earliest traces of settlement in the Gorzkowice commune date back to nearly 3000 years ago, while the earliest mention comes from the Middle Ages, when the Archbishop Janisław gave the local parish church the tithes from the surrounding villages. In 1414, the number of people in the village was estimated at 720.

== Villages ==
Gmina Gorzkowice contains the villages and settlements of:

- Białek
- Borzęcin
- Bujnice
- Bujnice ZR
- Bujniczki
- Bukowina
- Cieszanowice
- Czerno
- Daniszewice
- Góry Rdułtowskie
- Gorzędów-Kolonia
- Gorzkowice
- Gorzkowiczki
- Gościnna
- Grabostów
- Grabowiec
- Jadwinów
- Józefina
- Kamienny Most
- Kolonia Bujnice
- Kolonia Kotków
- Kolonia Krzemieniewice
- Kolonia Plucice
- Kolonia Żuchowice
- Komorniki
- Kopanina
- Kotków
- Krosno
- Krosno-Biadów
- Krosno-Bugaj
- Krosno-Dąbrowy
- Krosno-Huby
- Krosno-Ludwików
- Krzemieniewice
- Marianek
- Pieńki Gorzkowskie
- Pieńki Stolarskie
- Plucice
- Poręba Sobaków
- Porosło
- Rdułtowice
- Rogów
- Ryszardów
- Sobaków
- Sobakówek
- Sosnowiec
- Szczepanowice
- Szczukocice
- Wilkoszewice
- Wola Kotkowska
- Żuchowice

== Neighbouring gminas ==
Gmina Gorzkowice is bordered by the gminas of Gomunice, Kamieńsk, Kodrąb, Łęki Szlacheckie, Masłowice and Rozprza.
