= Józefina, Piotrków County =

Józefina
- Settlement
- Location within Poland
- Coordinates: 51°13′59″N 19°34′29″E
- Country: Poland
- Voivodeship: Łódź
- County: Piotrków
- Gmina: Gorzkowice

Józefina [juzɛˈfina] is a settlement in the administrative district of Gmina Gorzkowice, within Piotrków County, Łódź Voivodeship, in central Poland.
