= Krosno, Łódź Voivodeship =

Krosno
- Village
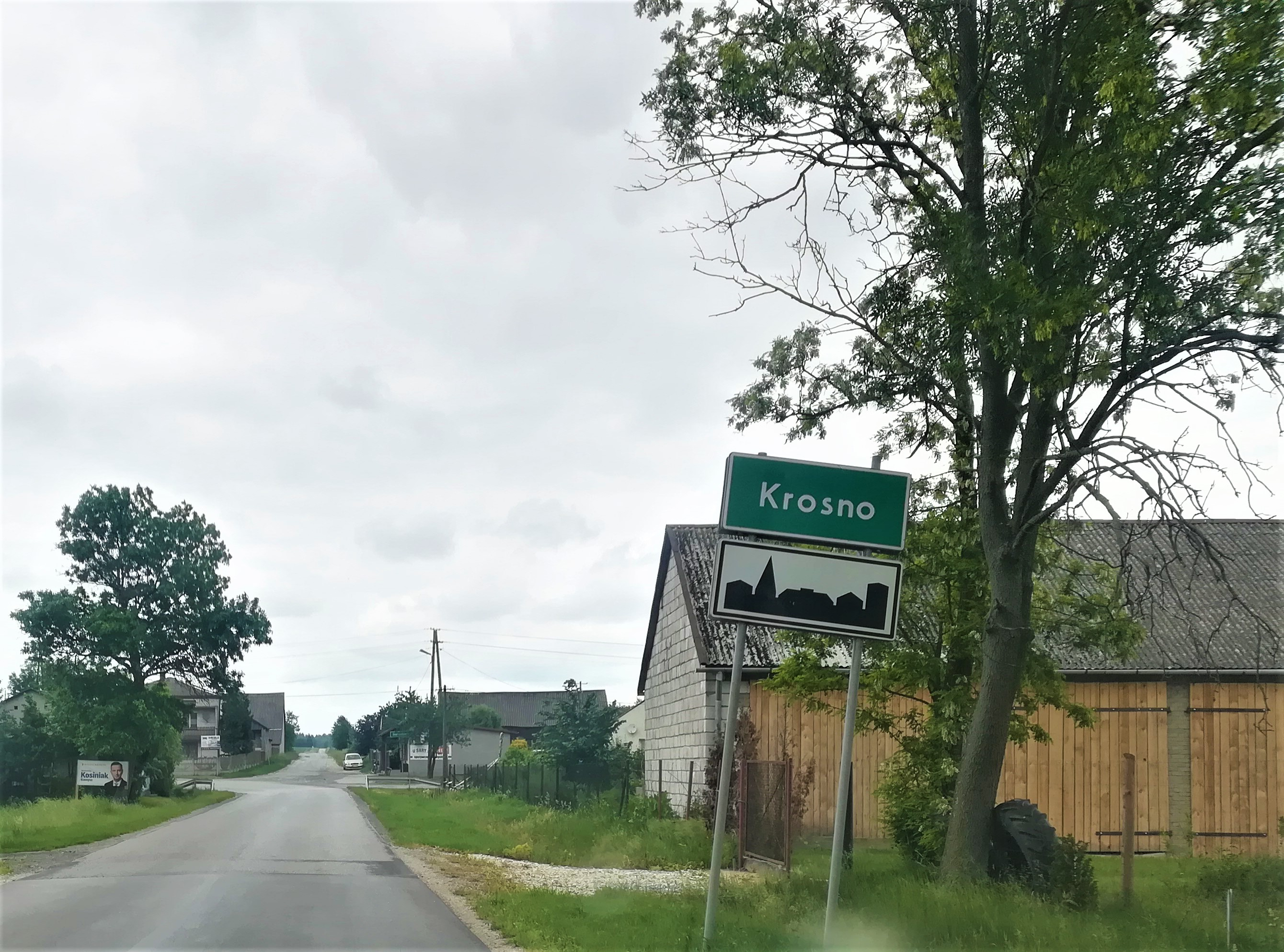

- Location within Poland
- Coordinates: 51°10′N 19°41′E
- Country: Poland
- Voivodeship: Łódź
- County: Piotrków
- Gmina: Gorzkowice

Krosno [ˈkrɔsnɔ] is a village in the administrative district of Gmina Gorzkowice, within Piotrków County, Łódź Voivodeship, in central Poland.
