= Storkow (Mark) station =

Railway station in Storkow (Mark), Germany

Storkow (Mark)
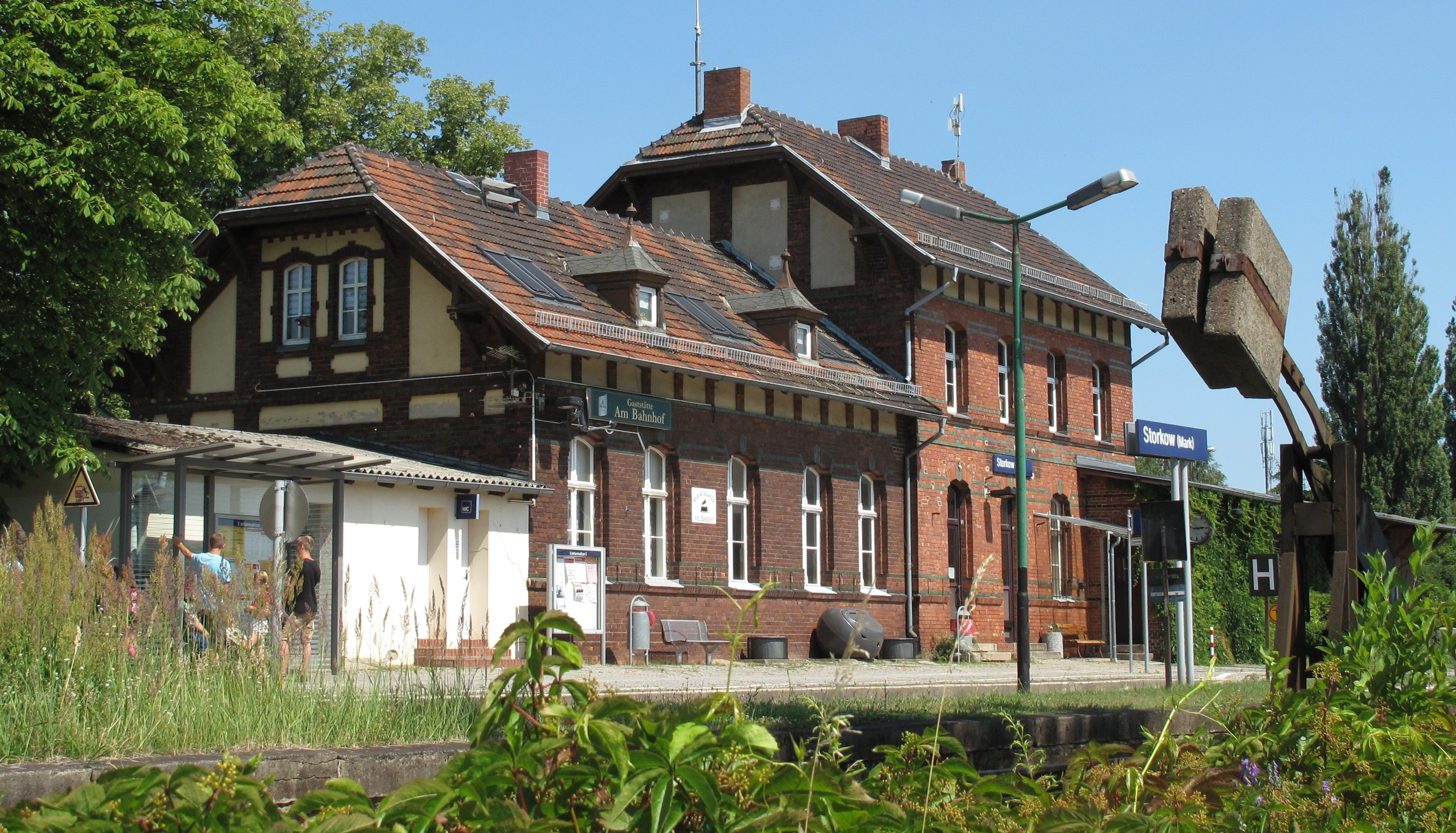
- 2013

General information
- Location: Am Bahnhof 2; 15859 Storkow (Mark); Brandenburg; Germany
- Coordinates: 52.2518°N 13.9209°E
- Owner: DB Netz
- Operator: DB Station&Service
- Lines: Königs Wusterhausen–Grunow railway (KBS 209.36)
- Platforms: 1 island platform
- Tracks: 2
- Train operators: Niederbarnimer Eisenbahn

Other information
- Station code: 6041
- DS100 code: BSTW
- IBNR: 8013058
- Category: 6
- Fare zone: VBB: 6064
- Website: www.bahnhof.de

Services
Preceding station	Niederbarnimer Eisenbahn	Following station
Kummersdorf (bei Storkow) towards Königs Wusterhausen	RB 36	Hubertushöhe towards Frankfurt (Oder)
Location
- Location within Brandenburg

Storkow (Mark) station is a railway station in the municipality of Storkow (Mark), located in the Oder-Spree district in Brandenburg, Germany.
