= Notte =

River in Germany

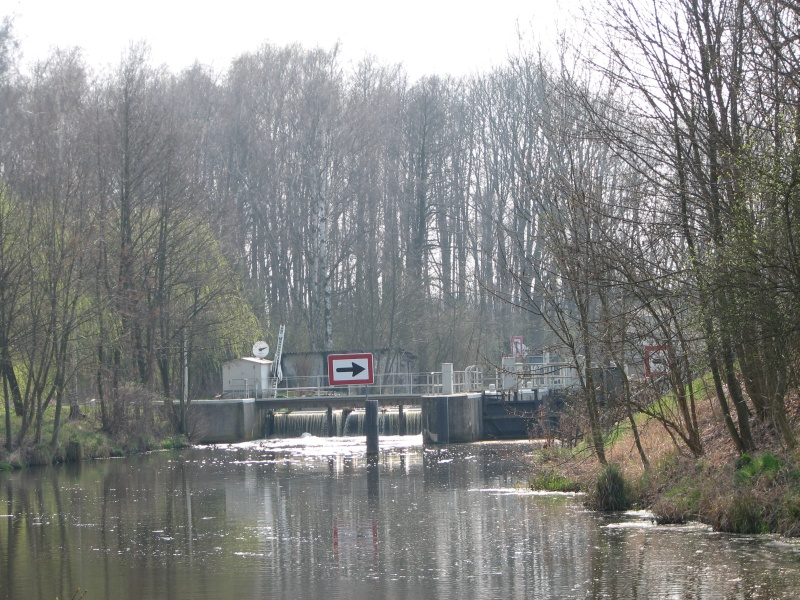

Location
- Country: Germany
- States: Brandenburg

Physical characteristics
- Mouth
  - location: Dahme
  - coordinates: 52.3077°N 13.6436°E

Basin features
- Progression: Dahme→ Spree→ Havel→ Elbe→ North Sea

Notte (German pronunciation: [ˈnɔtə]) is a river of Brandenburg, Germany. It flows into the Dahme in Königs Wusterhausen.

== See also ==
- List of rivers of Brandenburg
