= Sosnowiec, Piotrków County =

Sosnowiec
- Settlement
- Location within Poland
- Coordinates: 51°11′10″N 19°40′24″E
- Country: Poland
- Voivodeship: Łódź
- County: Piotrków
- Gmina: Gorzkowice

Sosnowiec (pronounced [sɔsˈnɔvjɛts]) is a settlement in the administrative district of Gmina Gorzkowice, within Piotrków County, Łódź Voivodeship, in central Poland.

== Also Refer ==
The Sielecki Castle was built in the 17th century and it is the oldest building in the city.
