= Gorzędów-Kolonia =

Village in Gmina Gorzkowice, Poland

- Village
- Location within Poland
- Coordinates: 51°12′21″N 19°33′44″E
- Country: Poland
- Voivodeship: Łódź
- County: Piotrków
- Gmina: Gorzkowice

Gorzędów-Kolonia [ɡɔˈʐɛnduf kɔˈlɔɲa] is a village in the administrative district of Gmina Gorzkowice, within Piotrków County, Łódź Voivodeship, in central Poland.
