= Bukowina, Piotrków County =

Bukowina
- Settlement
- Location within Poland
- Coordinates: 51°14′N 19°36′E
- Country: Poland
- Voivodeship: Łódź
- County: Piotrków
- Gmina: Gorzkowice

Bukowina [bukɔˈvina] is a settlement in the administrative district of Gmina Gorzkowice, within Piotrków County, Łódź Voivodeship, in central Poland.
