= Grabowiec, Piotrków County =

Grabowiec
- Village
- Location within Poland
- Coordinates: 51°11′39″N 19°41′13″E
- Country: Poland
- Voivodeship: Łódź
- County: Piotrków
- Gmina: Gorzkowice
- Population: 140

Grabowiec [ɡraˈbɔvjɛt͡s] is a village in the administrative district of Gmina Gorzkowice, within Piotrków County, Łódź Voivodeship, in central Poland.
