= Czerno =

- Village
- Location within Poland
- Coordinates: 51°15′1″N 19°34′10″E
- Country: Poland
- Voivodeship: Łódź
- County: Piotrków
- Gmina: Gorzkowice
- Population: 100

Czerno [ˈt͡ʂɛrnɔ] is a village in the administrative district of Gmina Gorzkowice, within Piotrków County, Łódź Voivodeship, in central Poland.
