= Krosno-Ludwików =

- Settlement
- Location within Poland
- Coordinates: 51°09′23″N 19°40′24″E
- Country: Poland
- Voivodeship: Łódź
- County: Piotrków
- Gmina: Gorzkowice

Krosno-Ludwików [ˈkrɔsnɔ ludˈvikuf] is a settlement in the administrative district of Gmina Gorzkowice, within Piotrków County, Łódź Voivodeship, in central Poland.
