= Porosło =

- Village
- Location within Poland
- Coordinates: 51°14′13″N 19°33′26″E
- Country: Poland
- Voivodeship: Łódź
- County: Piotrków
- Gmina: Gorzkowice

Porosło [pɔˈrɔswɔ] is a village in the administrative district of Gmina Gorzkowice, within Piotrków County, Łódź Voivodeship, in central Poland.
