= Gorzkowiczki =

- Village
- Location within Poland
- Coordinates: 51°14′N 19°35′E
- Country: Poland
- Voivodeship: Łódź
- County: Piotrków
- Gmina: Gorzkowice

Gorzkowiczki [ɡɔʂkɔˈvit͡ʂki] is a village in the administrative district of Gmina Gorzkowice, within Piotrków County, Łódź Voivodeship, in central Poland.
