= Kolonia Plucice =

- Settlement
- Location within Poland
- Coordinates: 51°12′N 19°37′E
- Country: Poland
- Voivodeship: Łódź
- County: Piotrków
- Gmina: Gorzkowice

Kolonia Plucice [kɔˈlɔɲa pluˈt͡ɕit͡sɛ] is a settlement in the administrative district of Gmina Gorzkowice, within Piotrków County, Łódź Voivodeship, in central Poland.
