= Rdułtowice =

Polish village

- Village
- Location within Poland
- Coordinates: 51°10′28″N 19°38′01″E
- Country: Poland
- Voivodeship: Łódź
- County: Piotrków
- Gmina: Gorzkowice

Rdułtowice [rduu̯tɔˈvit͡sɛ] is a village in the administrative district of Gmina Gorzkowice, within Piotrków County, Łódź Voivodeship, in central Poland.
