= Ryszardów, Piotrków County =

Ryszardów
- Settlement
- Location within Poland
- Coordinates: 51°12′17″N 19°35′24″E
- Country: Poland
- Voivodeship: Łódź
- County: Piotrków
- Gmina: Gorzkowice

Ryszardów [rɨˈʂarduf] is a settlement in the administrative district of Gmina Gorzkowice, within Piotrków County, Łódź Voivodeship, in central Poland.
