= Kamienny =

Kamienny may refer to the following places in Poland:

- Kamienny Bród
- Kamienny Dół
- Kamienny Dwór
- Kamienny Jaz

== See also ==
- Kamienny Most
