= Krosno-Bugaj =

- Settlement
- Location within Poland
- Coordinates: 51°10′43″N 19°39′56″E
- Country: Poland
- Voivodeship: Łódź
- County: Piotrków
- Gmina: Gorzkowice

Krosno-Bugaj [ˈkrɔsnɔ ˈbuɡai̯] is a settlement in the administrative district of Gmina Gorzkowice, within Piotrków County, Łódź Voivodeship, in central Poland.
