= Komorniki, Gmina Gorzkowice =

Komorniki
- Settlement
- Location within Poland
- Coordinates: 51°10′35″N 19°36′33″E
- Country: Poland
- Voivodeship: Łódź
- County: Piotrków
- Gmina: Gorzkowice

Komorniki [kɔmɔrˈniki] is a settlement in the administrative district of Gmina Gorzkowice, within Piotrków County, Łódź Voivodeship, in central Poland.
