= Marek Kalbus =

German opera and concert singer (born 1969)

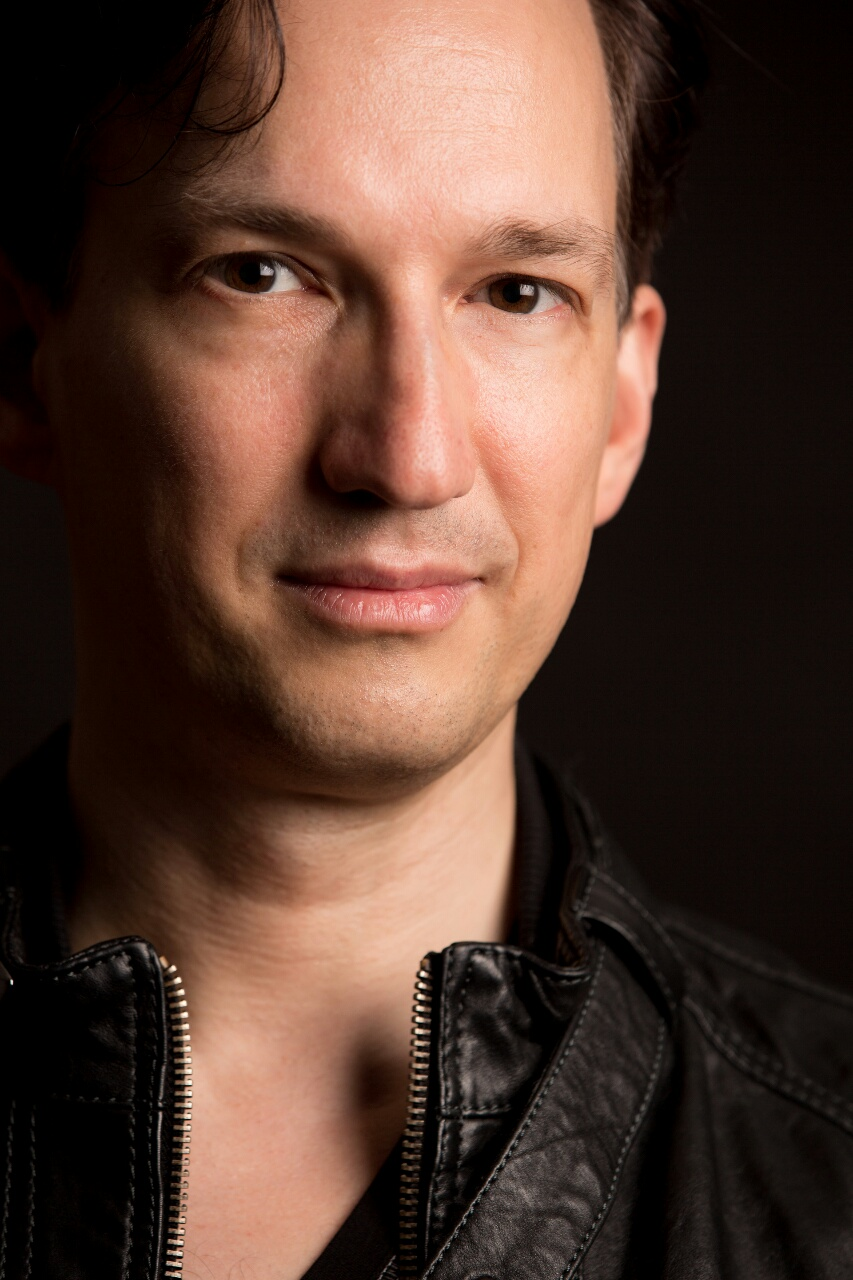
- Born: 14 January 1969 (age 56); Königs Wusterhausen, East Germany
- Occupation(s): Opera and concert singer

Marek Kalbus (born 14 January 1969 in Königs Wusterhausen) is a German opera and concert singer. He has the voice of a typical basso cantante and sings bass and bass-baritone roles.

== Studies ==
German basso cantante Marek Kalbus studied at the Hochschule für Musik "Hanns Eisler" in Berlin (teacher: Roman Trekel) and was taught for five years by the famous Italian soprano Celestina Casapietra.

== Career ==
In 2000, Marek Kalbus became laureate at the International Hans Gabor Belvedere Singing Competition Vienna. Since then he has sung in Germany, Italy, Denmark, Belgium, the Netherlands, the Czech Republic and Polland. Worldwide renowned stages, where Marek Kalbus has been heard recently, include Teatro Massimo (Palermo), Teatro Carlo Felice (Genoa), Teatro Dal Verme (Milan), Teatro Lirico di Cagliari, Oper Bonn, Teatro Municipal de Santiago de Chile, Konzerthaus Berlin and Berliner Philharmonie, International Art Centre De Singel (Antwerp), Beethoven Hall Bonn, the International Al Bustan Music Festival Beirut and Czech Philharmonic.

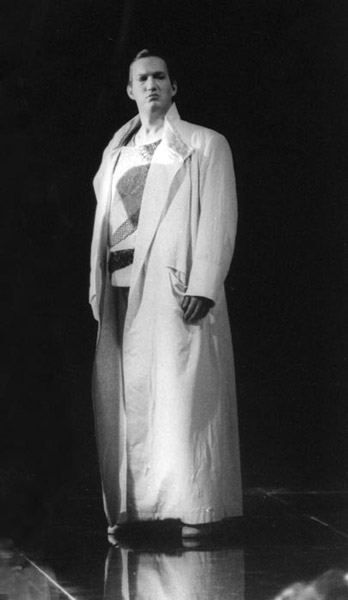
Marek Kalbus, PARSFAL, Teatro Carlo Felice Genova.

== Discography ==
- Hamlet/Boris Godunov (Prokofiev), world premiere recording, Rundfunk-Sinfonieorchester Berlin, Mikhail Jurowski CAPRICCIO 67058
- Eugen Onegin (name part), (Prokofiev), world premiere recording, Rundfunk-Sinfonieorchester Berlin, Mikhail Jurowski CAPRICCIO 67149-50
- The Blacksmith of Marienburg (Siegfried Wagner), world premiere recording, Baltic Philharmonics, Frank Strobel, MARCO POLO 8.225346-48
- Die Zauberflöte (Wolfgang Amadeus Mozart), Würzburger Kammerorchester, Wolfgang Kurz, METRONIC

== Repertoire (selection) ==
- Don Giovanni (Don Giovanni)
- Sarastro and Sprecher (Die Zauberflöte)
- Figaro and Graf Almaviva (Le nozze di Figaro)
- Colline (La Bohème)
- Alidoro (La Cenerentola)
- Alfonso and Guglielmo (Così fan tutte)
- Mephisto (Faust)
- Scarpia (Tosca)
