= Poręba Sobaków =

- Settlement
- Location within Poland
- Coordinates: 51°15′14″N 19°32′47″E
- Country: Poland
- Voivodeship: Łódź
- County: Piotrków
- Gmina: Gorzkowice

Poręba Sobaków [pɔˈrɛmba sɔˈbakuf] is a settlement in the administrative district of Gmina Gorzkowice, within Piotrków County, Łódź Voivodeship, in central Poland.
