= Szczukocice =

- Village
- Location within Poland
- Coordinates: 51°11′34″N 19°34′54″E
- Country: Poland
- Voivodeship: Łódź
- County: Piotrków
- Gmina: Gorzkowice
- Time zone: UTC+1 (CET)
  - Summer (DST): UTC+2 (CEST)
- Vehicle registration: EPI

Szczukocice [ʂt͡ʂukɔˈt͡ɕit͡sɛ] is a village in the administrative district of Gmina Gorzkowice, within Piotrków County, Łódź Voivodeship, in central Poland.

Szczukocice was a private village of Polish nobility, administratively located in the Piotrków County in the Sieradz Voivodeship in the Greater Poland Province of the Kingdom of Poland.
