= Rogów, Piotrków County =

Rogów
- Settlement
- Location within Poland
- Coordinates: 51°09′58″N 19°39′12″E
- Country: Poland
- Voivodeship: Łódź
- County: Piotrków
- Gmina: Gorzkowice

Rogów [ˈrɔɡuf] is a settlement in the administrative district of Gmina Gorzkowice, within Piotrków County, Łódź Voivodeship, in central Poland.
