= Wójtówko =

- Village
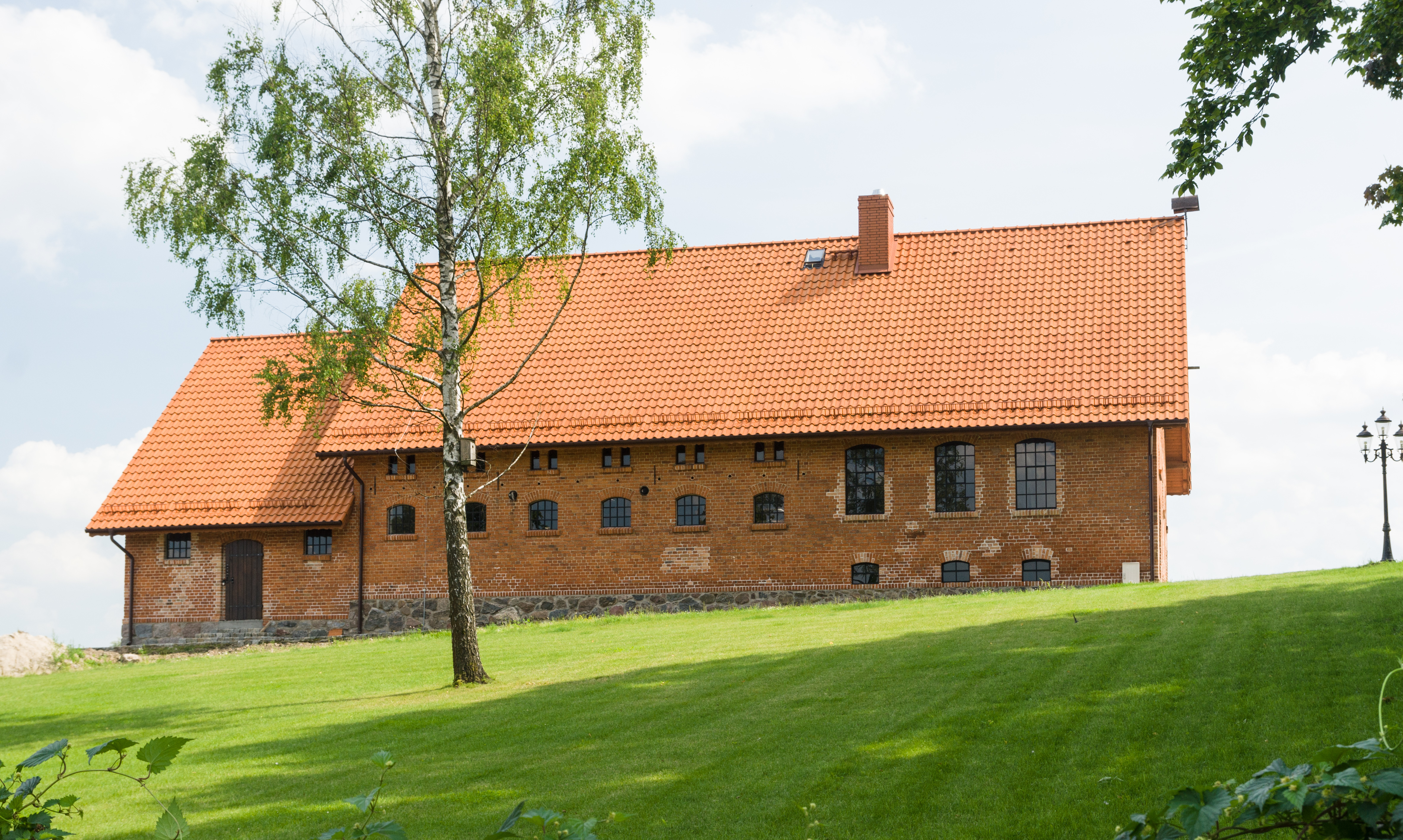

- Location within Poland
- Coordinates: 53°58′59″N 20°43′08″E
- Country: Poland
- Voivodeship: Warmian-Masurian
- County: Olsztyn
- Gmina: Jeziorany

Wójtówko [vui̯ˈtufkɔ] is a village in the administrative district of Gmina Jeziorany, within Olsztyn County, Warmian-Masurian Voivodeship, in northern Poland.

== Notable residents ==
- Hermann Ganswindt (1856-1934), inventor
