= Wola Kotkowska =

- Village
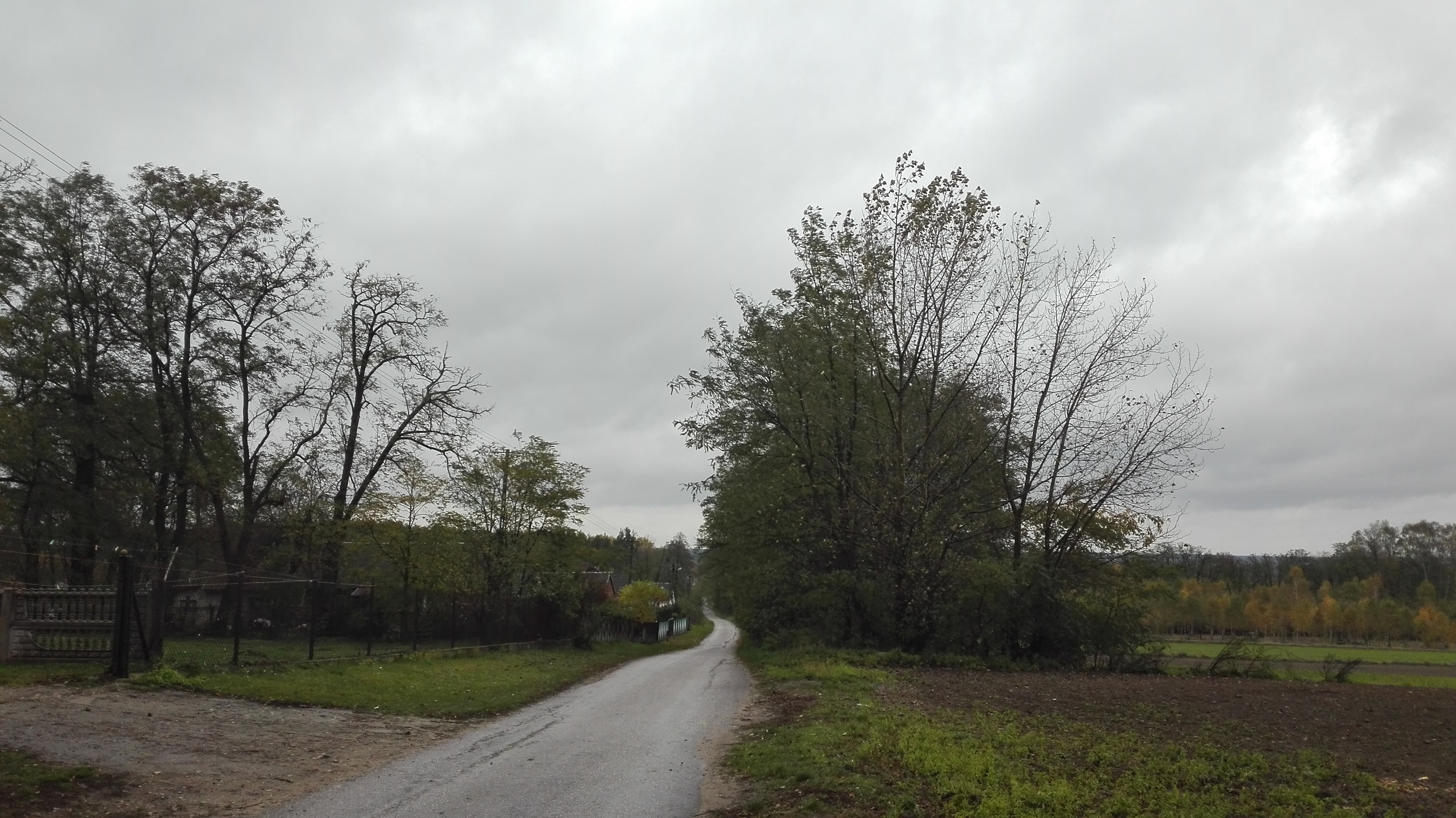

- Location within Poland
- Coordinates: 51°10′N 19°37′E
- Country: Poland
- Voivodeship: Łódź
- County: Piotrków
- Gmina: Gorzkowice

Wola Kotkowska [ˈvɔla kɔtˈkɔfska] is a village in the administrative district of Gmina Gorzkowice, within Piotrków County, Łódź Voivodeship, in central Poland.
