= Kotków, Piotrków County =

Kotków
- Village
- Location within Poland
- Coordinates: 51°11′N 19°37′E
- Country: Poland
- Voivodeship: Łódź
- County: Piotrków
- Gmina: Gorzkowice

Kotków [ˈkɔtkuf] is a village in the administrative district of Gmina Gorzkowice, within Piotrków County, Łódź Voivodeship, in central Poland.

The closest airport in Poland is Częstochowa-Rudniki at a distance of 42 km (26 mi). There are several UNESCO world heritage sites nearby. The closest heritage site in Poland is the Historic Centre of Kraków south of Kotków at a distance of 125 km (78 mi).
