= Kopanina, Piotrków County =

Kopanina
- Settlement
- Location within Poland
- Coordinates: 51°11′42″N 19°38′07″E
- Country: Poland
- Voivodeship: Łódź
- County: Piotrków
- Gmina: Gorzkowice

Kopanina [kɔpaˈnina] is a settlement in the administrative district of Gmina Gorzkowice, within Piotrków County, Łódź Voivodeship, in central Poland.
