= Grabostów, Piotrków County =

Village in Gmina Gorzkowice, Poland

Grabostów
- Village
- Location within Poland
- Coordinates: 51°13′26″N 19°32′26″E
- Country: Poland
- Voivodeship: Łódź
- County: Piotrków
- Gmina: Gorzkowice

Grabostów [ɡraˈbɔstuf] is a village in the administrative district of Gmina Gorzkowice, within Piotrków County, Łódź Voivodeship, in central Poland.
