= Białek (surname) =

Białek is a Polish-language surname. Archaic feminine forms: Białkówna (maiden name), Białkowa (name by husband). Notable people with this surname include:

- Agnieszka Białek (born April 22, 1990), Polish female handballer
- Bartosz Białek (born 11 November 2001), Polish professional footballer
- Janusz Białek (born 10 October 1955), Polish retired football manager and former player
- Jarosław Białek (born 22 February 1981), Polish professional football manager and former player
- William Bialek (born 14 August 1960), American theoretical biophysicist
