= Heidesee =

- Municipality
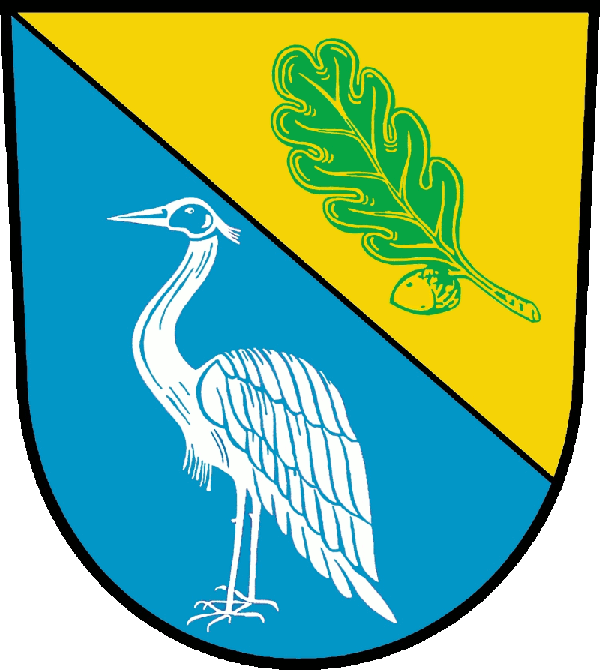
- Coat of arms

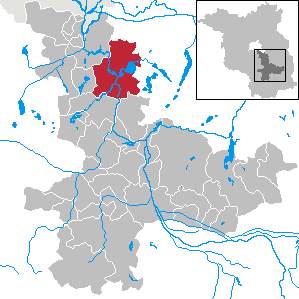
- Location of Heidesee within Dahme-Spreewald district
- Interactive map of Heidesee
- Location within Germany Location within Brandenburg
- Coordinates: 52°16′59″N 13°48′00″E
- Country: Germany
- State: Brandenburg
- District: Dahme-Spreewald
- Subdivisions: 11 Ortsteile

Government
  - Mayor (2019–27): Björn Langner

Area
  - Total: 135.67 km^{2} (52.38 sq mi)
- Elevation: 35 m (115 ft)

Population (2025-12-31)
  - Total: 7,464
  - Density: 55.02/km^{2} (142.5/sq mi)
- Time zone: UTC+01:00 (CET)
  - Summer (DST): UTC+02:00 (CEST)
- Postal codes: 15752, 15754
- Dialling codes: 033763, 033767 ,033768
- Vehicle registration: LDS
- Website: www.heidesee-online.de

Heidesee (German pronunciation: [ˈhaɪdəzeː]) is a municipality in the district of Dahme-Spreewald in Brandenburg, which is located in the eastern part of Germany.

== Demography ==
Development of Population since 1875 within the Current Boundaries (Blue Line: Population; Dotted Line: Comparison to Population Development of Brandenburg state; Grey Background: Time of Nazi rule; Red Background: Time of Communist rule)

Recent Population Development and Projections (Population Development before Census 2011 (blue line); Recent Population Development according to the Census in Germany in 2011 (blue bordered line); Official projections for 2005-2030 (yellow line); for 2020-2030 (green line); for 2017-2030 (scarlet line)

Heidesee: Population development
within the current boundaries (2013)

Year	Pop.	±% p.a.
1875	3,760	—
1890	4,176	+0.70%
1910	4,530	+0.41%
1925	4,745	+0.31%
1933	5,053	+0.79%
1939	5,532	+1.52%
1946	7,152	+3.74%
1950	7,235	+0.29%
1964	6,503	−0.76%
1971	6,403	−0.22%
1981	5,959	−0.72%
1985	5,828	−0.55%
1989	5,683	−0.63%
1990	5,655	−0.49%
1991	5,593	−1.10%

Year	Pop.	±% p.a.
1992	5,550	−0.77%
1993	5,540	−0.18%
1994	5,717	+3.19%
1995	5,750	+0.58%
1996	5,906	+2.71%
1997	6,130	+3.79%
1998	6,554	+6.92%
1999	6,598	+0.67%
2000	6,777	+2.71%
2001	6,886	+1.61%
2002	6,947	+0.89%
2003	7,069	+1.76%
2004	7,021	−0.68%
2005	7,035	+0.20%
2006	7,078	+0.61%

Year	Pop.	±% p.a.
2007	7,082	+0.06%
2008	7,041	−0.58%
2009	7,058	+0.24%
2010	7,039	−0.27%
2011	6,946	−1.32%
2012	6,903	−0.62%
2013	6,864	−0.56%
2014	6,828	−0.52%
2015	6,889	+0.89%
2016	7,071	+2.64%
2017	7,140	+0.98%
2018	7,140	+0.00%
2019	7,091	−0.69%
2020	7,163	+1.02%

== Organization ==
=== Neighbourhoods ===
Heidesee consists of 11 villages, which were united to one town in 2003. These villages are:

- Bindow
- Blossin
- Dannenreich
- Dolgenbrodt
- Friedersdorf
- Gräbendorf
- Gussow
- Kolberg
- Prieros
- Streganz
- Wolzig

=== Coat of arms ===
The coat of arms of the village Gräbendorf is used for entire town, since the unification in 2003. It shows an egret beside a leaf of an oak.

== Culture and sights ==
=== Sights ===
- Heimathaus Prieros (small museum)
- church Prieros
- church Gräbendorf
- landing stage / harbour Heidesee
- Haus des Waldes (house of forest) Gräbendorf

=== Nature ===
- Wolziger See
- natural park Dahme-Heideseen
- landscape conservation area Dubrow
