= Wolziger See =

Lake in Brandenburg, Germany

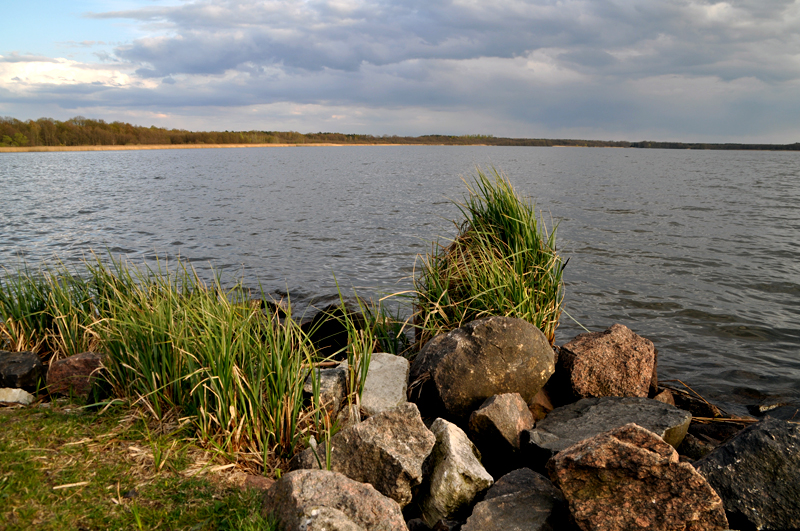

- Location within Brandenburg
- Location: Heidesee, Brandenburg
- Coordinates: 52°15′23″N 13°49′15″E
- Primary inflows: Storkower Kanal, Mühlenfließ
- Basin countries: Germany
- Max. length: 3.2 km (2.0 mi)
- Max. width: 2.5 km (1.6 mi)
- Surface area: 5.79 km^{2} (2.24 sq mi)
- Average depth: 5.5 m (18 ft)
- Max. depth: 13 m (43 ft)
- Water volume: 32,000,000 m^{3} (1.1×10^{9} cu ft)
- Shore length^{1}: ca. 10 km (6.2 mi)
- Surface elevation: 33.7 m (111 ft)
- ^{1} Shore length is not a well-defined measure.

Wolziger See is a lake in Heidesee, Brandenburg, Germany. At an elevation of 33.7 metres (111 ft), its surface covers 5.79 square kilometres (2.24 mi^{2}).

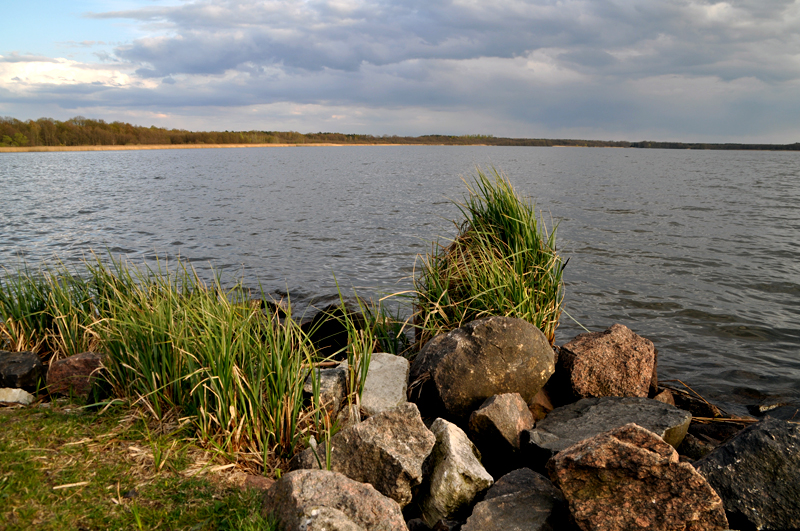
