= Kamienny Most, Łódź Voivodeship =

Settlement in Gmina Gorzkowice, Poland

Kamienny Most
- Settlement
- Location within Poland
- Coordinates: 51°13′57″N 19°36′51″E
- Country: Poland
- Voivodeship: Łódź
- County: Piotrków
- Gmina: Gorzkowice

Kamienny Most [kaˈmjɛnnɨ ˈmɔst] is a settlement in the administrative district of Gmina Gorzkowice, within Piotrków County, Łódź Voivodeship, in central Poland.
