= Gorzkowice =

- Village
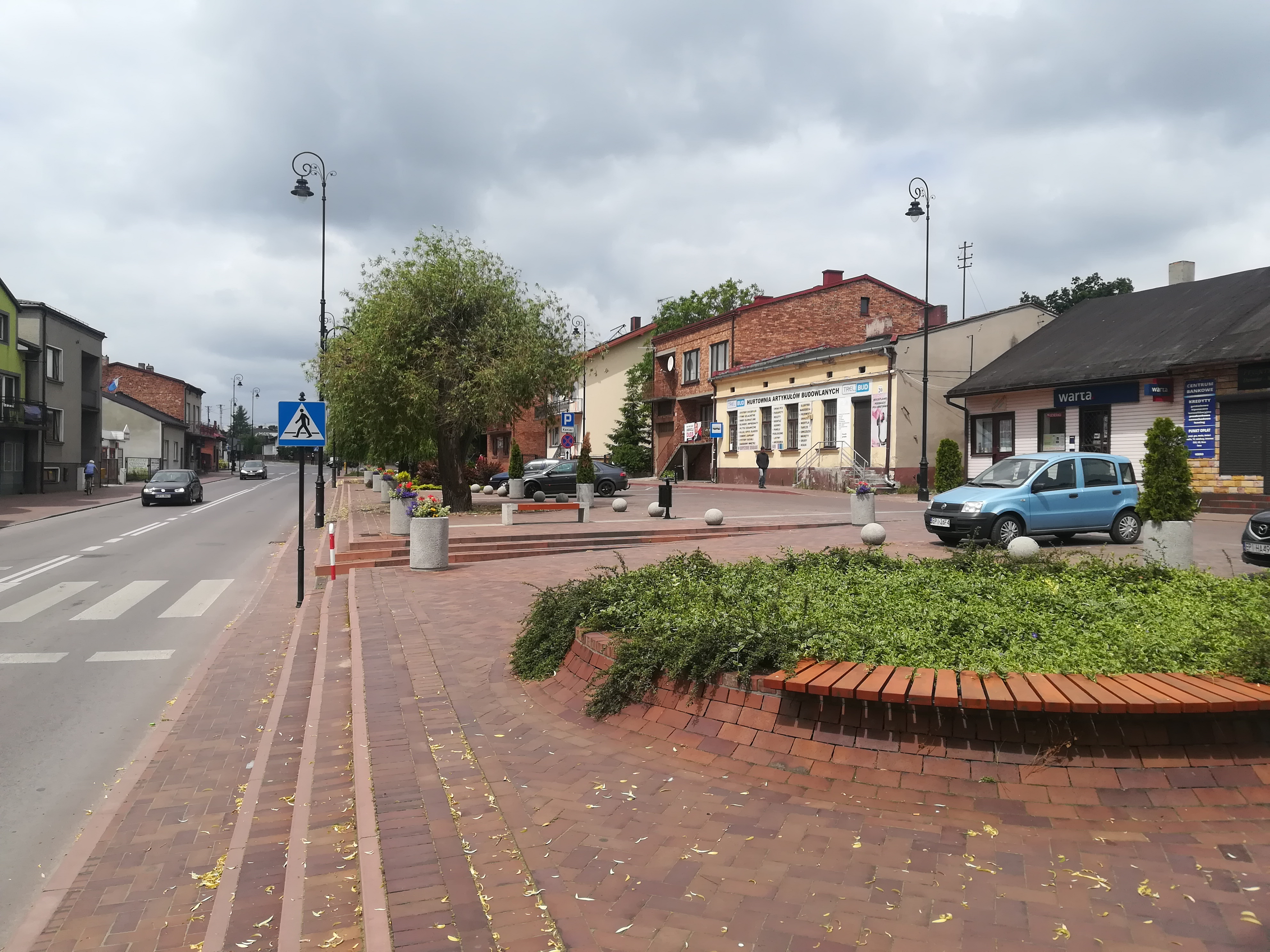
- Rynek (Market Square) in Gorzkowice

- Location within Poland
- Coordinates: 51°13′N 19°36′E
- Country: Poland
- Voivodeship: Łódź
- County: Piotrków
- Gmina: Gorzkowice

Population
  - Total: 3,310
- Time zone: UTC+1 (CET)
  - Summer (DST): UTC+2 (CEST)
- Vehicle registration: EPI
- Website: http://www.gorzkowice.pl

Gorzkowice [ɡɔʂkɔˈvit͡sɛ] is a village in Piotrków County, Łódź Voivodeship, in central Poland. It is the seat of the gmina (administrative district) called Gmina Gorzkowice. It is located in the Sieradz Land.

== History ==
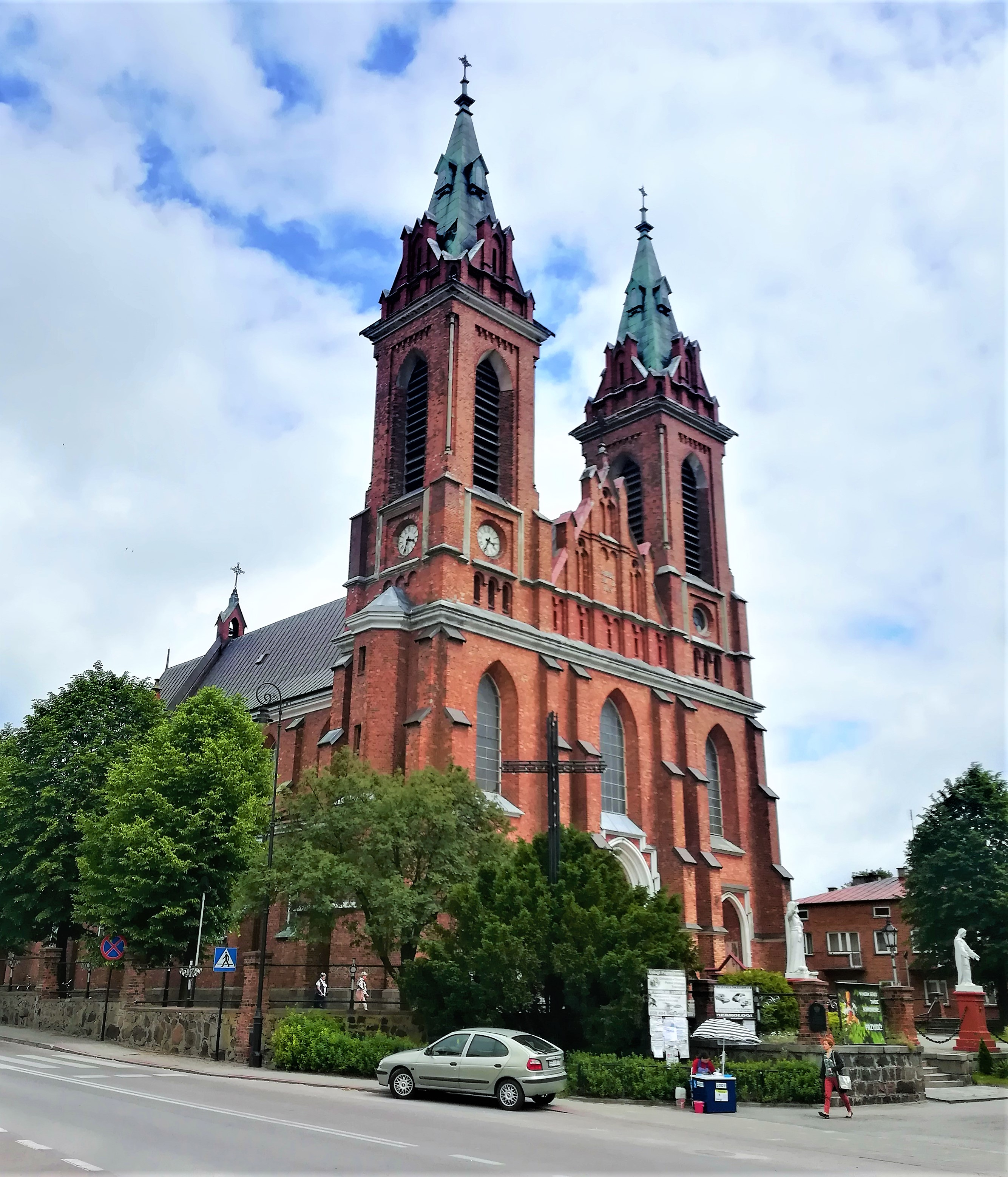
Sacred Heart church

The oldest known mention of the village comes from 1335. The name comes from an Old Polish male name Gorzek. It was a private village of Polish nobility, administratively located in the Piotrków County in the Sieradz Voivodeship in the Greater Poland Province of the Kingdom of Poland.

Following the joint German-Soviet invasion of Poland, which started World War II in September 1939, the village was occupied by Germany until 1945. In September 1944, during the Warsaw Uprising, the Germans deported over 13,000 Varsovians from the Dulag 121 camp in Pruszków, where they were initially imprisoned, to Gorzkowice. Those Poles were mainly old people, ill people and women with children.

In 2008, the village was hit by a tornado which damaged dozens of houses.

== Sports ==
The local sports club is GUKS Gorzkowice with football, table tennis and chess sections.
