= Jadwinów, Łódź Voivodeship =

Jadwinów
- Settlement
- Location within Poland
- Coordinates: 51°15′34″N 19°37′21″E
- Country: Poland
- Voivodeship: Łódź
- County: Piotrków
- Gmina: Gorzkowice

Jadwinów [jadˈvinuf] is a settlement in the administrative district of Gmina Gorzkowice, within Piotrków County, Łódź Voivodeship, in central Poland.
