= Zernsdorf =

Coordinates: 52°17′56″N 13°40′32″E

Zernsdorf is a village in Dahme-Spreewald, Brandenburg, Germany. Since 2003 it has been part of the city of Königs Wusterhausen. The population is approximately 4,500.

== Geography ==
Zernsdorf is situated south-east of Berlin, on the banks of three lakes. The largest of these is the Krüpelsee, which is fed by the Dahme; the other two are the Lankensee and the Ukleisee. The main part of Königs Wusterhausen lies about 5km to the west; the state capital, Potsdam, is about 40km to the north-west.

=== Administrative status ===
From 1965 to 2003 Zernsdorf was divided into three administrative districts: Zernsdorf, Uklei and Kablow-Ziegelei.
