= Borzęcin, Łódź Voivodeship =

Borzęcin
- Village
- Location within Poland
- Coordinates: 51°10′N 19°36′E
- Country: Poland
- Voivodeship: Łódź
- County: Piotrków
- Gmina: Gorzkowice

Borzęcin [bɔˈʐɛnt͡ɕin] is a village in the administrative district of Gmina Gorzkowice, within Piotrków County, Łódź Voivodeship, in central Poland.
