= Königs Wusterhausen =

- Town
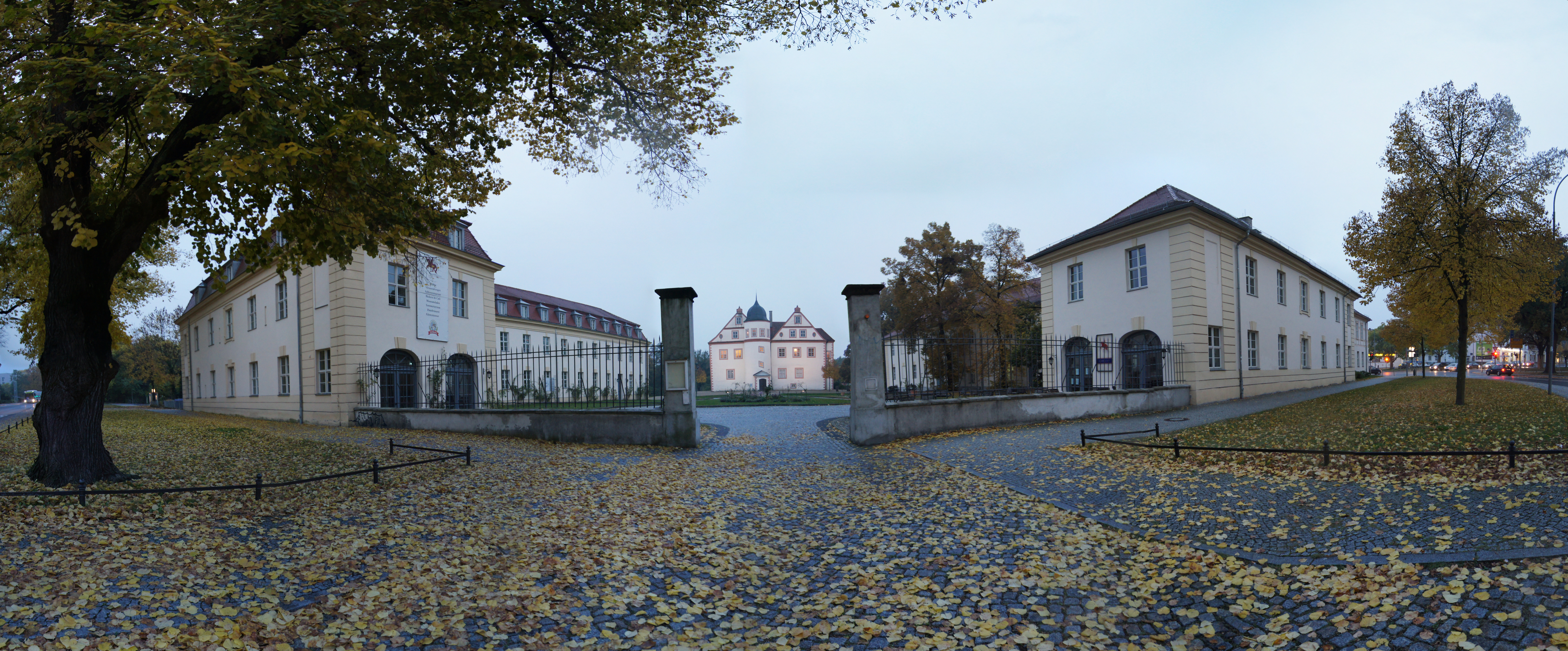
- Königs Wusterhausen Castle

- Coat of arms

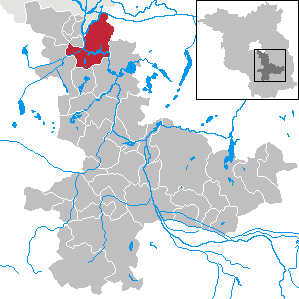
- Location of Königs Wusterhausen within Dahme-Spreewald district
- Interactive map of Königs Wusterhausen
- Location within Germany Location within Brandenburg
- Coordinates: 52°17′30″N 13°37′30″E
- Country: Germany
- State: Brandenburg
- District: Dahme-Spreewald
- Subdivisions: 7 Ortsteile

Government
  - Mayor (2021–29): Michaela Wiezorek

Area
  - Total: 96.04 km^{2} (37.08 sq mi)
- Elevation: 36 m (118 ft)

Population (2025-12-31)
  - Total: 39,590
  - Density: 412.2/km^{2} (1,068/sq mi)
- Time zone: UTC+01:00 (CET)
  - Summer (DST): UTC+02:00 (CEST)
- Postal codes: 15537, 15711, 15751; 15754, 15758
- Dialling codes: 03375
- Vehicle registration: LDS
- Website: www.koenigs-wusterhausen.de

Königs Wusterhausen (German pronunciation: [ˈkøːnɪçs vʊstɐˈhaʊ̯zn̩, ˈkøːnɪk-]; Lower Sorbian: Parsk, pronounced [ˈparsk]) is a town in the Dahme-Spreewald district of the state of Brandenburg in Germany a few kilometers outside Berlin.

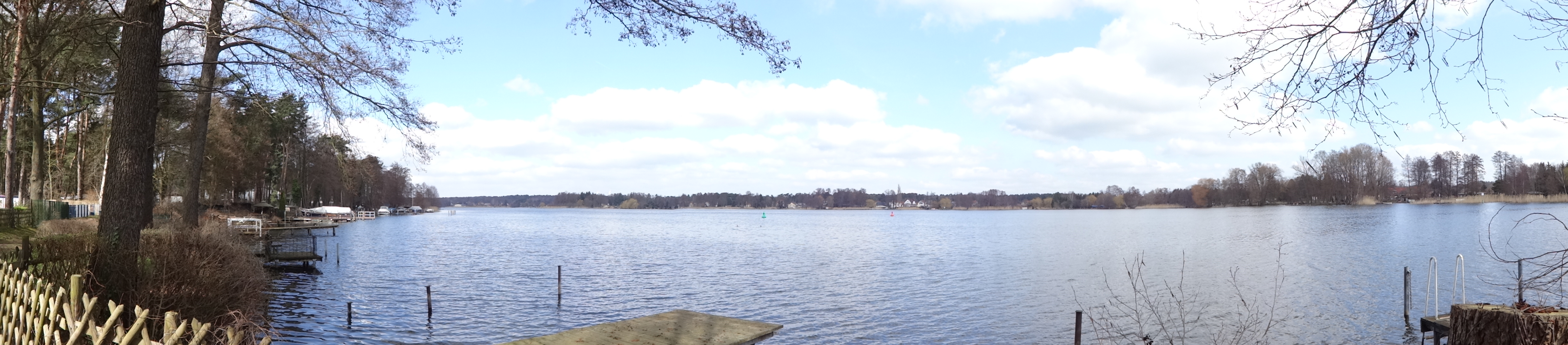
View over Krüpellake

== Geography ==
=== Geographical location ===
Königs Wusterhausen – locally known as "KW" (German pronunciation: [ˈkaː ˈveː]) or "KWh" (German pronunciation: [ˈkaː ˈveː 'ha:])– lies on the Notte canal and the river Dahme southeast of Berlin. Much further away to the west lies the state capital Potsdam.

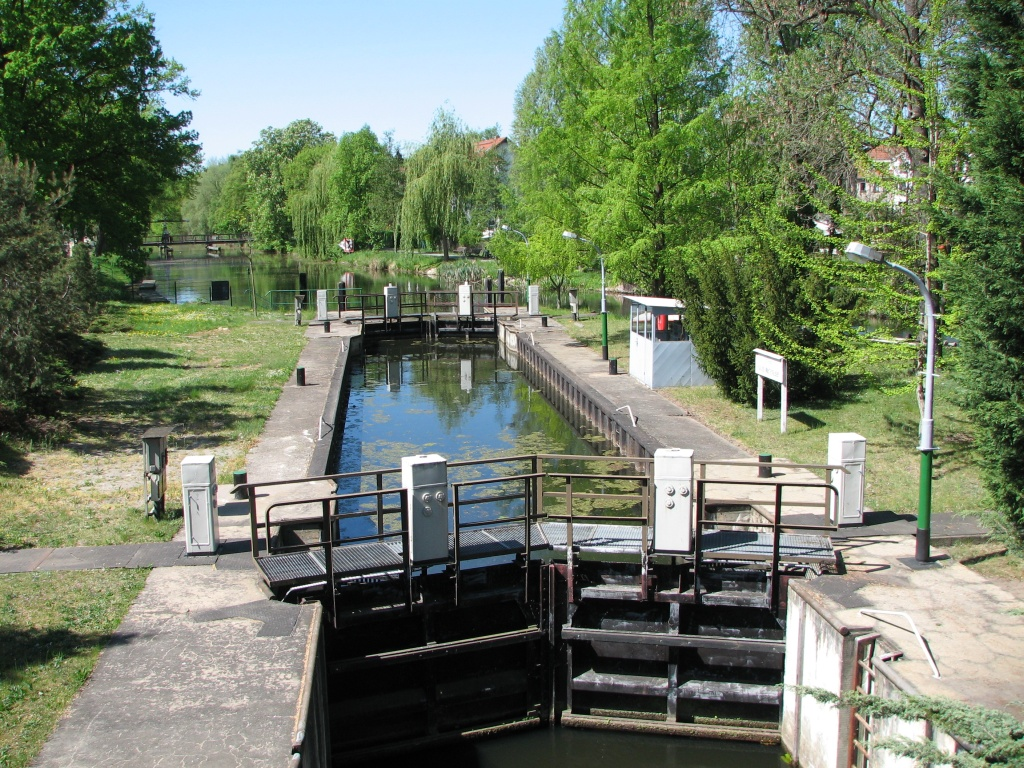
Notte canal in Königs Wusterhausen

The abbreviation "KW" is also a reminder of the Königs Wusterhausen radio transmitter as "KW" is also the abbreviation for "Kilowatt" and "Kurzwelle" (German: "Shortwave").

=== Parts of town ===
Königs Wusterhausen is the biggest town in the Dahme-Spreewald district. The municipal reforms in 2003 brought about seven amalgamations, since which time the communities of Zeesen, Kablow, Diepensee, Niederlehme, Senzig, Wernsdorf and Zernsdorf have belonged to Königs Wusterhausen, the town's land area has grown sixfold, and its population has doubled.

=== Demography ===
Development of population since 1875 within the current boundaries (blue line: population; dotted line: comparison to population development of Brandenburg state; grey background: time of Nazi rule; red background: time of communist rule)

Recent population development and projections (population development before census 2011 (blue line); recent population development according to the Census in Germany in 2011 (blue bordered line); official projections for 2005-2030 (yellow line); for 2020-2030 (green line); for 2017-2030 (scarlet line)

Königs Wusterhausen: Population development
within the current boundaries (2017)

Year	Pop.	±% p.a.
1875	5,033	—
1890	6,030	+1.21%
1910	12,062	+3.53%
1925	13,159	+0.58%
1933	15,494	+2.06%
1939	19,286	+3.72%
1946	20,902	+1.16%
1950	21,320	+0.50%
1964	23,155	+0.59%
1971	24,728	+0.94%
1981	29,078	+1.63%
1985	30,738	+1.40%
1989	30,176	−0.46%
1990	29,717	−1.52%
1991	29,123	−2.00%

Year	Pop.	±% p.a.
1992	29,223	+0.34%
1993	29,033	−0.65%
1994	29,145	+0.39%
1995	29,447	+1.04%
1996	29,903	+1.55%
1997	30,095	+0.64%
1998	30,473	+1.26%
1999	30,969	+1.63%
2000	31,522	+1.79%
2001	31,909	+1.23%
2002	32,161	+0.79%
2003	32,335	+0.54%
2004	32,785	+1.39%
2005	33,092	+0.94%
2006	33,201	+0.33%

Year	Pop.	±% p.a.
2007	33,370	+0.51%
2008	33,400	+0.09%
2009	33,762	+1.08%
2010	33,981	+0.65%
2011	33,747	−0.69%
2012	33,975	+0.68%
2013	34,240	+0.78%
2014	34,795	+1.62%
2015	35,765	+2.79%
2016	36,468	+1.97%
2017	36,706	+0.65%
2018	37,190	+1.32%
2019	37,639	+1.21%
2020	38,111	+1.25%

== History ==
In 1320, in connection with an investiture on 19 September, the settlement ("hus to wosterhusen") and the castle received their first-known documentary mentions. By 1400, the two were both a fiefdom held by the noble family of Schlieben. In 1500 the estate of Wendisch Wusterhausen was verified for the first time by the Schenken (a noble title) of Landberg zu Teupitz.

On 14 October 1669 Privy Councillor Friedrich von Jena acquired the castle and the village of Wendisch Wusterhausen. In early July 1683, Kurprinz Friedrich, later (1688) Elector Friedrich III, and later still (1701) King Frederick I in Prussia, acquired the castle and the village. In 1698, Kurprinz Friedrich Wilhelm was given the castle along with the attached estate as a gift by his father. After his accession to the throne, King Frederick William I in Prussia, remodelled the castle into a hunting lodge, which his son Frederick II (Frederick the Great) despised. In 1718, the town, hitherto known as Wusterhausen, was given its current name, Königs Wusterhausen ("Königs" = "king's" in German).

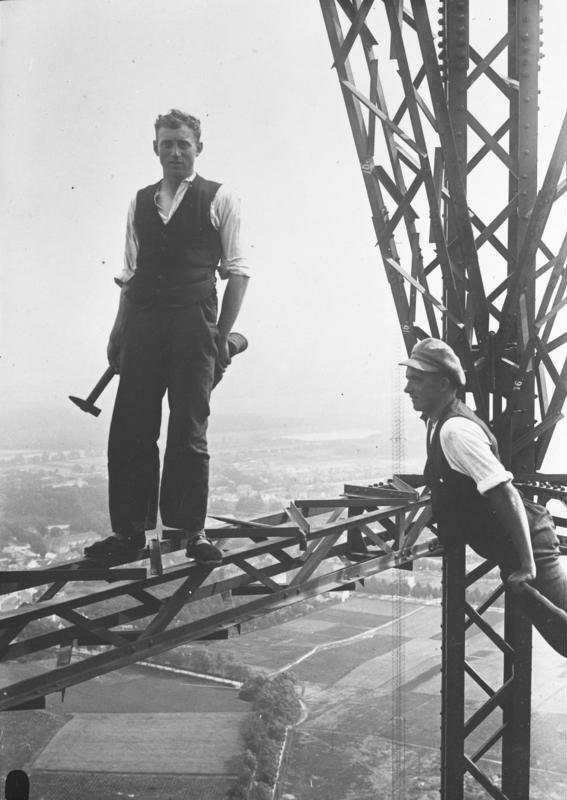
Checking the radio transmitter tower, 1930

In 1862, novelist and poet Theodor Fontane visited Königs Wusterhausen for his Wanderungen durch die Mark Brandenburg.

Since 1901, Königs Wusterhausen has been home to the Brandenburg School for the Blind and Visually Impaired (Brandenburgische Schule für Blinde und Sehbehinderte), endowed by the Hamburg merchant Hermann Schmidt.

In 1920 came the launch of Germany's first radio transmitter, the Transmitter Königs Wusterhausen, and in 1935, Königs Wusterhausen was raised to town status. In 1937, Saint Elisabeth's Catholic Church was built and consecrated.

In 1938, the Berlin Autobahn ringroad – now Bundesautobahn 10 – was dedicated, and now serves cities and towns around Berlin, including Königs Wusterhausen. By now, the National Socialists were in power, and in 1944 they built a concentration camp for Jews and Poles at the railway goods station.

After the Second World War and until 1990, Königs Wusterhausen lay in the former East Germany.

In 1972, Germany's deadliest-ever aviation accident occurred when an Interflug passenger flight crashed near Königs Wusterhausen, killing 156 people. 1972 also saw the collapse of Königs Wusterhausen's central tower, which at 243 m tall was the most prominent structure at the radio transmission facility.

=== Worship ===
==== Christianity ====
In Königs Wusterhausen, there is a Catholic parish as well as congregations of the Protestant church body named Evangelical Church of Berlin-Brandenburg-Silesian Upper Lusatia. The oldest church in town is the village Wehrkirche (a church whose architecture contains typically military elements) in Deutsch Wusterhausen, built in the 13th century. In 1998 the Evangelical Königs Wusterhausen deanery (German: Kirchenkreis) merged in the Berlin-Neukölln deanery. The Protestant congregations in Königs Wusterhausen (KW), Deutsch Wusterhausen, Niederlehme, Senzig, Zeesen, and Zernsdorf (all components of KW) as well as that in Schenkendorf (a component of Mittenwalde), today make up the ecclesiastical Region 9.

The Catholic parish belongs to the Deanship of Köpenick-Treptow of the Archdiocese of Berlin. Both communities have very active youth groups, the Evangelical Junge Gemeinde ("Young Community") and the Katholische Jugend ("Catholic Youth").

In January 2013, the Freie Baptistengemeinde Königs Wusterhausen was organized. They are located near the post office and hold weekly services as well as other Bible studies including "Jungschar" and a monthly "Jugendtreff".

== Politics ==
=== City council ===
Königs Wusterhausen's town council consists of 36 councillors, with the mayor (Bürgermeister) as head. According to the results of the latest local election in May 2019, they were apportioned as follows:

- Social Democratic Party (SPD) – 8 seats
- Christian Democratic Union (CDU) – 5 seats
- Alternative for Germany (AfD) – 5 seats
- The Left (Linke) – 5 seats
- Free Voters (citizens' coalition) (FWKW) – 4 seats
- Wir für KW (WfKW) – 3 seats
- Alliance 90/The Greens – 3 seats
- Free Democratic Party (FDP) – 1
- Other – 4 seats

== Twin towns – sister cities ==
Königs Wusterhausen is twinned with:

- Příbram, Czech Republic
- Germantown, United States
- Hückeswagen, Germany
- Steglitz-Zehlendorf (Berlin), Germany

== Culture and sightseeing ==
=== Buildings ===
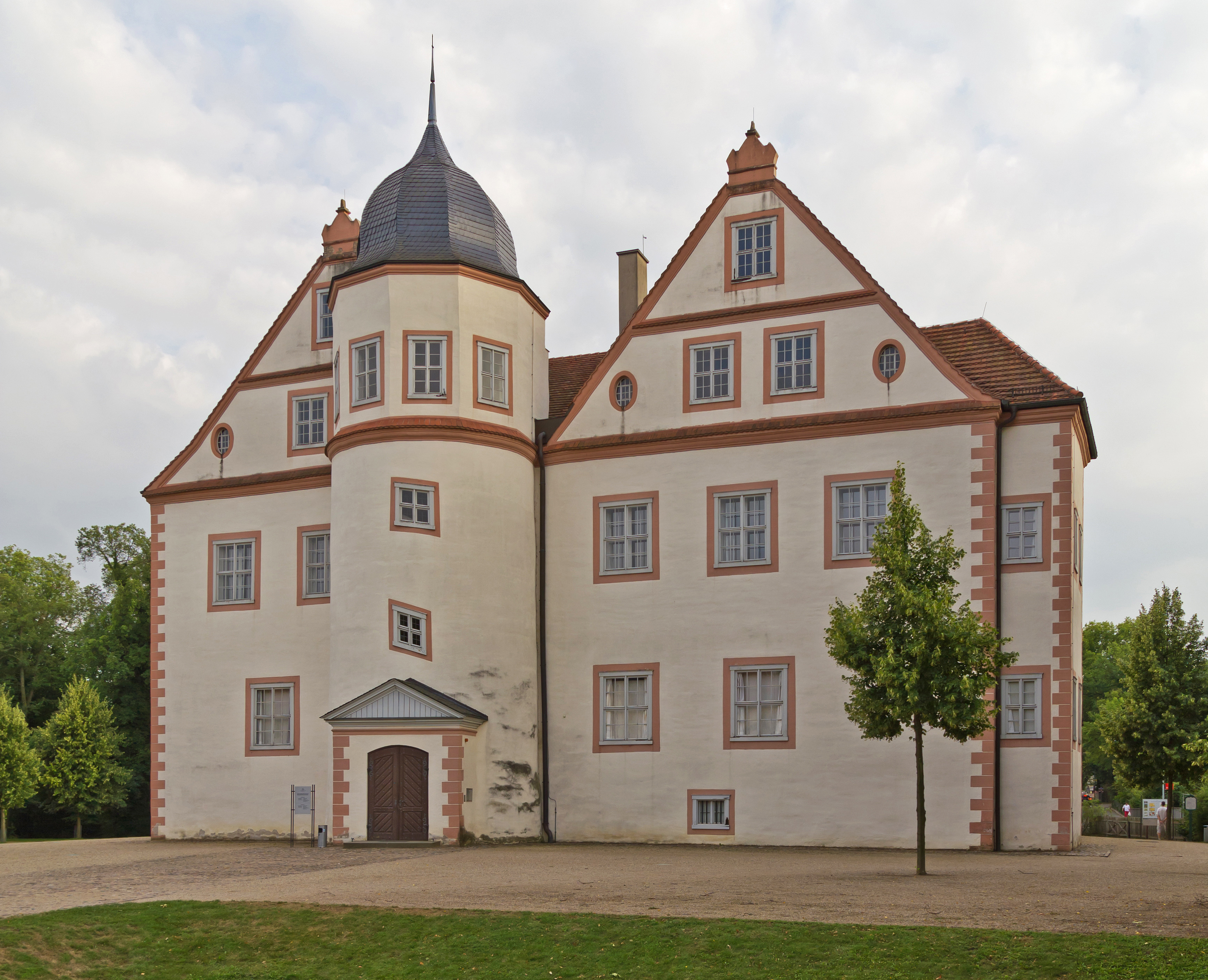
Schloss in Königs Wusterhausen

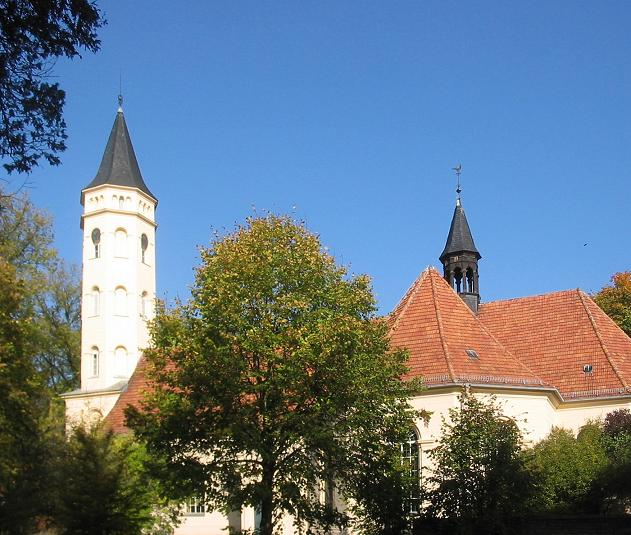
Cross Church

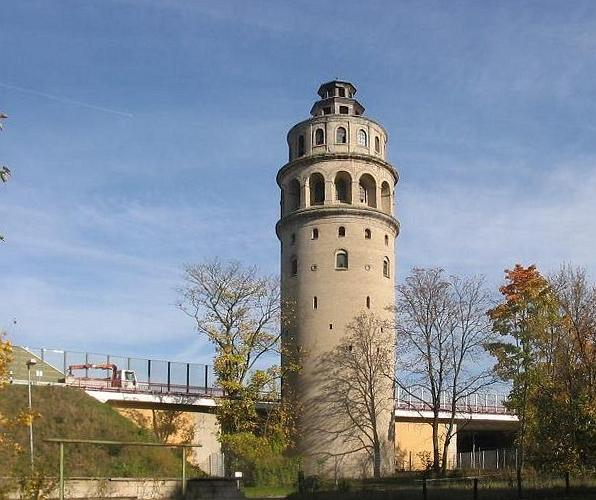
Water tower

- Königs Wusterhausen Hunting Lodge and Garden, known as Prussian King Frederick William's favourite place to stay. Today the castle is a museum of the Prussian Palaces and Gardens Foundation Berlin-Brandenburg. Numerous valuable objects of baroque paintings and handicrafts are on display, including paintings with connections to Frederick William and his family, many pieces of the original interior, as well as a large collection of portraits, mainly of officers, which the "soldier king" painted himself.
- Kreuzkirche ("Cross Church"), begun in 1693, new glazing in 1949 with 3 choir windows and 4 ornamental round panes by Charles Crodel.
- Neue Mühle ("New Mill") Canal lock (first documented in 1739), difference in levels 1.50 m
- Watertower (begun 1910, shut down 1965), now a café with beer garden and exhibition areas
- 210-metre transmission mast (built 1925)

=== Museums ===
- Königs Wusterhausen Transmission and Radio Technology Museum on the Funkerberg

Of the once great number of building works on the Funkerberg ("Transmitter Mountain"), very little is preserved nowadays, as many transmission towers were dismantled for technical reasons after the Central Tower collapsed and fell on 15 November 1972. Today, only a 210-m-high mast and two small freestanding towers are found there. It along with the remaining buildings form a technological monument. Until 1999, this mast bore the transmitting antenna that served as the reserve antenna for the longwave stations at Zehlendorf bei Oranienburg and Donebach.

In 1994, a 67-m-high precast concrete cellular transmission tower was put up. It is today the only active transmitter on the Funkerberg.

The first attempts at transmissions were in 1908. On 22 December 1920, music and speech were transmitted wirelessly from the Funkerberg for the first time on "Welle 2400" – longwave. It went down in history as the German postal system's Christmas concert. Königs Wusterhausen is thus also said to be the cradle of German radio. The artists in that broadcast were, incidentally, postal employees. The initiative was German radio pioneer Hans Bredow's brainchild (for this and other groundbreaking work, he is considered the "Father of German Radio").

Until 1926, the popular Sonntagskonzerte ("Sunday Concerts") were broadcast. The station's studio was at first a remodelled bathroom in the first broadcasting house on the Funkerberg.

== Economy and infrastructure ==
=== Transport ===
- Railway (Königs Wusterhausen regional trains (RE2 RB22, 24, 36) and S-Bahn •S46 to Westkreuz• station)
- Autobahns/ Freeways: A 10 (Berliner Ring), A 13
- Highways: Bundesstraße (Federal highway) 179 (B 179)
- Air travel: Berlin-Brandenburg International Airport (BER)
- Waterways: Königs Wusterhausen inland port.

== Notable people ==
- Heinrich Mederow (born 1945), rower, bronze medalist at the 1972 Olympics
- Marek Kalbus (born 1969), opera and concert singer
- Sandra Keller (born 1973), actress
- Mike Jesse (born 1973), footballer
- Sabine Jünger (born 1973), politician (The Left)
- Judith Arndt (born 1976), cyclist
