= Szynczyce =

- Village
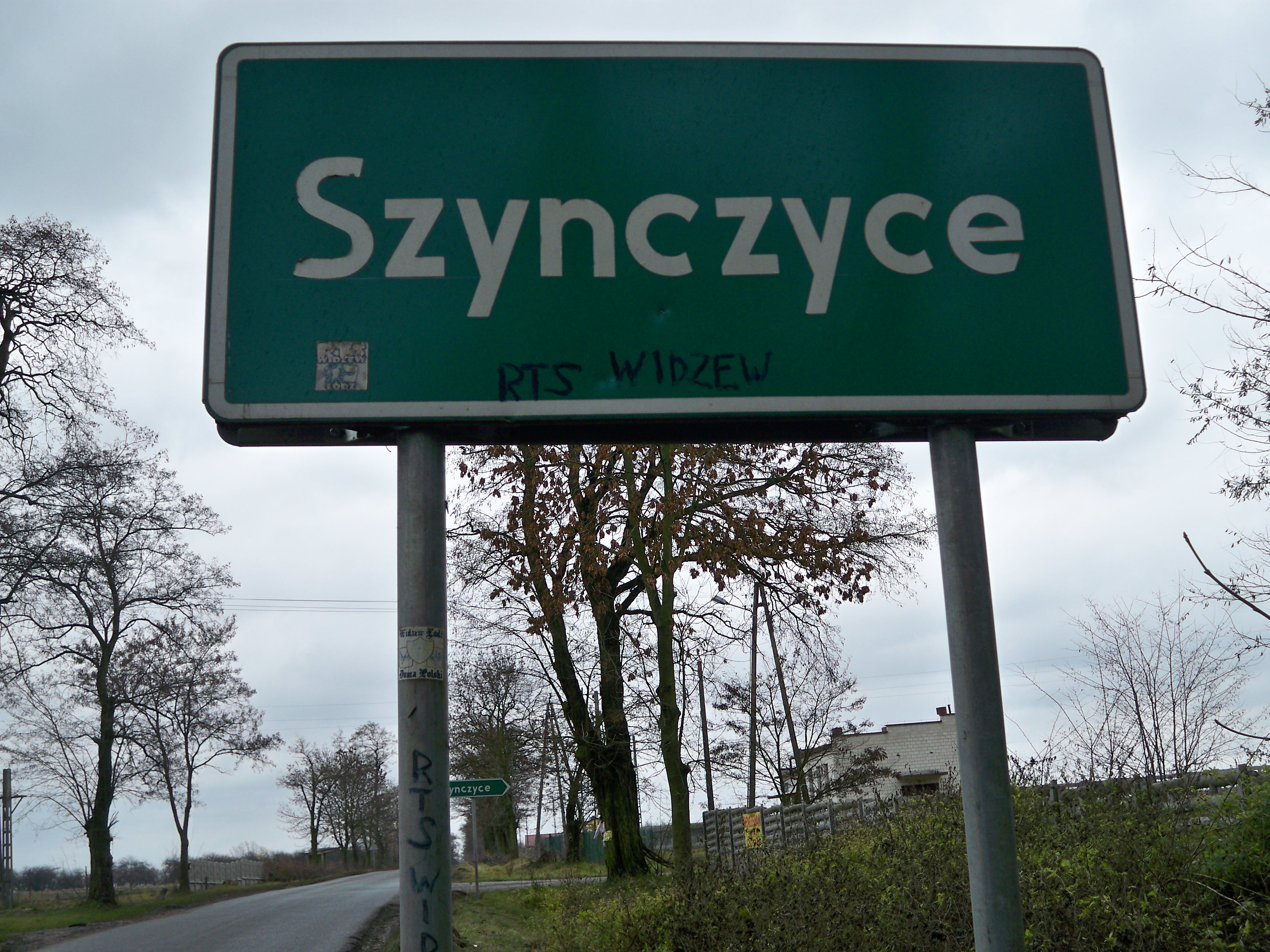

- Location within Poland
- Coordinates: 51°35′N 19°39′E
- Country: Poland
- Voivodeship: Łódź
- County: Piotrków
- Gmina: Czarnocin

Szynczyce [ʂɨnˈt͡ʂɨt͡sɛ] is a village in the administrative district of Gmina Czarnocin, within Piotrków County, Łódź Voivodeship, in central Poland.

== Founding ==
Earliest known mention of the village of Szynczyce dates to the fourteenth century. Nobleman Vincentius is mentioned as owner in 1386 and Laurentius is mentioned in 1388. In 1552, records suggest "Sinczice" was half owned by nobleman Jan Rogozinski, half owned by the castellan of Rozprza. As a tithe, Szynczyce waged one part of its annual wheat harvest to the vicar of Czarnocin, the rest to the canon of Gniezno.

The Bogusławski and Chrzanowski families administered Szynczyce in the nineteenth century, which by the last decade consisted of 24 dwellings and a population of 284. Adam Chrzanowski of Kozietuły, of the Poraj clan, managed the property until 1884. He was son of Ignacy and Zuzanna of Zarębów. Chrzanowski's wife, Leonida (of the Krzysztoporskis’), was daughter of Benedict Bogusławski. Teodor Chrzanowski, heir of the Podstole and Cieśle estates in Piotrków, also managed the Szynczyce manor following Adam Chrzanowski's death. The property was 647 hectares (1,599 acres).
