= Kuźnica Żerechowska =

- Village
- Location within Poland
- Coordinates: 51°13′45″N 19°42′06″E
- Country: Poland
- Voivodeship: Łódź
- County: Piotrków
- Gmina: Łęki Szlacheckie

Kuźnica Żerechowska (Polish pronunciation: [kuʑˈɲit͡sa ʐɛrɛˈxɔfska]) is a village in the administrative district of Gmina Łęki Szlacheckie, within Piotrków County, Łódź Voivodeship, in central Poland.
