= Stanisławów, Gmina Łęki Szlacheckie =

Stanisławów
- Village
- Location within Poland
- Coordinates: 51°12′21″N 19°45′33″E
- Country: Poland
- Voivodeship: Łódź
- County: Piotrków
- Gmina: Łęki Szlacheckie

Stanisławów [staniˈswavuf] is a village in the administrative district of Gmina Łęki Szlacheckie, within Piotrków County, Łódź Voivodeship, in central Poland.
