= Ogrodzona, Piotrków County =

Ogrodzona
- Village
- Location within Poland
- Coordinates: 51°11′25″N 19°46′38″E
- Country: Poland
- Voivodeship: Łódź
- County: Piotrków
- Gmina: Łęki Szlacheckie

Ogrodzona [ɔɡrɔˈd͡zɔna] is a village in the administrative district of Gmina Łęki Szlacheckie, within Piotrków County, Łódź Voivodeship, in central Poland.
