= Bęczkowice =

- Village
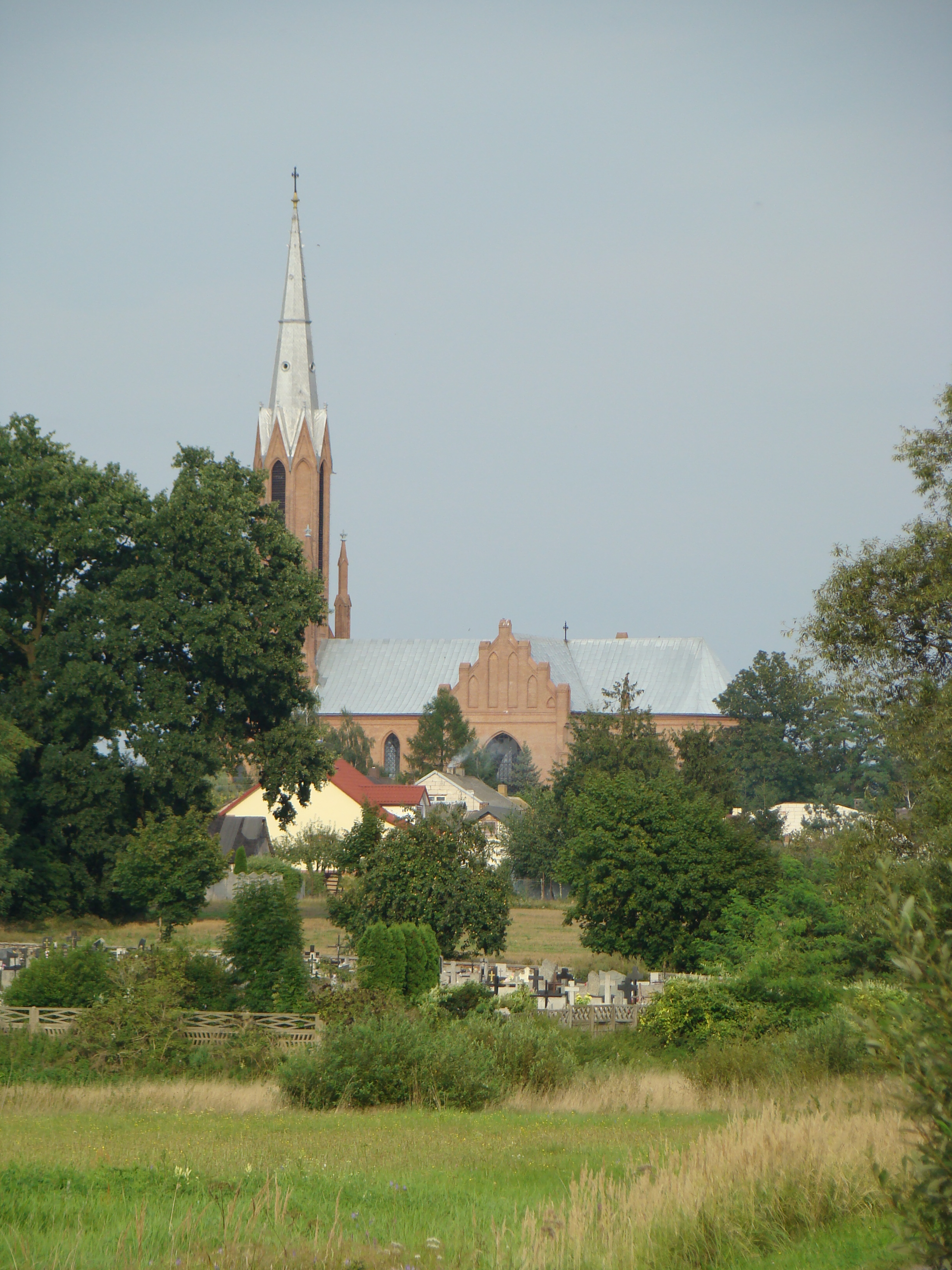

- Location within Poland
- Coordinates: 51°12′N 19°43′E
- Country: Poland
- Voivodeship: Łódź
- County: Piotrków
- Gmina: Łęki Szlacheckie

Bęczkowice [bɛnt͡ʂkɔˈvit͡sɛ] is a village in the administrative district of Gmina Łęki Szlacheckie, within Piotrków County, Łódź Voivodeship, in central Poland.
