= Kolonia Ręczno =

- Village
- Location within Poland
- Coordinates: 51°11′N 19°52′E
- Country: Poland
- Voivodeship: Łódź
- County: Piotrków
- Gmina: Ręczno

Kolonia Ręczno [kɔˈlɔɲa ˈrɛnt͡ʂnɔ] is a village in the administrative district of Gmina Ręczno, within Piotrków County, Łódź Voivodeship, in central Poland.
