= Kolonia Tomawa =

- Village
- Location within Poland
- Coordinates: 51°13′50″N 19°47′51″E
- Country: Poland
- Voivodeship: Łódź
- County: Piotrków
- Gmina: Łęki Szlacheckie

Kolonia Tomawa [kɔˈlɔɲa tɔˈmava] is a village in the administrative district of Gmina Łęki Szlacheckie, within Piotrków County, Łódź Voivodeship, in central Poland.
