= Żerechowa =

- Village
- Location within Poland
- Coordinates: 51°14′N 19°45′E
- Country: Poland
- Voivodeship: Łódź
- County: Piotrków
- Gmina: Łęki Szlacheckie
- Population: 254

Żerechowa [ʐɛrɛˈxɔva] is a village in the administrative district of Gmina Łęki Szlacheckie, within Piotrków County, Łódź Voivodeship, in central Poland.
