= Wielkopole =

Wielkopole may refer to the following places:

- Wielkopole, Łódź Voivodeship (central Poland)
- Wielkopole, Krasnystaw County in Lublin Voivodeship (east Poland)
- Wielkopole, Włodawa County in Lublin Voivodeship (east Poland)
- Wielkopole, Jędrzejów County in Świętokrzyskie Voivodeship (south-central Poland)
- Wielkopole, Włoszczowa County in Świętokrzyskie Voivodeship (south-central Poland)
- Wielkopole, Greater Poland Voivodeship (west-central Poland)
