= Wykno, Piotrków County =

Wykno
- Village
- Location within Poland
- Coordinates: 51°15′N 19°48′E
- Country: Poland
- Voivodeship: Łódź
- County: Piotrków
- Gmina: Łęki Szlacheckie

Wykno [ˈvɨknɔ] is a village in the administrative district of Gmina Łęki Szlacheckie, within Piotrków County, Łódź Voivodeship, in central Poland.
