= Dąbrowa, Piotrków County =

Dąbrowa
- Village
- Location within Poland
- Coordinates: 51°09′27″N 19°50′18″E
- Country: Poland
- Voivodeship: Łódź
- County: Piotrków
- Gmina: Łęki Szlacheckie

Dąbrowa [dɔmˈbrɔva] is a village in the administrative district of Gmina Łęki Szlacheckie, within Piotrków County, Łódź Voivodeship, in central Poland.
