= Dalków =

Dalków may refer to the following places in Poland:

- Dalków, Lower Silesian Voivodeship (south-west Poland)
- Dalków, Łódź Voivodeship (central Poland)
