= Bąkowa Góra =

- Village
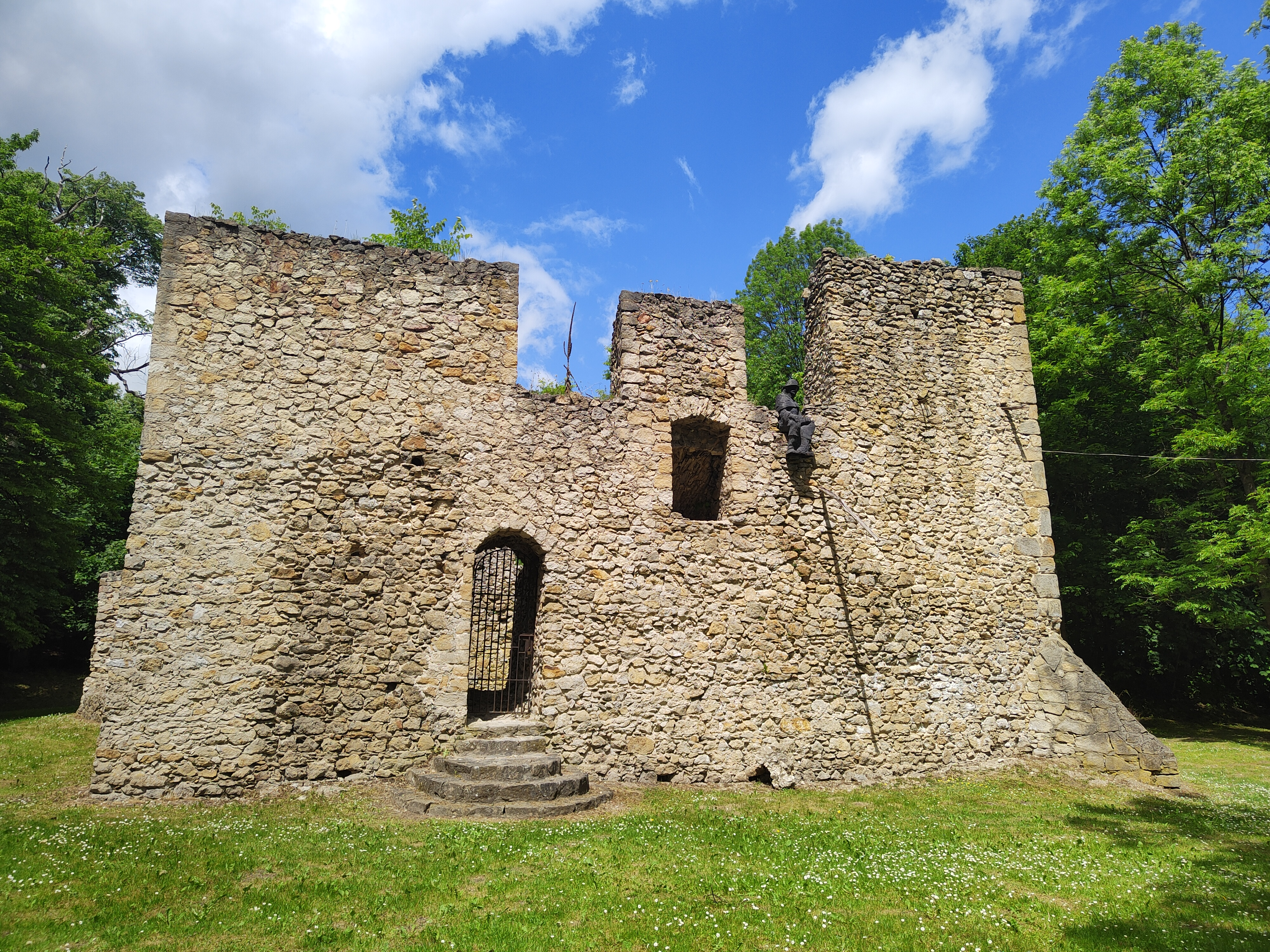
- Ruins of the medieval castle

- Location within Poland
- Coordinates: 51°8′24″N 19°51′51″E
- Country: Poland
- Voivodeship: Łódź
- County: Piotrków
- Gmina: Ręczno
- Time zone: UTC+1 (CET)
  - Summer (DST): UTC+2 (CEST)
- Postal code: 97-510
- Vehicle registration: EPI

Bąkowa Góra [bɔŋˈkɔva ˈɡura] is a village in the administrative district of Gmina Ręczno, within Piotrków County, Łódź Voivodeship, in central Poland.
