= Grabina Wola =

- Village
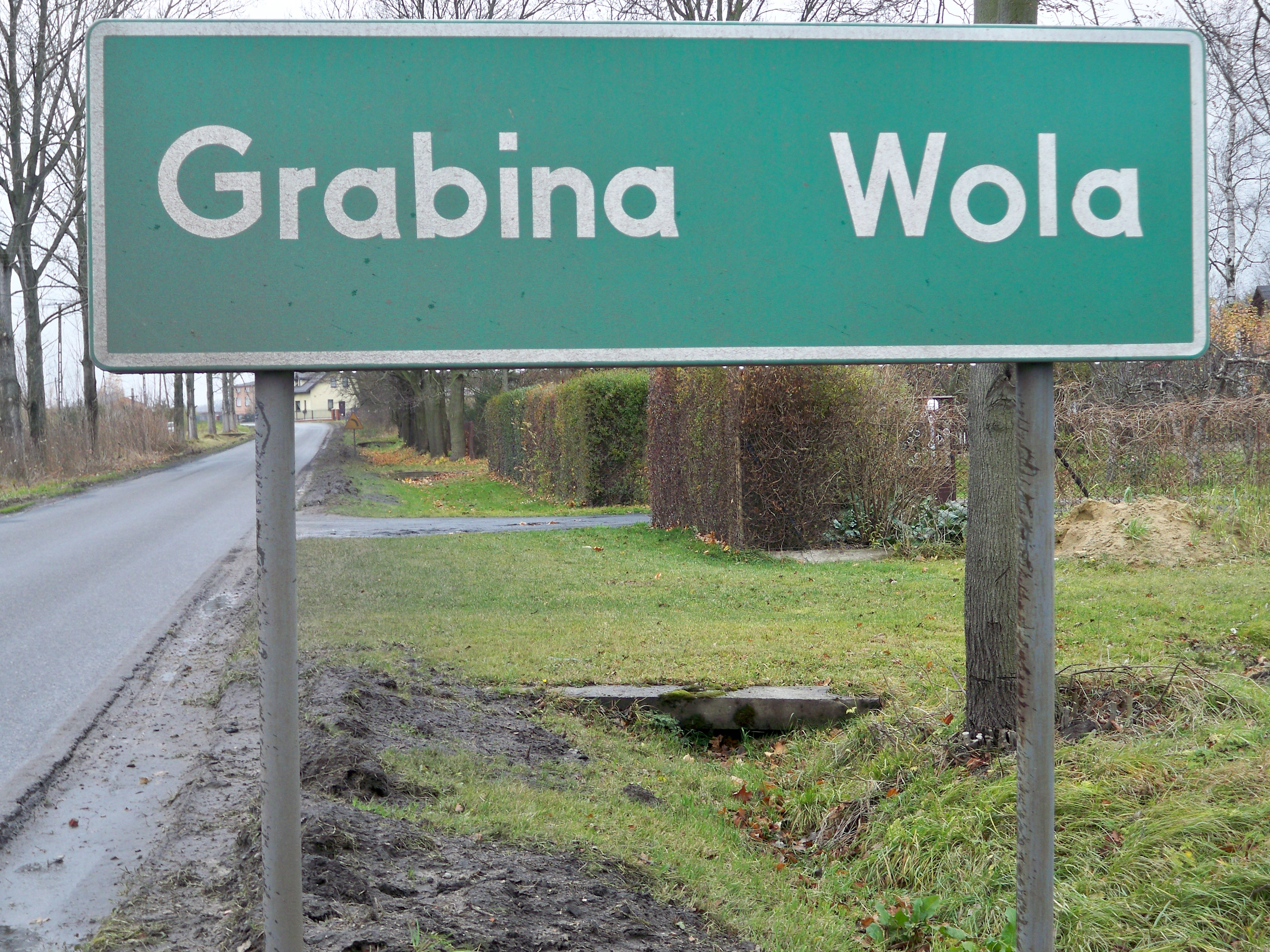

- Location within Poland
- Coordinates: 51°35′N 19°37′E
- Country: Poland
- Voivodeship: Łódź
- County: Piotrków
- Gmina: Czarnocin

Grabina Wola [ɡraˈbina ˈvɔla] is a village in the administrative district of Gmina Czarnocin, within Piotrków County, Łódź Voivodeship, in central Poland.
