= Majkowice =

Majkowice may refer to the following places:

- Majkowice, Bochnia County in Lesser Poland Voivodeship (south Poland)
- Majkowice, Proszowice County in Lesser Poland Voivodeship (south Poland)
- Majkowice, Łódź Voivodeship (central Poland)
