= Górale =

Górale may refer to:

- Gorals, a group of people indigenous to Polish, Czech and Slovak mountain areas
- Górale, Kuyavian-Pomeranian Voivodeship (north-central Poland)
- Górale, Łódź Voivodeship (central Poland)
