= Stobnica-Piła =

- Village
- Location within Poland
- Coordinates: 51°15′02″N 19°50′09″E
- Country: Poland
- Voivodeship: Łódź
- County: Piotrków
- Gmina: Ręczno

Stobnica-Piła [stɔbˈnit͡sa ˈpiwa] is a village in the administrative district of Gmina Ręczno, within Piotrków County, Łódź Voivodeship, in central Poland.
