= Adamów, Gmina Łęki Szlacheckie =

Adamów
- Village
- Location within Poland
- Coordinates: 51°9′18″N 19°44′47″E
- Country: Poland
- Voivodeship: Łódź
- County: Piotrków
- Gmina: Łęki Szlacheckie

Adamów [aˈdamuf] is a village in the administrative district of Gmina Łęki Szlacheckie, within Piotrków County, Łódź Voivodeship, in central Poland.
