= Dobrenice =

- Village
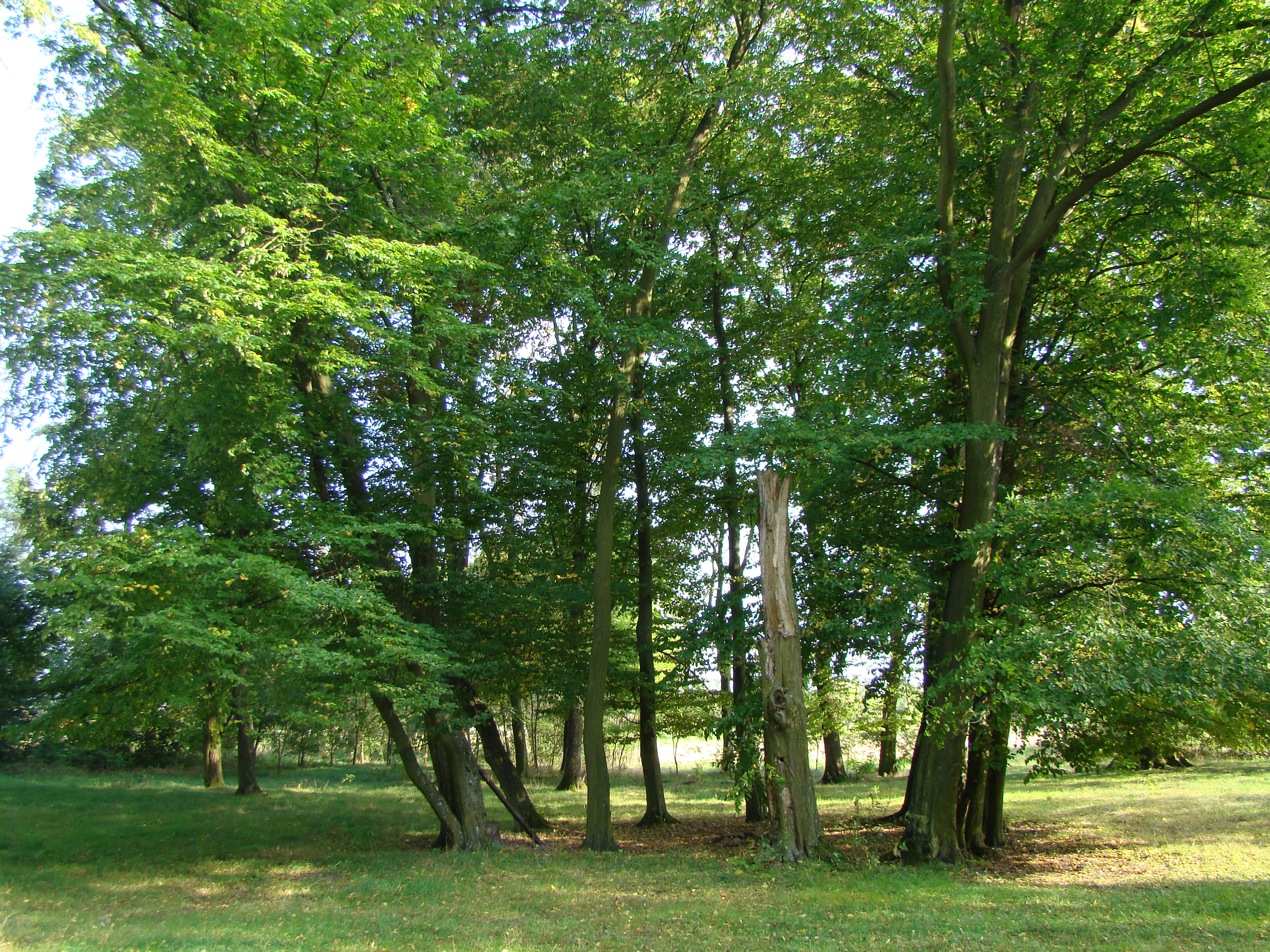
- Park

- Location within Poland
- Coordinates: 51°9′N 19°49′E
- Country: Poland
- Voivodeship: Łódź
- County: Piotrków
- Gmina: Łęki Szlacheckie

Dobrenice [dɔbrɛˈnit͡sɛ] is a village in the administrative district of Gmina Łęki Szlacheckie, within Piotrków County, Łódź Voivodeship, in central Poland.
