= Bartodzieje =

Bartodzieje may refer to the following places in Poland:

- Bartodzieje, Lower Silesian Voivodeship (south-west Poland)
- Bartodzieje, Łódź Voivodeship (central Poland)
- Bartodzieje, Grójec County in Masovian Voivodeship (east-central Poland)
- Bartodzieje, Pułtusk County in Masovian Voivodeship (east-central Poland)
- Bartodzieje, Zwoleń County in Masovian Voivodeship (east-central Poland)
- Bartodzieje, Radom County in Masovian Voivodeship (east-central Poland)
- Bartodzieje, Greater Poland Voivodeship (west-central Poland)
