= Kolonia Trzepnica =

- Village
- Location within Poland
- Coordinates: 51°12′4″N 19°41′26″E
- Country: Poland
- Voivodeship: Łódź
- County: Piotrków
- Gmina: Łęki Szlacheckie

Kolonia Trzepnica [kɔˈlɔɲa tʂɛpˈnit͡sa] is a village in the administrative district of Gmina Łęki Szlacheckie, within Piotrków County, Łódź Voivodeship, in central Poland.
