= Krery =

Krery may refer to the following places:

- Krery, Łódź Voivodeship (central Poland)
- Krery, Masovian Voivodeship (east-central Poland)
- Krery, Pomeranian Voivodeship (north Poland)
