= Paskrzyn =

- Village
- Location within Poland
- Coordinates: 51°14′N 19°53′E
- Country: Poland
- Voivodeship: Łódź
- County: Piotrków
- Gmina: Ręczno

Paskrzyn [ˈpaskʂɨn] is a village in the administrative district of Gmina Ręczno, within Piotrków County, Łódź Voivodeship, in central Poland.
