= Olszyny, Łódź Voivodeship =

Olszyny
- Village
- Location within Poland
- Coordinates: 51°14′N 19°47′E
- Country: Poland
- Voivodeship: Łódź
- County: Piotrków
- Gmina: Łęki Szlacheckie

Olszyny [ɔlˈʂɨnɨ] is a village in the administrative district of Gmina Łęki Szlacheckie, within Piotrków County, Łódź Voivodeship, in central Poland.
