= Rzepki =

Rzepki may refer to the following places:

- Rzepki, Łódź Voivodeship (central Poland)
- Rzepki, Masovian Voivodeship (east-central Poland)
- Rzepki, Warmian-Masurian Voivodeship (north Poland)
