= Będzyn =

- Village
- Location within Poland
- Coordinates: 51°10′N 19°54′E
- Country: Poland
- Voivodeship: Łódź
- County: Piotrków
- Gmina: Ręczno

Będzyn [ˈbɛnd͡zɨn] is a village in the administrative district of Gmina Ręczno, within Piotrków County, Łódź Voivodeship, in central Poland.
