= Stobnica Castle =

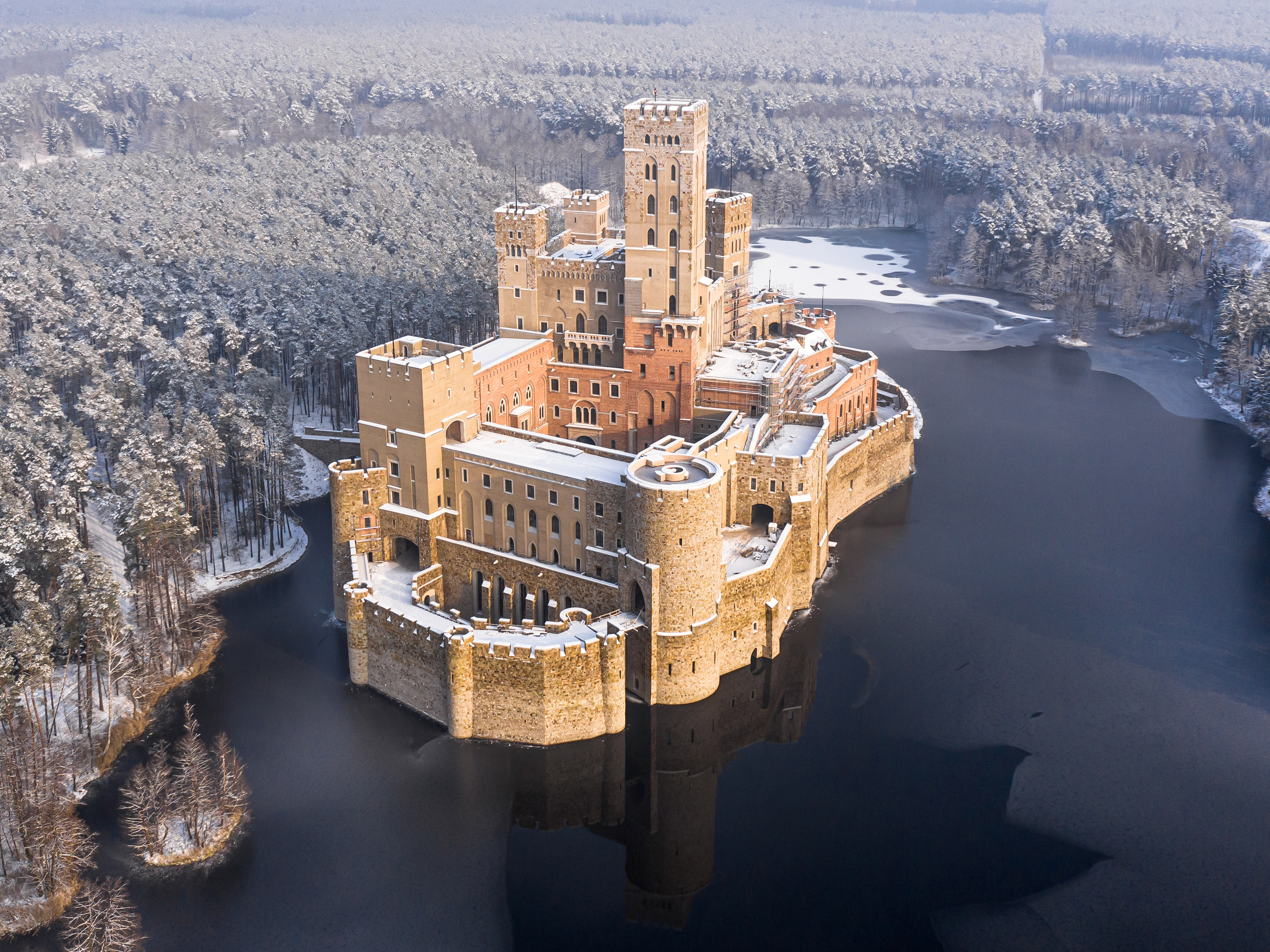
- Stobnica Castle

- Location within Greater Poland Voivodeship Location within Poland

General information
- Status: Under construction
- Type: residential
- Architectural style: Revivalism
- Location: Stobnica, Poland
- Coordinates: 52°42′44″N 16°36′47″E
- Construction started: 2015

Design and construction
- Architect: Waldemar Szeszuła

Stobnica Castle is a building under construction in Stobnica, Poland. The building is a contemporary example of Revivalism, imitating a large medieval castle. As of 2024, the building is still under construction, but since 2023, an educational path has been available for visitors.

== Controversies ==
In 2018, the construction was made public and caused a lot of controversy due to its location on the edge of the Noteć Forest and the Natura 2000 area.
