= Nowinki =

Nowinki may refer to the following places:

- Nowinki, Łódź Voivodeship (central Poland)
- Nowinki, Łuków County in Lublin Voivodeship (east Poland)
- Nowinki, Gmina Tyszowce, Tomaszów County in Lublin Voivodeship (east Poland)
- Nowinki, Piaseczno County in Masovian Voivodeship (east-central Poland)
- Nowinki, Wołomin County in Masovian Voivodeship (east-central Poland)
- Nowinki, Greater Poland Voivodeship (west-central Poland)
- Nowinki, Kartuzy County in Pomeranian Voivodeship (north Poland)
- Nowinki, Gmina Nowy Dwór Gdański in Pomeranian Voivodeship (north Poland)
