= Zamość, Piotrków County =

Zamość
- Village
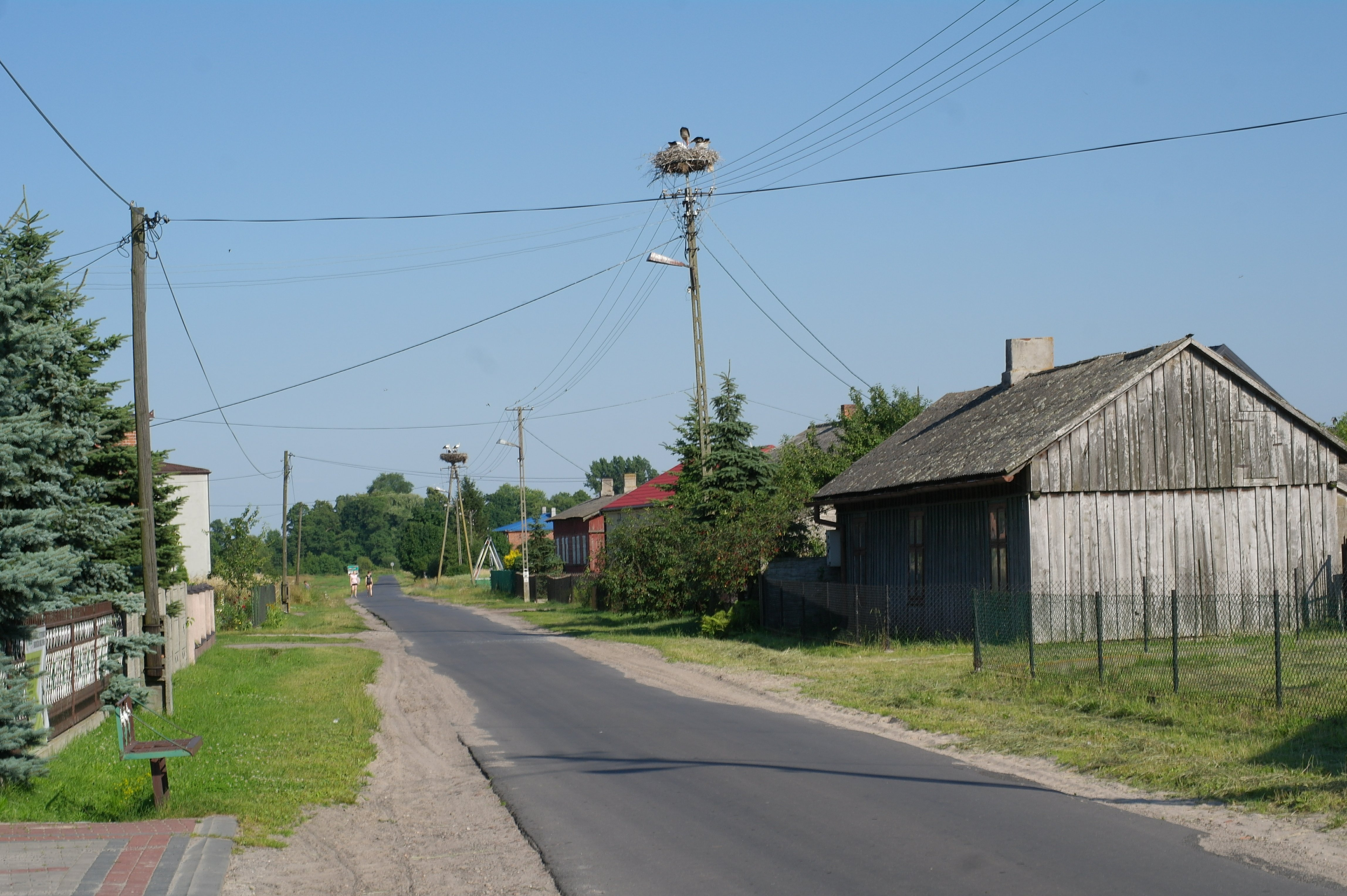

- Location within Poland
- Coordinates: 51°36′36″N 19°42′26″E
- Country: Poland
- Voivodeship: Łódź
- County: Piotrków
- Gmina: Czarnocin

Zamość (Polish pronunciation: [ˈzamɔɕt͡ɕ]) is a village in the administrative district of Gmina Czarnocin, within Piotrków County, Łódź Voivodeship, in central Poland.
