= Łęg Ręczyński =

- Village
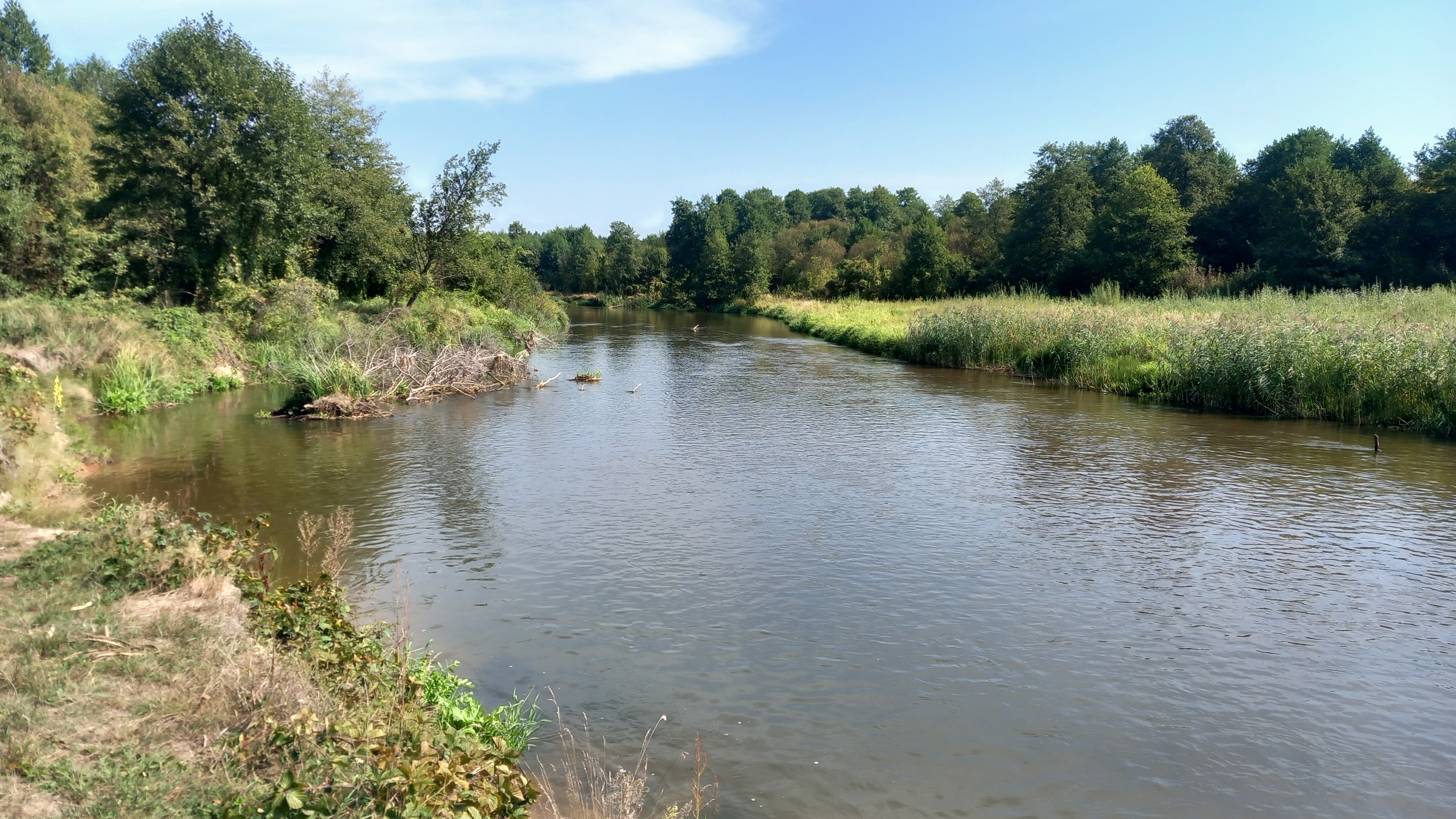

- Location within Poland
- Coordinates: 51°12′N 19°55′E
- Country: Poland
- Voivodeship: Łódź
- County: Piotrków
- Gmina: Ręczno
- Population: 180

Łęg Ręczyński [ˈwɛnk rɛnˈt͡ʂɨɲski] is a village in the administrative district of Gmina Ręczno, within Piotrków County, Łódź Voivodeship, in central Poland.
