= Dorszyn =

- Village
- Location within Poland
- Coordinates: 51°14′N 19°50′E
- Country: Poland
- Voivodeship: Łódź
- County: Piotrków
- Gmina: Łęki Szlacheckie

Dorszyn [ˈdɔrʂɨn] is a village in the administrative district of Gmina Łęki Szlacheckie, within Piotrków County, Łódź Voivodeship, in central Poland.

== Etymology ==
Considered to be derived from personal name Dorsza.
