= Niwy, Piotrków County =

Niwy
- Village
- Location within Poland
- Coordinates: 51°12′34″N 19°40′56″E
- Country: Poland
- Voivodeship: Łódź
- County: Piotrków
- Gmina: Łęki Szlacheckie

Niwy [ˈnivɨ] is a village in the administrative district of Gmina Łęki Szlacheckie, within Piotrków County, Łódź Voivodeship, in central Poland.
