= Trzepnica =

- Village
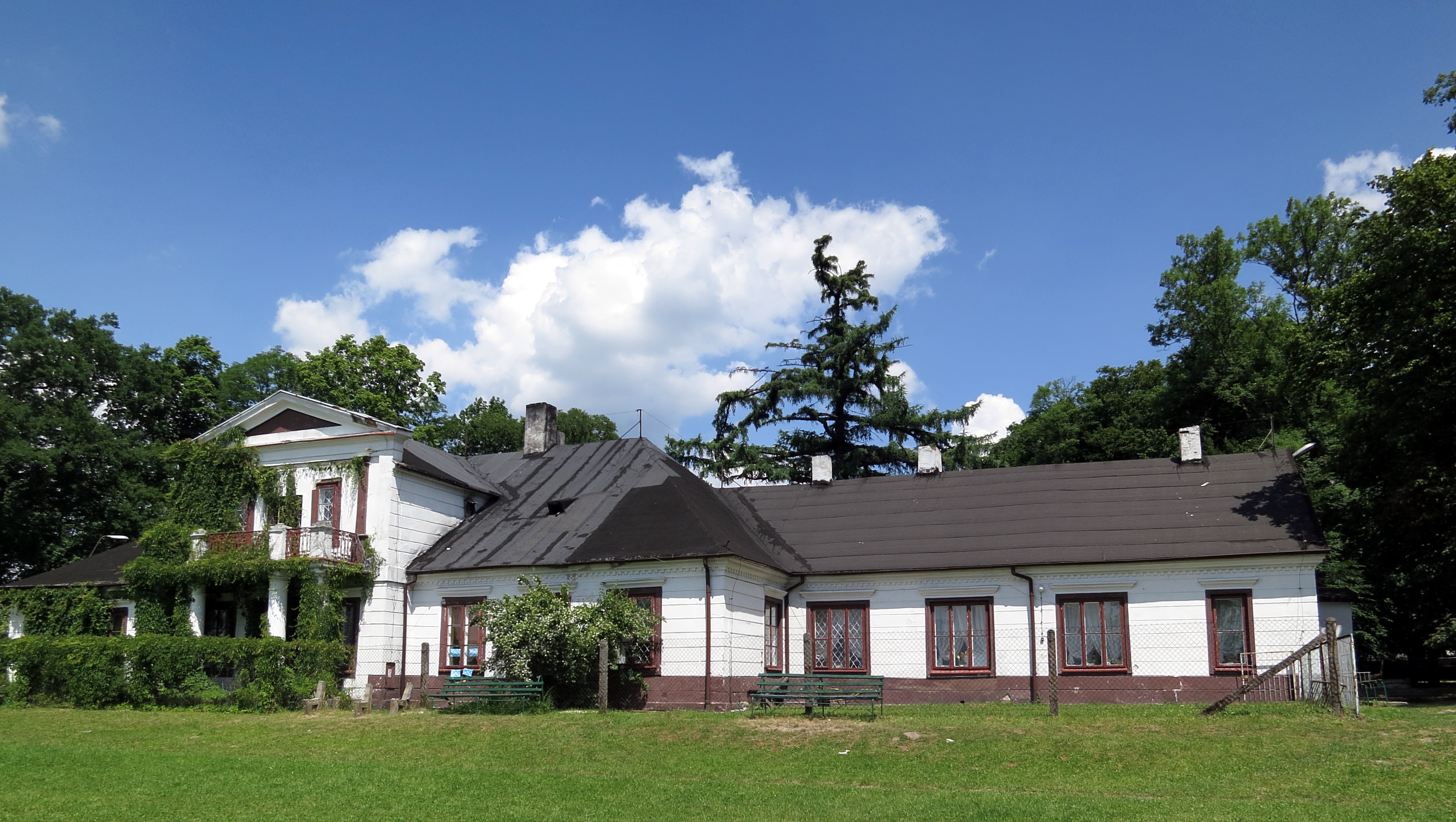
- Manor

- Location within Poland
- Coordinates: 51°13′N 19°44′E
- Country: Poland
- Voivodeship: Łódź
- County: Piotrków
- Gmina: Łęki Szlacheckie

Trzepnica [tʂɛpˈnit͡sa] is a village in the administrative district of Gmina Łęki Szlacheckie, within Piotrków County, Łódź Voivodeship, in central Poland.
