= Gmina Czarnocin =

Gmina Czarnocin may refer to either of the following rural administrative districts in Poland:

- Gmina Czarnocin, Świętokrzyskie Voivodeship
- Gmina Czarnocin, Łódź Voivodeship
