= Janów, Gmina Łęki Szlacheckie =

Janów
- Village
- Location within Poland
- Coordinates: 51°9′39″N 19°44′53″E
- Country: Poland
- Voivodeship: Łódź
- County: Piotrków
- Gmina: Łęki Szlacheckie

Janów [ˈjanuf] is a village in the administrative district of Gmina Łęki Szlacheckie, within Piotrków County, Łódź Voivodeship, in central Poland.
