= Felicja, Łódź Voivodeship =

Village in Gmina Łęki Szlacheckie, Poland

Felicja
- Village
- Location within Poland
- Coordinates: 51°11′58″N 19°48′38″E
- Country: Poland
- Voivodeship: Łódź
- County: Piotrków
- Gmina: Łęki Szlacheckie

Felicja [fɛˈlit͡sja] is a village in the administrative district of Gmina Łęki Szlacheckie, within Piotrków County, Łódź Voivodeship, in central Poland.
