= Huta, Piotrków County =

Huta
- Village
- Location within Poland
- Coordinates: 51°10′35″N 19°46′29″E
- Country: Poland
- Voivodeship: Łódź
- County: Piotrków
- Gmina: Łęki Szlacheckie

Huta [ˈxuta] is a village in the administrative district of Gmina Łęki Szlacheckie, within Piotrków County, Łódź Voivodeship, in central Poland.
