= Tomawa =

- Village
- Location within Poland
- Coordinates: 51°15′N 19°47′E
- Country: Poland
- Voivodeship: Łódź
- County: Piotrków
- Gmina: Łęki Szlacheckie

Tomawa [tɔˈmava] is a village in the administrative district of Gmina Łęki Szlacheckie, within Piotrków County, Łódź Voivodeship, in central Poland.
