= Kolonia Żerechowa =

- Settlement
- Location within Poland
- Coordinates: 51°14′2″N 19°44′10″E
- Country: Poland
- Voivodeship: Łódź
- County: Piotrków
- Gmina: Łęki Szlacheckie

Kolonia Żerechowa [kɔˈlɔɲa ʐɛrɛˈxɔva] is a settlement in the administrative district of Gmina Łęki Szlacheckie, within Piotrków County, Łódź Voivodeship, in central Poland.
