= Zawodzie, Piotrków County =

Zawodzie
- Village
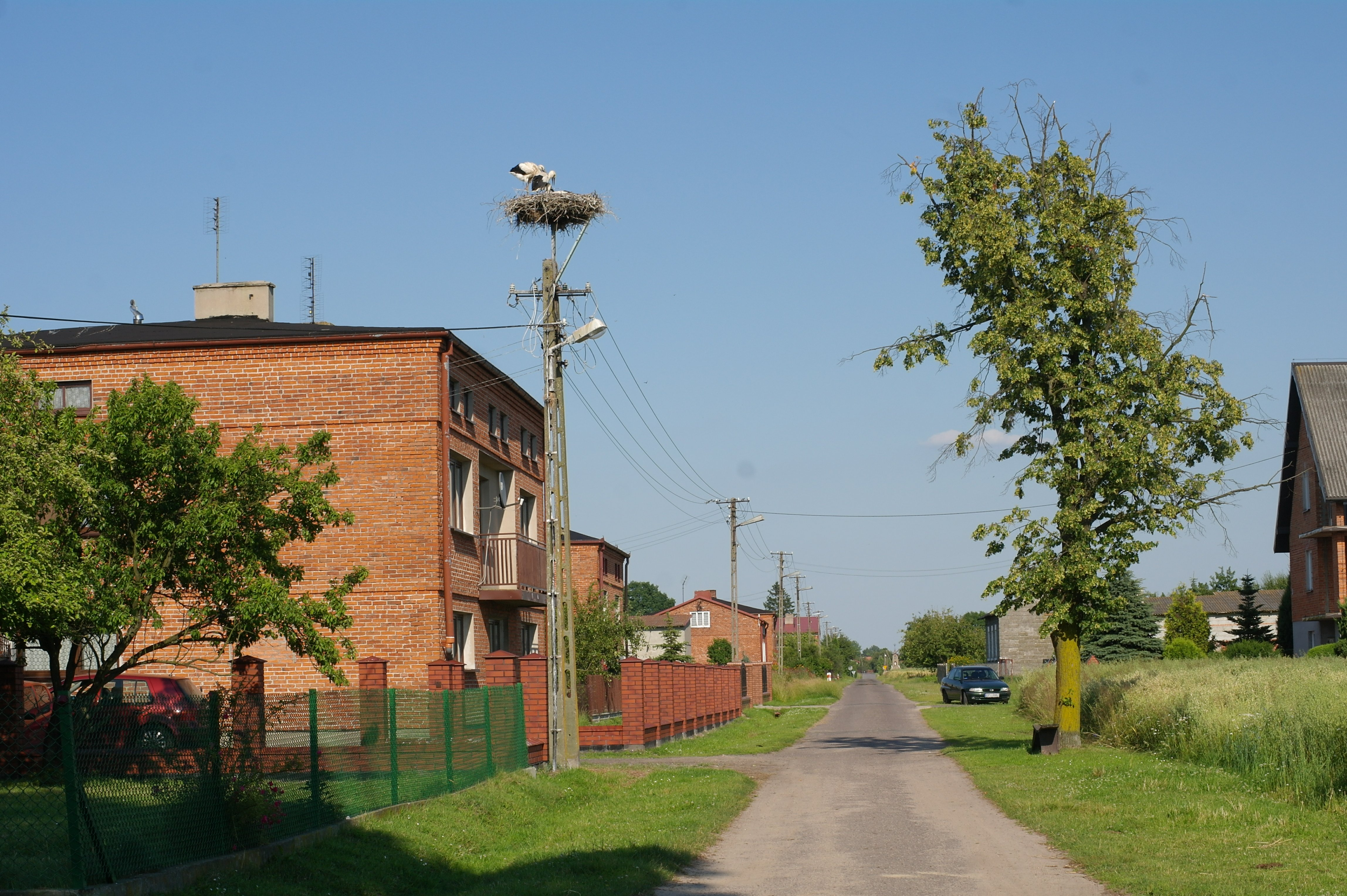

- Location within Poland
- Coordinates: 51°37′N 19°41′E
- Country: Poland
- Voivodeship: Łódź
- County: Piotrków
- Gmina: Czarnocin

Zawodzie [zaˈvɔd͡ʑɛ] is a village in the administrative district of Gmina Czarnocin, within Piotrków County, Łódź Voivodeship, in central Poland.
