= Halina Molka =

Polish politician (born 1953)

member of Sejm 2005-2007
- In office 25 September 2005 – 2007

Personal details
- Born: 1953 (age 72–73)
- Party: Samoobrona

Halina Molka (born 4 April 1953 in Kalinki) is a Polish politician. She was elected to the Sejm on 25 September 2005, getting 3706 votes in 10 Piotrków Trybunalski district as a candidate from the Samoobrona Rzeczpospolitej Polskiej list.

== See also ==
- Members of Polish Sejm 2005-2007
