= Strzelce Małe =

Strzelce Małe may refer to the following places:

- Strzelce Małe, Greater Poland Voivodeship (west-central Poland)
- Strzelce Małe, Lesser Poland Voivodeship (south Poland)
- Strzelce Małe, Łódź Voivodeship (central Poland)
