= Gmina Masłowice =

Gmina Masłowice Masłowice Commune
- Gmina
- Interactive map of Gmina Masłowice
- Coordinates (Masłowice): 51°6′25″N 19°47′6″E
- Country: Poland
- Voivodeship: Łódź
- County: Radomsko
- Seat: Masłowice

Area
  - Total: 116.2 km^{2} (44.9 sq mi)

Population (2006)
  - Total: 4,369
  - Density: 37.60/km^{2} (97.38/sq mi)

Gmina Masłowice is a rural gmina (administrative district) in Radomsko County, Łódź Voivodeship, in central Poland. Its seat is the village of Masłowice, which lies approximately 24 kilometres (15 mi) east of Radomsko and 79 km (49 mi) south of the regional capital Łódź.

The gmina covers an area of 116.2 square kilometres (44.9 sq mi), and as of 2006 its total population is 4,369.

== Villages ==
Gmina Masłowice contains the villages and settlements of Bartodzieje, Borki, Chełmo, Granice, Huta Przerębska, Jaskółki, Kalinki, Kawęczyn, Koconia, Kolonia Przerąb, Korytno, Kraszewice, Krery, Łączkowice, Masłowice, Ochotnik, Przerąb, Strzelce Małe, Tworowice and Wola Przerębska.

== Neighbouring gminas ==
Gmina Masłowice is bordered by the gminas of Gorzkowice, Kobiele Wielkie, Kodrąb, Łęki Szlacheckie, Przedbórz, Ręczno and Wielgomłyny.
