= Gmina Łęki Szlacheckie =

Gmina Łęki Szlacheckie Łęki Szlacheckie Commune
- Gmina
- Interactive map of Gmina Łęki Szlacheckie
- Coordinates (Łęki Szlacheckie): 51°11′5″N 19°48′33″E
- Country: Poland
- Voivodeship: Łódź
- County: Piotrków County
- Seat: Łęki Szlacheckie

Area
  - Total: 108.41 km^{2} (41.86 sq mi)

Population (2006)
  - Total: 3,686
  - Density: 34.00/km^{2} (88.06/sq mi)

Gmina Łęki Szlacheckie is a rural gmina (administrative district) in Piotrków County, Łódź Voivodeship, in central Poland. Its seat is the village of Łęki Szlacheckie, which lies approximately 26 kilometres (16 mi) south of Piotrków Trybunalski and 71 km (44 mi) south of the regional capital Łódź.

The gmina covers an area of 108.41 square kilometres (41.9 sq mi), and as of 2006 its total population is 3,686.

== Villages ==
Gmina Łęki Szlacheckie contains the villages and settlements of Adamów, Antonielów, Bęczkowice, Cieśle, Dąbrowa, Dobrenice, Dobreniczki, Dorszyn, Felicja, Górale, Huta, Ignaców Szlachecki, Janów, Kolonia Tomawa, Kolonia Trzepnica, Kolonia Żerechowa, Kuźnica Żerechowska, Łęki Szlacheckie, Lesiopole, Niwy, Ogrodzona, Olszyny, Piwaki, Podstole, Reducz, Stanisławów, Teklin, Tomawa, Trzepnica, Wykno and Żerechowa.

== Neighbouring gminas ==
Gmina Łęki Szlacheckie is bordered by the gminas of Gorzkowice, Masłowice, Ręczno and Rozprza.
