= Łęki Szlacheckie =

- Village
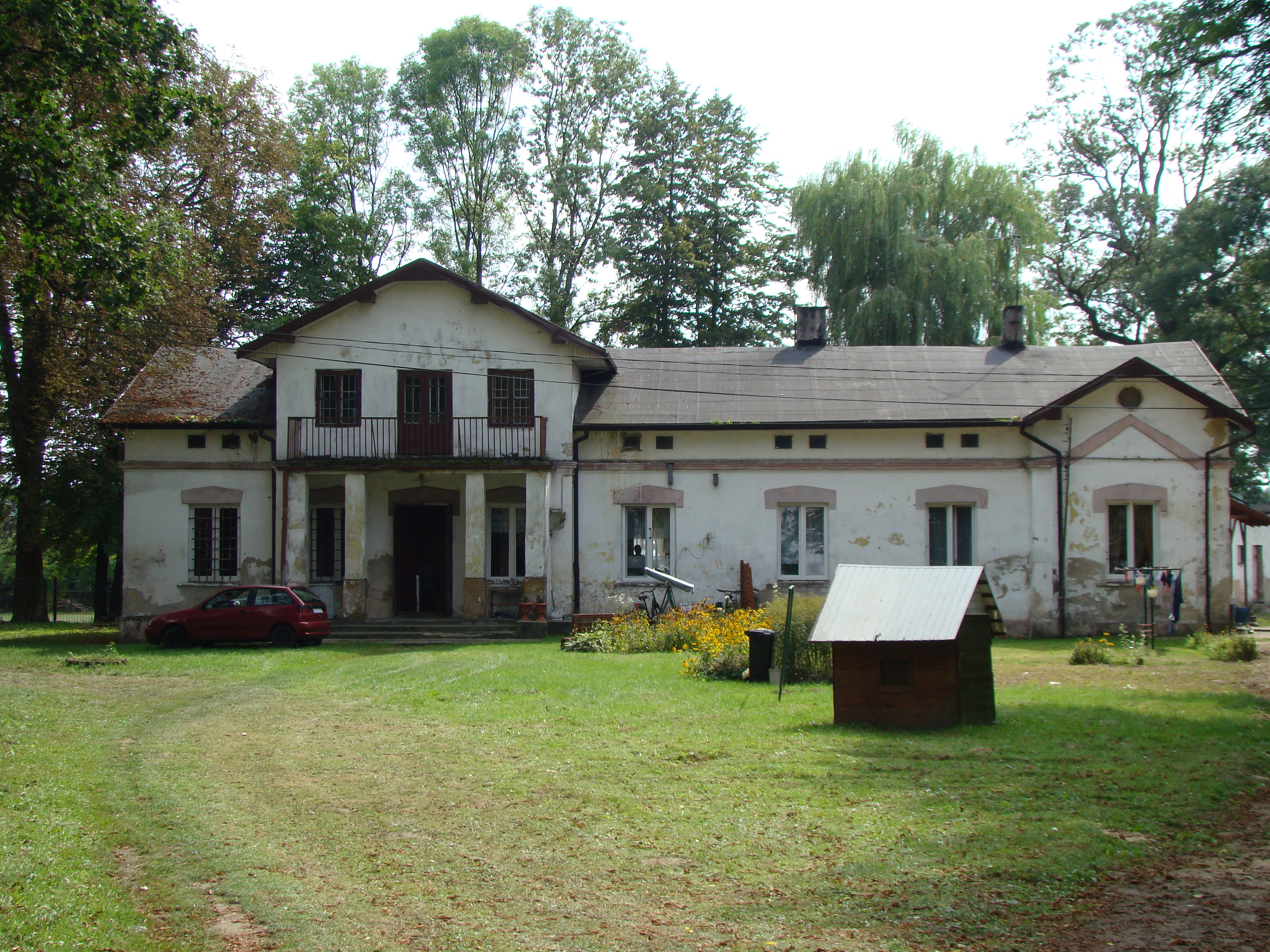

- Location within Poland
- Coordinates: 51°11′5″N 19°48′33″E
- Country: Poland
- Voivodeship: Łódź
- County: Piotrków
- Gmina: Łęki Szlacheckie
- Population: 450

Łęki Szlacheckie (Polish pronunciation: [ˈwɛŋkʲi ʂlaˈxɛtskʲɛ]) is a village in Piotrków County, Łódź Voivodeship, in central Poland. It is the seat of the gmina (administrative district) called Gmina Łęki Szlacheckie.
