= Ochotnik, Łódź Voivodeship =

Ochotnik
- Village
- Location within Poland
- Coordinates: 51°8′N 19°48′E
- Country: Poland
- Voivodeship: Łódź
- County: Radomsko
- Gmina: Masłowice

Ochotnik [ɔˈxɔtnik] is a village in the administrative district of Gmina Masłowice, within Radomsko County, Łódź Voivodeship, in central Poland.
