= Kraszewice, Łódź Voivodeship =

Kraszewice
- Village
- Location within Poland
- Coordinates: 51°4′5″N 19°47′5″E
- Country: Poland
- County: Radomsko
- Gmina: Masłowice
- Population: 427

Kraszewice [kraʂɛˈvit͡sɛ] is a village in the administrative district of Gmina Masłowice, within Radomsko County, Łódź Voivodeship, in central Poland.
