= Nowinki, Łódź Voivodeship =

Nowinki
- Village
- Location within Poland
- Coordinates: 51°12′N 19°54′E
- Country: Poland
- Voivodeship: Łódź
- County: Piotrków
- Gmina: Ręczno

Nowinki [nɔˈviŋki] is a village in the administrative district of Gmina Ręczno, within Piotrków County, Łódź Voivodeship, in central Poland.
