= Granice, Łódź Voivodeship =

Granice
- Village
- Location within Poland
- Coordinates: 51°5′35″N 19°43′39″E
- Country: Poland
- Voivodeship: Łódź
- County: Radomsko
- Gmina: Masłowice

Granice [ɡraˈnit͡sɛ] is a village in the administrative district of Gmina Masłowice, within Radomsko County, Łódź Voivodeship, in central Poland.
