= Chełmo =

- Village
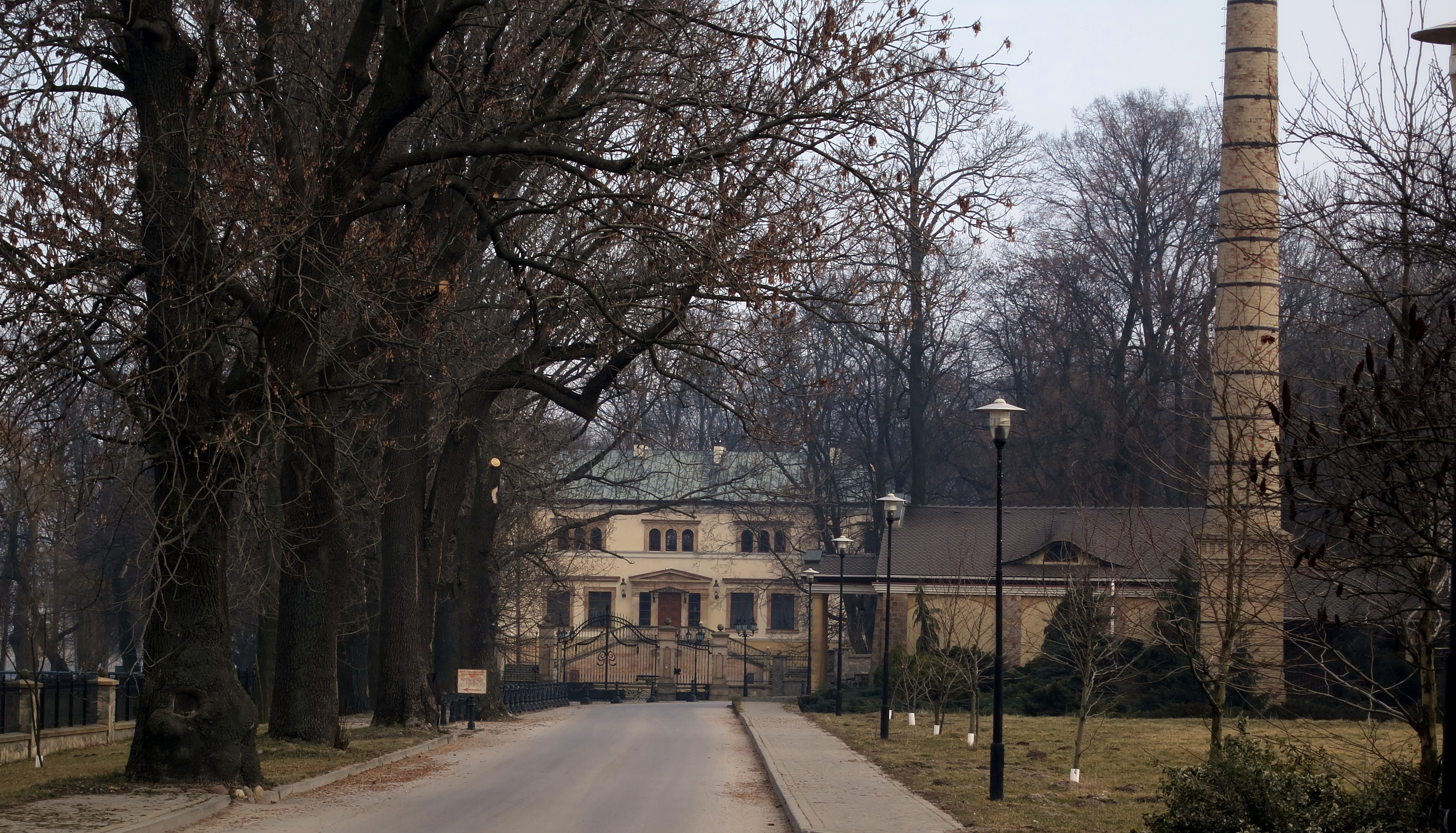

- Location within Poland
- Coordinates: 51°4′N 19°45′E
- Country: Poland
- Voivodeship: Łódź
- County: Radomsko
- Gmina: Masłowice
- Population (approx.): 1,000
- Website: iter.pl/nowak/

Chełmo [ˈxɛu̯mɔ] is a village in the administrative district of Gmina Masłowice, within Radomsko County, Łódź Voivodeship, in central Poland.

The village has an approximate population of 1,000.
