= Huta Przerębska =

- Village
- Location within Poland
- Coordinates: 51°07′37″N 19°42′17″E
- Country: Poland
- Voivodeship: Łódź
- County: Radomsko
- Gmina: Masłowice

Huta Przerębska [ˈxuta pʂɛˈrɛmpska] is a village in the administrative district of Gmina Masłowice, within Radomsko County, Łódź Voivodeship, in central Poland.
