= Dalków, Łódź Voivodeship =

Dalków
- Village
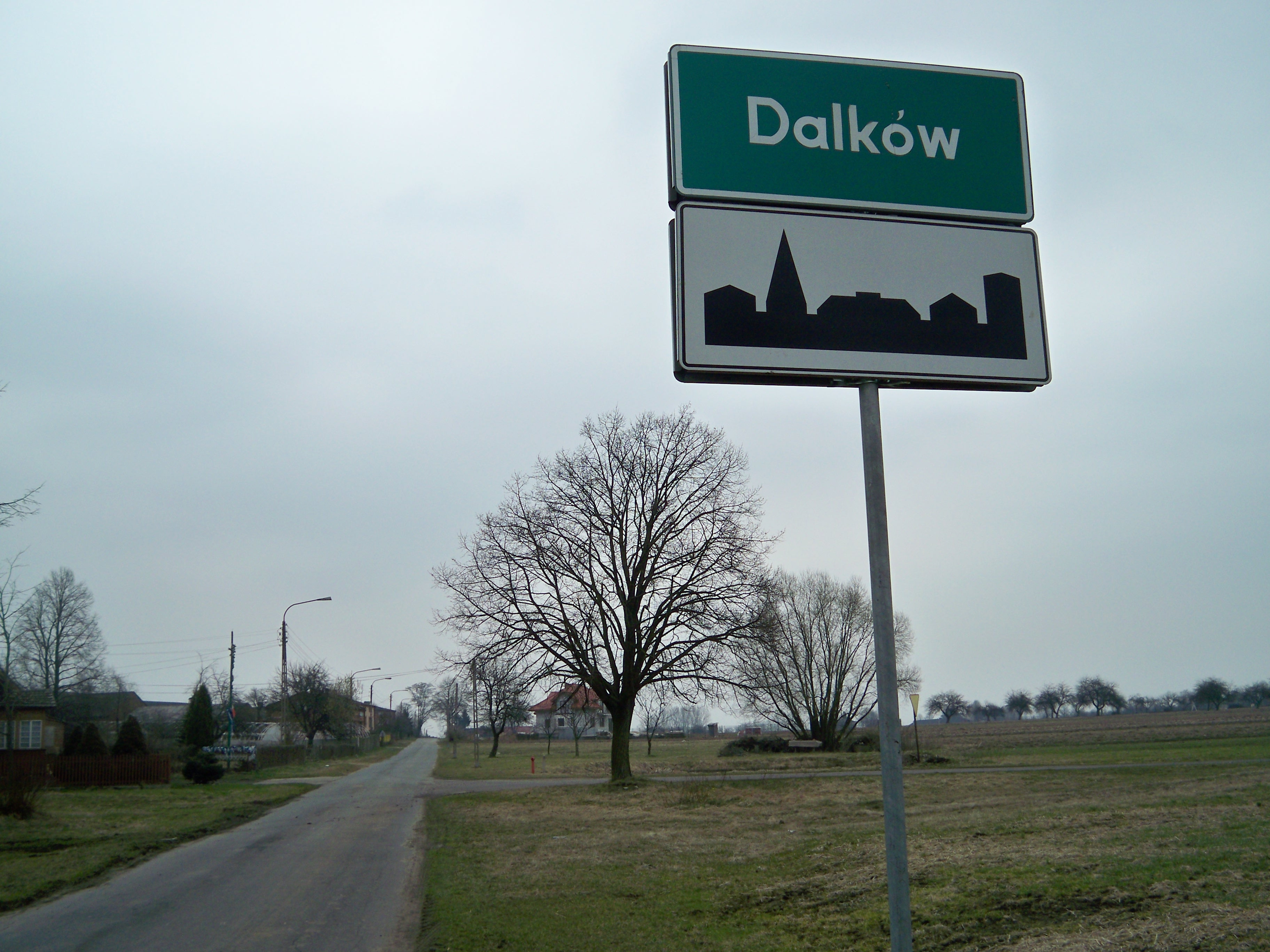

- Location within Poland
- Coordinates: 51°38′N 19°40′E
- Country: Poland
- Voivodeship: Łódź
- County: Piotrków
- Gmina: Czarnocin
- Population (approx.): 620

Dalków [ˈdalkuf] (1943–1945 German Dalken) is a village in the administrative district of Gmina Czarnocin, within Piotrków County, Łódź Voivodeship, in central Poland.

The village has an approximate population of 620.
