= Ręczno =

- Village
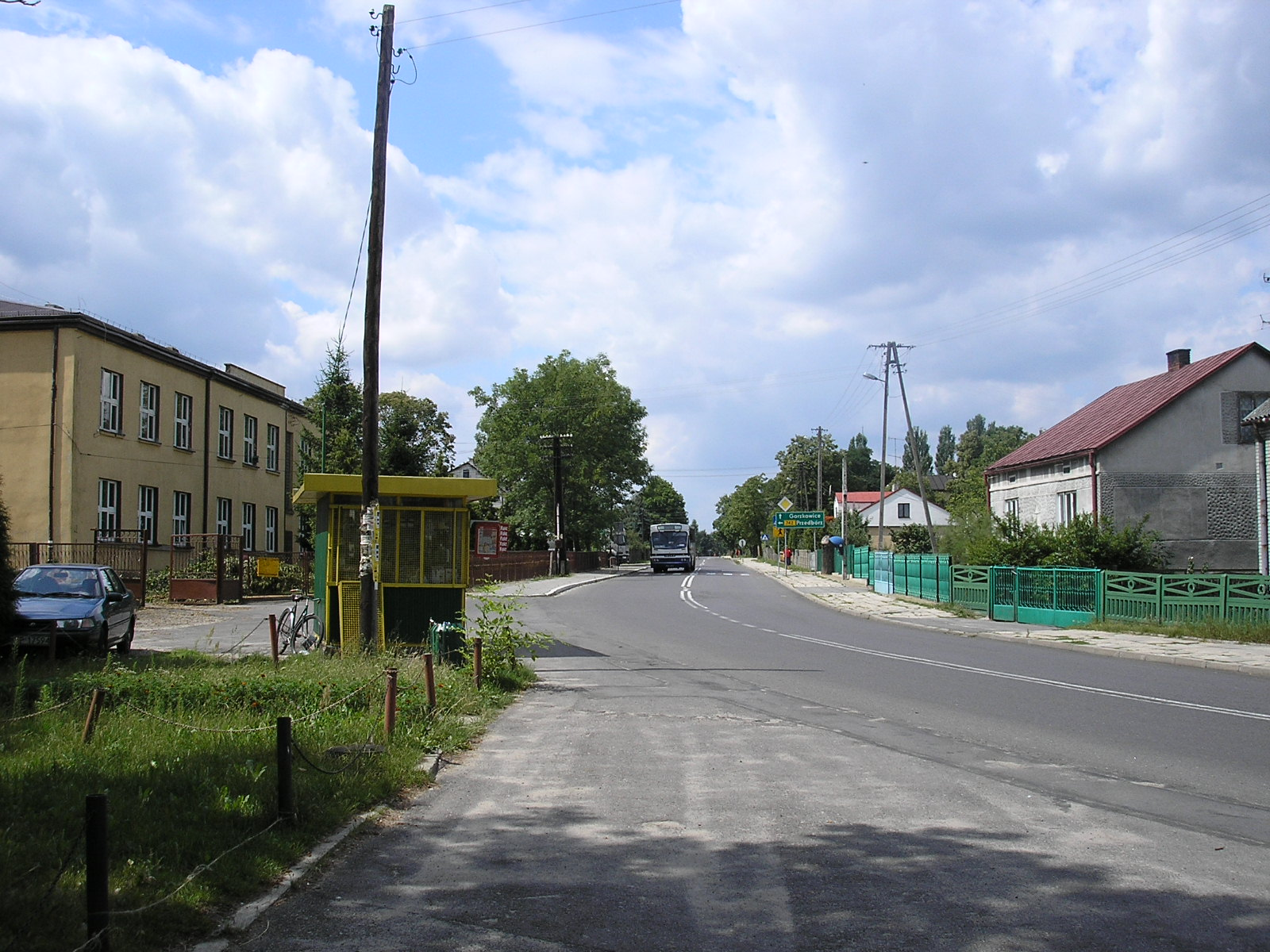

- Location within Poland
- Coordinates: 51°11′26″N 19°51′10″E
- Country: Poland
- Voivodeship: Łódź
- County: Piotrków
- Gmina: Ręczno
- Population: 690

Ręczno [ˈrɛnt͡ʂnɔ] is a village in Piotrków County, Łódź Voivodeship, in central Poland. It is the seat of the gmina (administrative district) called Gmina Ręczno.
