= Rzepki, Łódź Voivodeship =

Rzepki
- Village
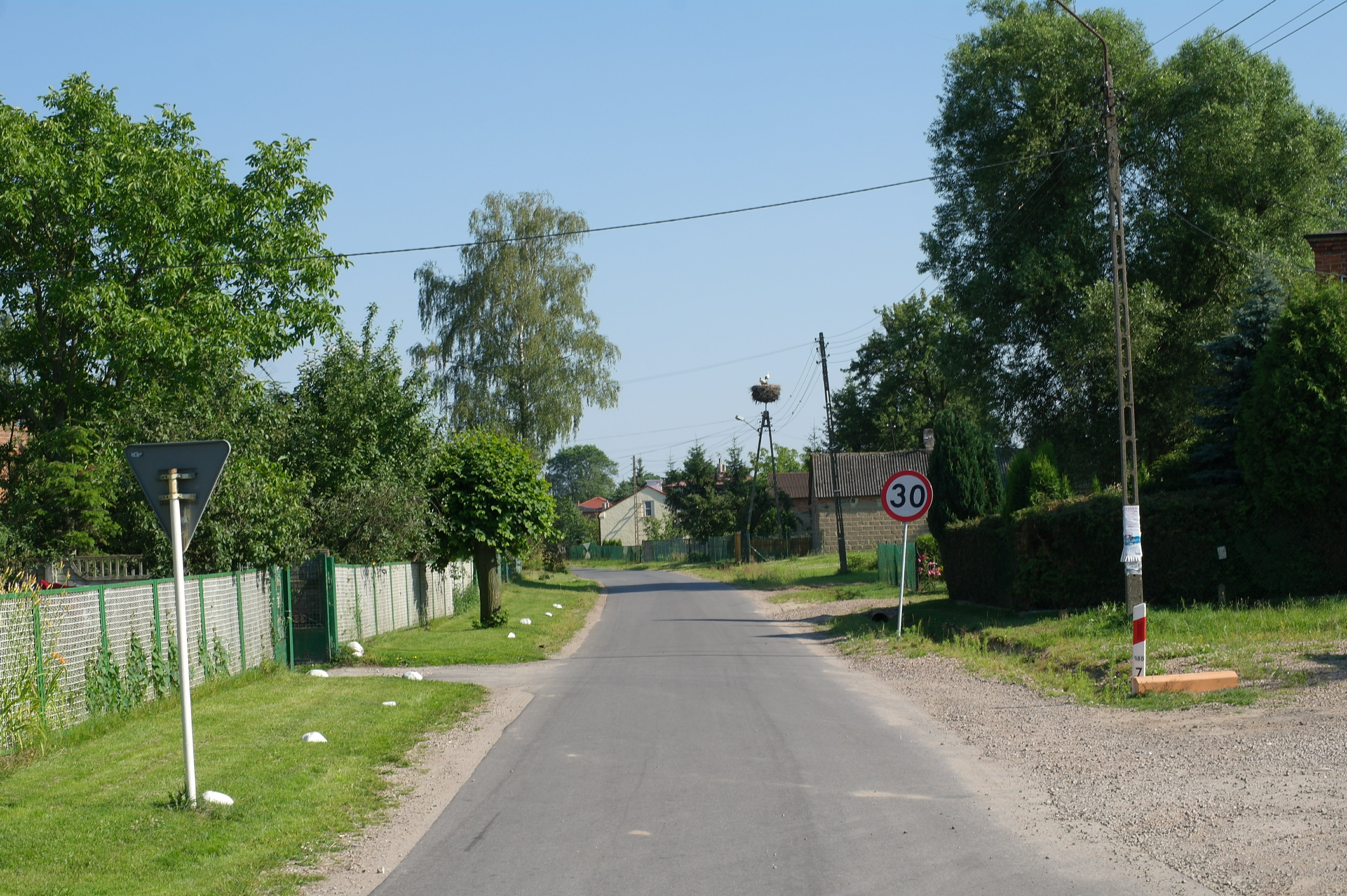

- Location within Poland
- Coordinates: 51°36′N 19°38′E
- Country: Poland
- Voivodeship: Łódź
- County: Piotrków
- Gmina: Czarnocin
- Population (approx.): 200

Rzepki [ˈʐɛpki] is a village in the administrative district of Gmina Czarnocin, within Piotrków County, Łódź Voivodeship, in central Poland.

The village has an approximate population of 200.
