= Przerąb =

- Village
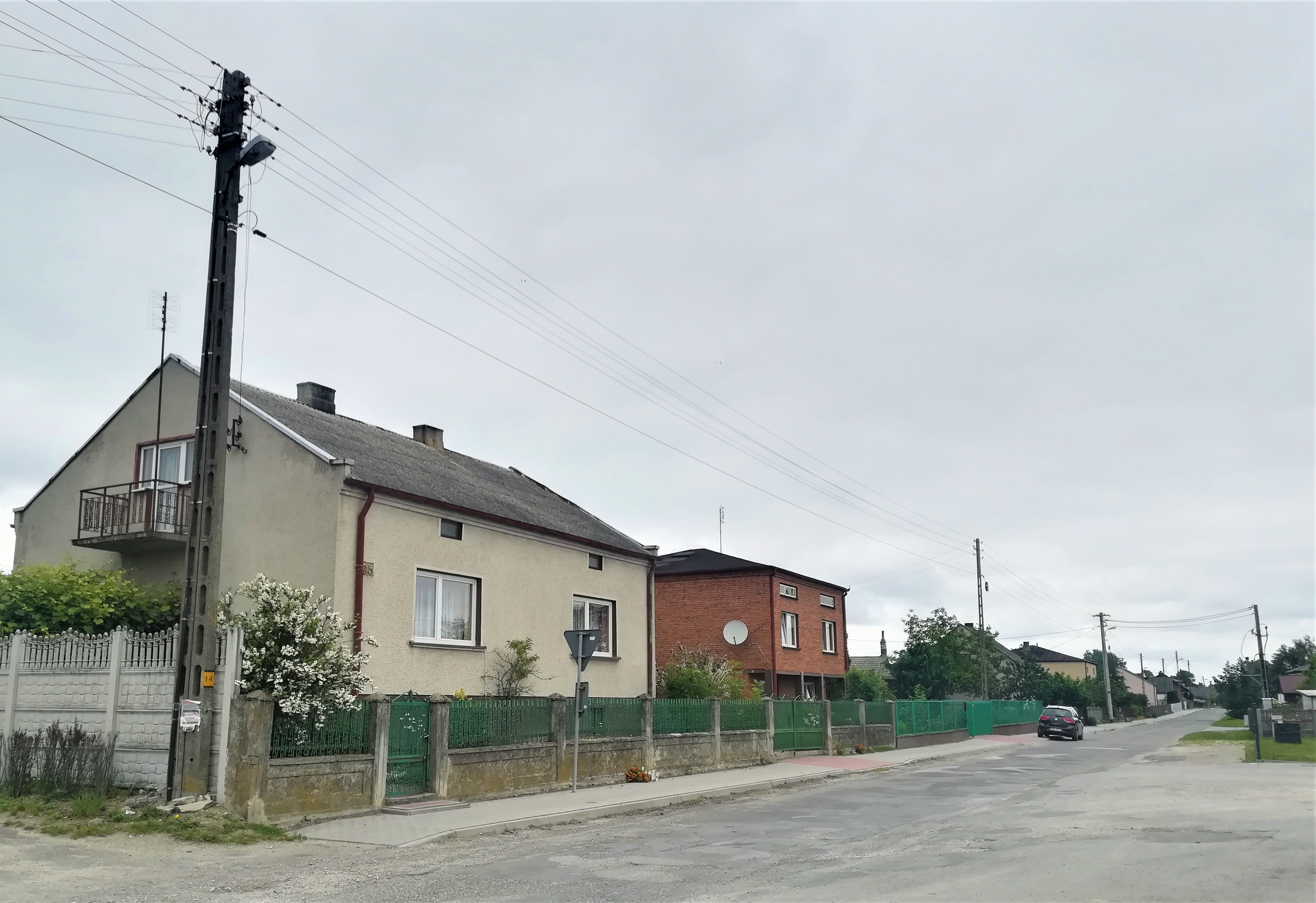

- Location within Poland
- Coordinates: 51°9′N 19°43′E
- Country: Poland
- Voivodeship: Łódź
- County: Radomsko
- Gmina: Masłowice
- Population (approx.): 170

Przerąb [ˈpʂɛrɔmp] is a village in the administrative district of Gmina Masłowice, within Radomsko County, Łódź Voivodeship, in central Poland.

The village has an approximate population of 170.
