= Kolonia Przerąb =

- Village
- Location within Poland
- Coordinates: 51°8′10″N 19°44′0″E
- Country: Poland
- Voivodeship: Łódź
- County: Radomsko
- Gmina: Masłowice

Kolonia Przerąb [kɔˈlɔɲa ˈpʂɛrɔmp] is a village in the administrative district of Gmina Masłowice, within Radomsko County, Łódź Voivodeship, in central Poland.
