= Borki, Gmina Masłowice =

Borki
- Village
- Location within Poland
- Coordinates: 51°7′54″N 19°41′52″E
- Country: Poland
- Voivodeship: Łódź
- County: Radomsko
- Gmina: Masłowice

Borki [ˈbɔrki] is a village in the administrative district of Gmina Masłowice, within Radomsko County, Łódź Voivodeship, in central Poland.
