= Masłowice, Radomsko County =

Masłowice
- Village
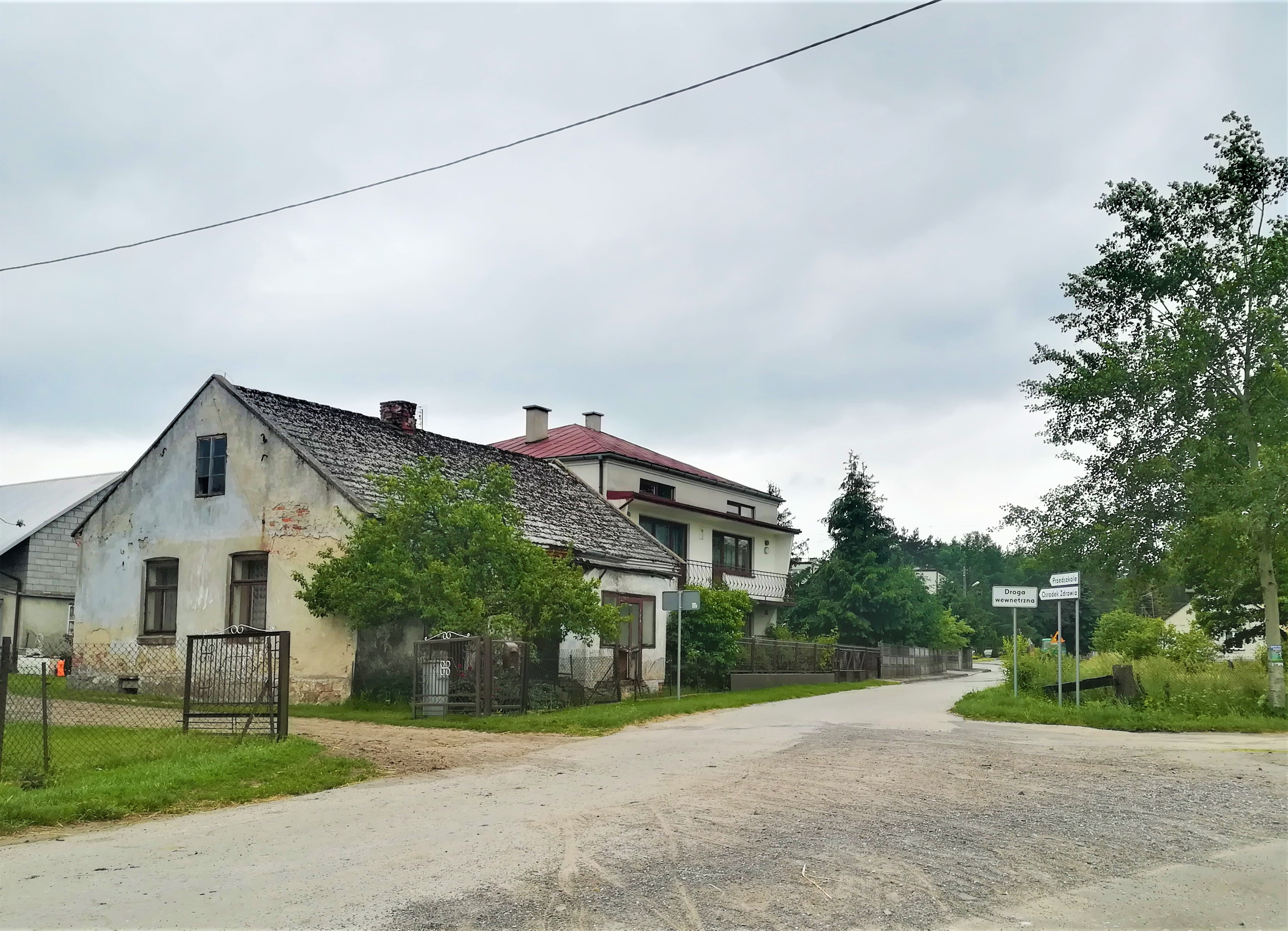

- Location within Poland
- Coordinates: 51°6′25″N 19°47′6″E
- Country: Poland
- Voivodeship: Łódź
- County: Radomsko
- Gmina: Masłowice

Masłowice [maswɔˈvit͡sɛ] is a village in Radomsko County, Łódź Voivodeship, in central Poland. It is the seat of the gmina (administrative district) called Gmina Masłowice.
