= Koconia =

- Village
- Location within Poland
- Coordinates: 51°3′29″N 19°47′34″E
- Country: Poland
- Voivodeship: Łódź
- County: Radomsko
- Gmina: Masłowice

Koconia [kɔˈt͡sɔɲa] is a village in the administrative district of Gmina Masłowice, within Radomsko County, Łódź Voivodeship, in central Poland.
