= Jaskółki, Radomsko County =

Jaskółki
- Village
- Location within Poland
- Coordinates: 51°5′30″N 19°49′17″E
- Country: Poland
- Voivodeship: Łódź
- County: Radomsko
- Gmina: Masłowice
- Population: 100

Jaskółki [jasˈkuu̯ki] is a village in the administrative district of Gmina Masłowice, within Radomsko County, Łódź Voivodeship, in central Poland.
