= Kawęczyn, Radomsko County =

Kawęczyn
- Village
- Location within Poland
- Coordinates: 51°3′52″N 19°50′44″E
- Country: Poland
- Voivodeship: Łódź
- County: Radomsko
- Gmina: Masłowice

Kawęczyn [kaˈvɛnt͡ʂɨn] is a village in the administrative district of Gmina Masłowice, within Radomsko County, Łódź Voivodeship, in central Poland.
