= Korytno =

- Village
- Location within Poland
- Coordinates: 51°6′N 19°50′E
- Country: Poland
- Voivodeship: Łódź
- County: Radomsko
- Gmina: Masłowice
- Population: 400

Korytno [kɔˈrɨtnɔ] is a village in the administrative district of Gmina Masłowice, within Radomsko County, Łódź Voivodeship, in central Poland.
