= Majkowice, Łódź Voivodeship =

Majkowice
- Village
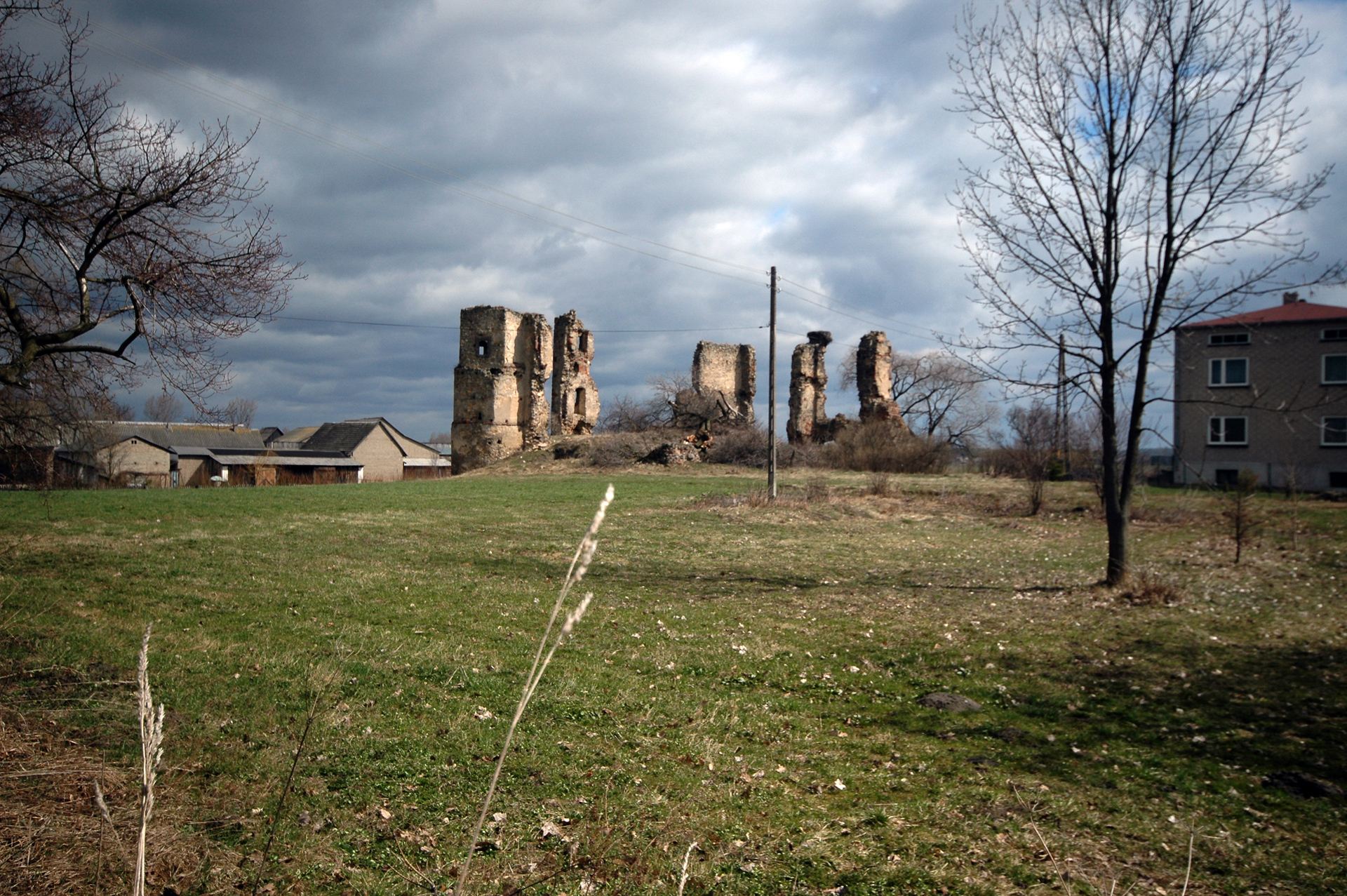
- Castle ruins

- Location within Poland
- Coordinates: 51°10′N 19°53′E
- Country: Poland
- Voivodeship: Łódź
- County: Piotrków
- Gmina: Ręczno

Majkowice [mai̯kɔˈvit͡sɛ] is a village in the administrative district of Gmina Ręczno, within Piotrków County, Łódź Voivodeship, in central Poland.
