= Stobnica, Łódź Voivodeship =

Stobnica
- Village
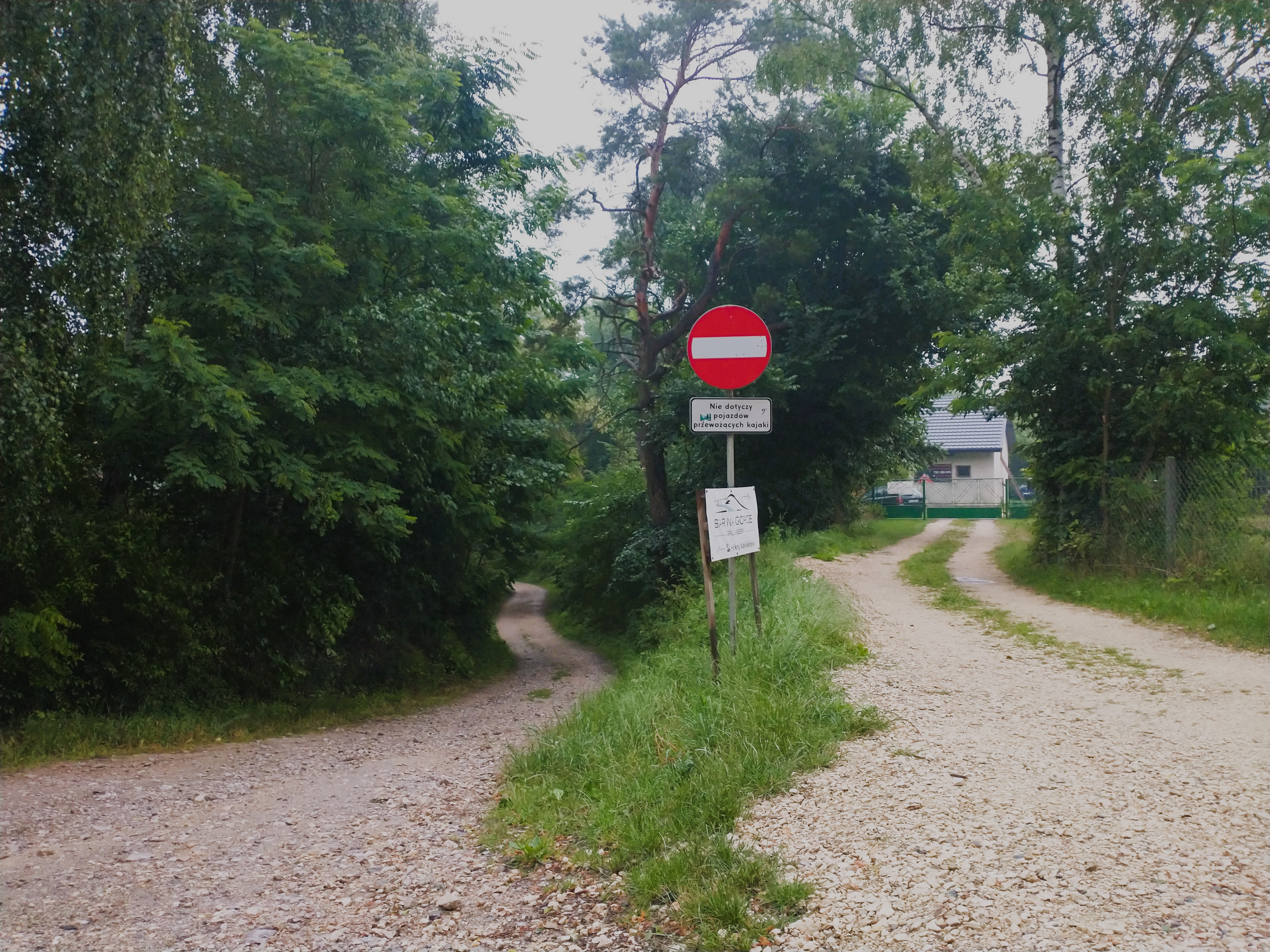

- Location within Poland
- Coordinates: 51°15′N 19°52′E
- Country: Poland
- Voivodeship: Łódź
- County: Piotrków
- Gmina: Ręczno

Stobnica [stɔbˈnit͡sa] is a village in the administrative district of Gmina Ręczno, within Piotrków County, Łódź Voivodeship, in central Poland.
