= Stobnica, Greater Poland Voivodeship =

Stobnica
- Village
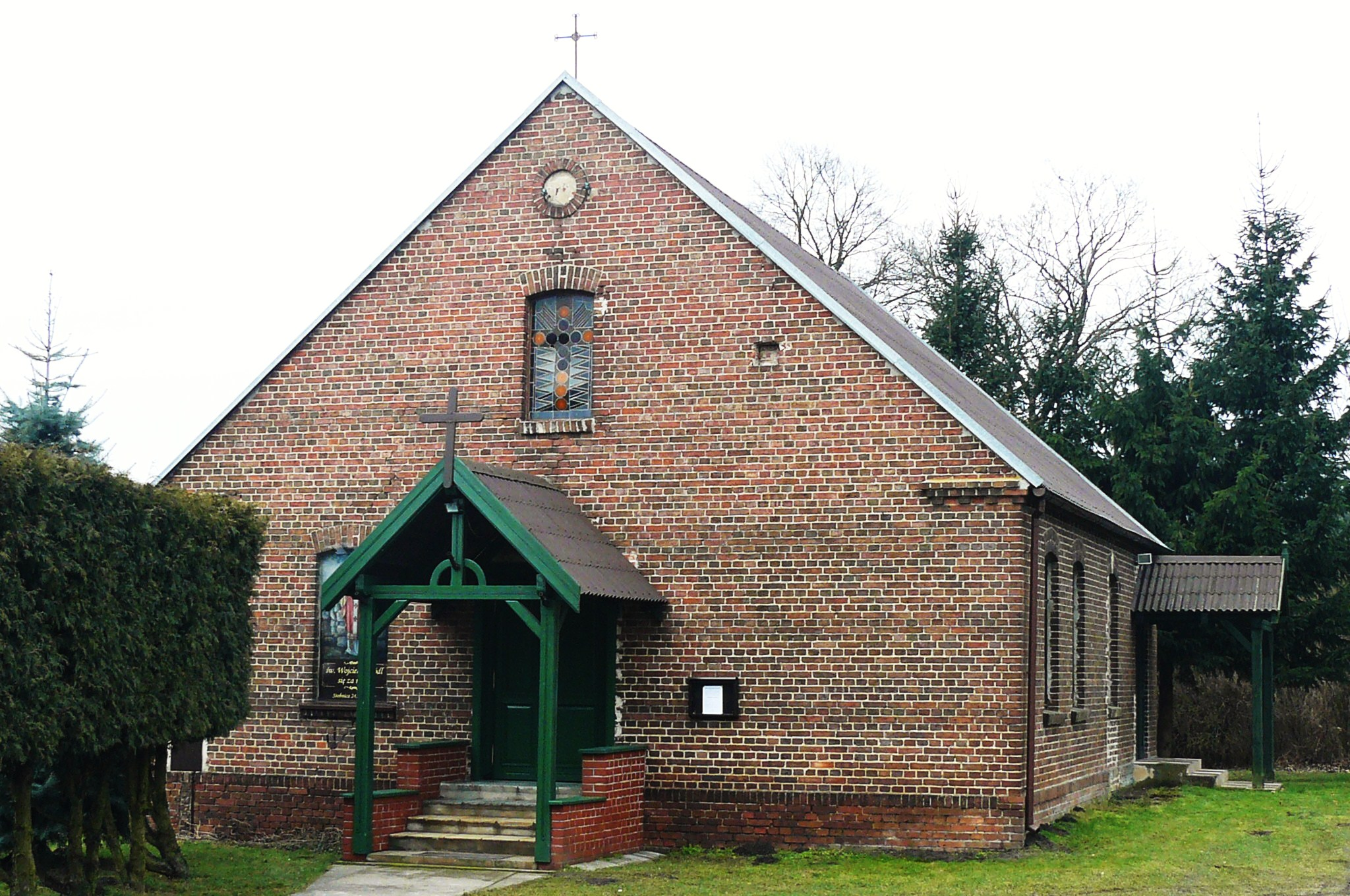
- Chapel of Saint Adalbert in Stobnica

- Location within Poland
- Coordinates: 52°43′N 16°37′E
- Country: Poland
- Voivodeship: Greater Poland
- County: Oborniki
- Gmina: Oborniki
- Population: 120

Stobnica ([stɔbˈnit͡sa]; German: Stonebau) is a village in the administrative district of Gmina Oborniki, within Oborniki County, Greater Poland Voivodeship, in west-central Poland. Stobnica Castle is located near the village.
