= Łączkowice, Radomsko County =

Łączkowice
- Village
- Location within Poland
- Coordinates: 51°4′22″N 19°51′28″E
- Country: Poland
- Voivodeship: Łódź
- County: Radomsko
- Gmina: Masłowice

Łączkowice [wɔnt͡ʂkɔˈvit͡sɛ] is a village in the administrative district of Gmina Masłowice, within Radomsko County, Łódź Voivodeship, in central Poland. In 1797, a settlement of Germans was formed in the village
