= Gmina Ręczno =

Gmina Ręczno Ręczno Commune
- Gmina
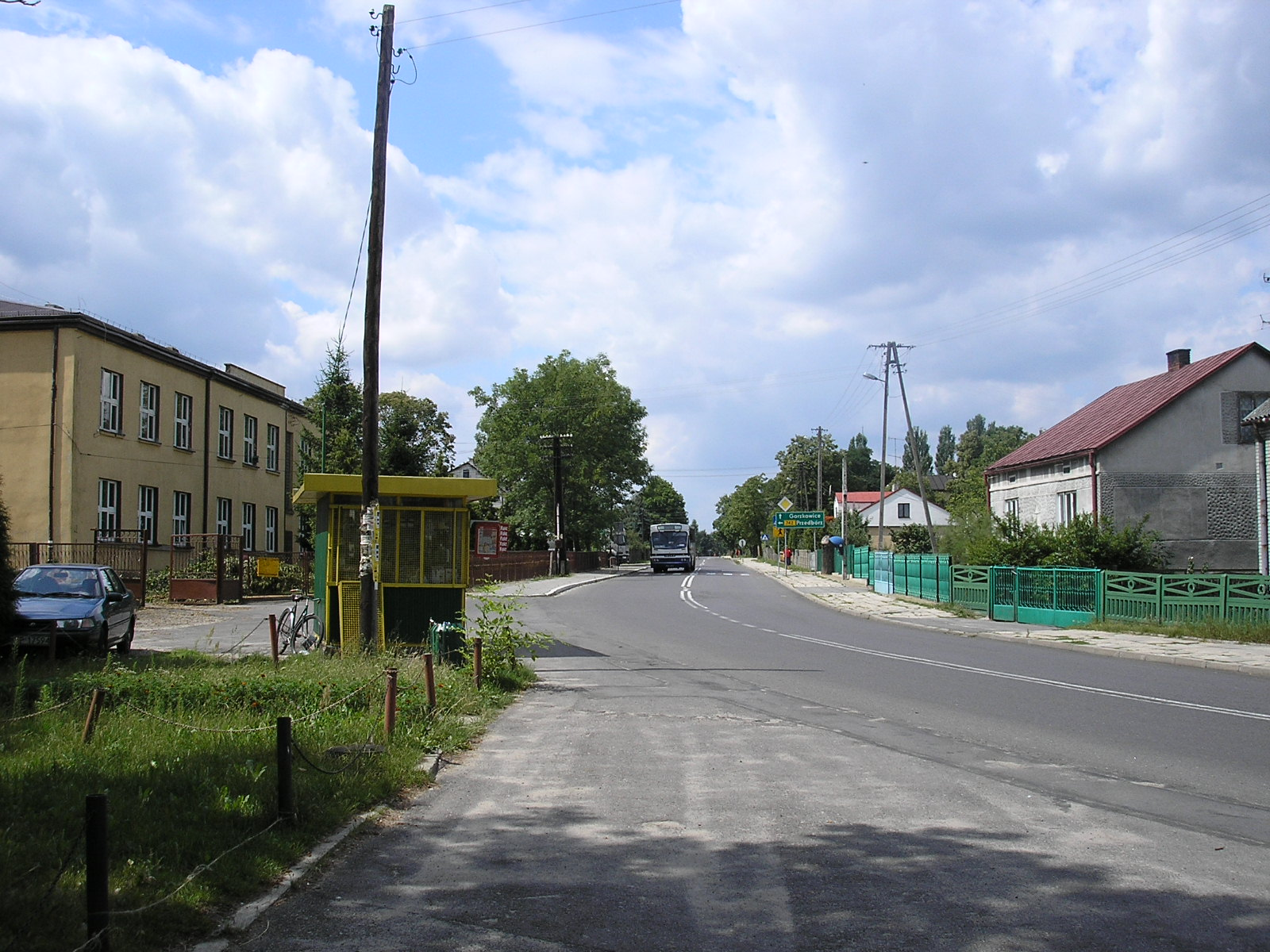
- Coordinates (Ręczno): 51°11′26″N 19°51′10″E
- Country: Poland
- Voivodeship: Łódź
- County: Piotrków County
- Seat: Ręczno

Area
  - Total: 89.21 km^{2} (34.44 sq mi)

Population (2006)
  - Total: 3,629
  - Density: 40.68/km^{2} (105.4/sq mi)
- Website: https://www.reczno.pl/

Gmina Ręczno is a rural gmina (administrative district) in Piotrków County, Łódź Voivodeship, in central Poland. Its seat is the village of Ręczno, which lies approximately 27 kilometres (17 mi) south-east of Piotrków Trybunalski and 72 km (45 mi) south of the regional capital Łódź.

The gmina covers an area of 89.21 square kilometres (34.4 sq mi), and as of 2006 its total population is 3,629.

The gmina contains part of the protected area called Sulejów Landscape Park.

== Villages ==
Gmina Ręczno contains the villages and settlements of Bąkowa Góra, Będzyn, Dęba, Kolonia Ręczno, Łęg Ręczyński, Łęki Królewskie, Majkowice, Nowinki, Paskrzyn, Ręczno, Stobnica, Stobnica-Piła, Wielkopole and Zbyłowice.

== Neighbouring gminas ==
Gmina Ręczno is bordered by the gminas of Aleksandrów, Łęki Szlacheckie, Masłowice, Przedbórz, Rozprza and Sulejów.
