= Gmina Czarnocin, Łódź Voivodeship =

Gmina Czarnocin Czarnocin Commune
- Gmina
- Interactive map of Gmina Czarnocin
- Coordinates: 51°35′40″N 19°40′15″E
- Country: Poland
- Voivodeship: Łódź
- County: Piotrków County
- Seat: Czarnocin

Area
  - Total: 72.74 km^{2} (28.09 sq mi)

Population (2006)
  - Total: 4,073
  - Density: 55.99/km^{2} (145.0/sq mi)
- Time zone: UTC+1 (CET)
  - Summer (DST): UTC+2 (CEST)
- Website: czarnocin.pl

Gmina Czarnocin is a rural gmina (administrative district) in Piotrków County, Łódź Voivodeship, in central Poland. Its seat is the village of Czarnocin, which lies approximately 19 kilometres (12 mi) north of Piotrków Trybunalski and 28 km (17 mi) south-east of the regional capital Łódź.

The gmina covers an area of 72.74 square kilometres (28.1 sq mi), and as of 2006 its total population is 4,073.

== Villages ==
Gmina Czarnocin contains the villages and settlements of:

- Bieżywody
- Biskupia Wola
- Budy Szynczyckie
- Czarnocin
- Dalków
- Grabina Wola
- Kalska Wola
- Rzepki
- Szynczyce
- Tychów
- Wola Kutowa
- Zamość
- Zawodzie

== Neighbouring gminas ==
Gmina Czarnocin is bordered by the gminas of Będków, Brójce, Moszczenica and Tuszyn.
