= Krery, Łódź Voivodeship =

Krery
- Village
- Location within Poland
- Coordinates: 51°7′10″N 19°45′26″E
- Country: Poland
- Voivodeship: Łódź
- County: Radomsko
- Gmina: Masłowice

Krery [ˈkrɛrɨ] is a village in the administrative district of Gmina Masłowice, within Radomsko County, Łódź Voivodeship, in central Poland.
