= Bartodzieje, Łódź Voivodeship =

Bartodzieje
- Village
- Location within Poland
- Coordinates: 51°10′4″N 19°43′26″E
- Country: Poland
- Voivodeship: Łódź
- County: Radomsko
- Gmina: Masłowice

Bartodzieje [bartɔˈd͡ʑɛjɛ] is a village in the administrative district of Gmina Masłowice, within Radomsko County, Łódź Voivodeship, in central Poland.
