= Czarnocin, Łódź Voivodeship =

Czarnocin
- Village
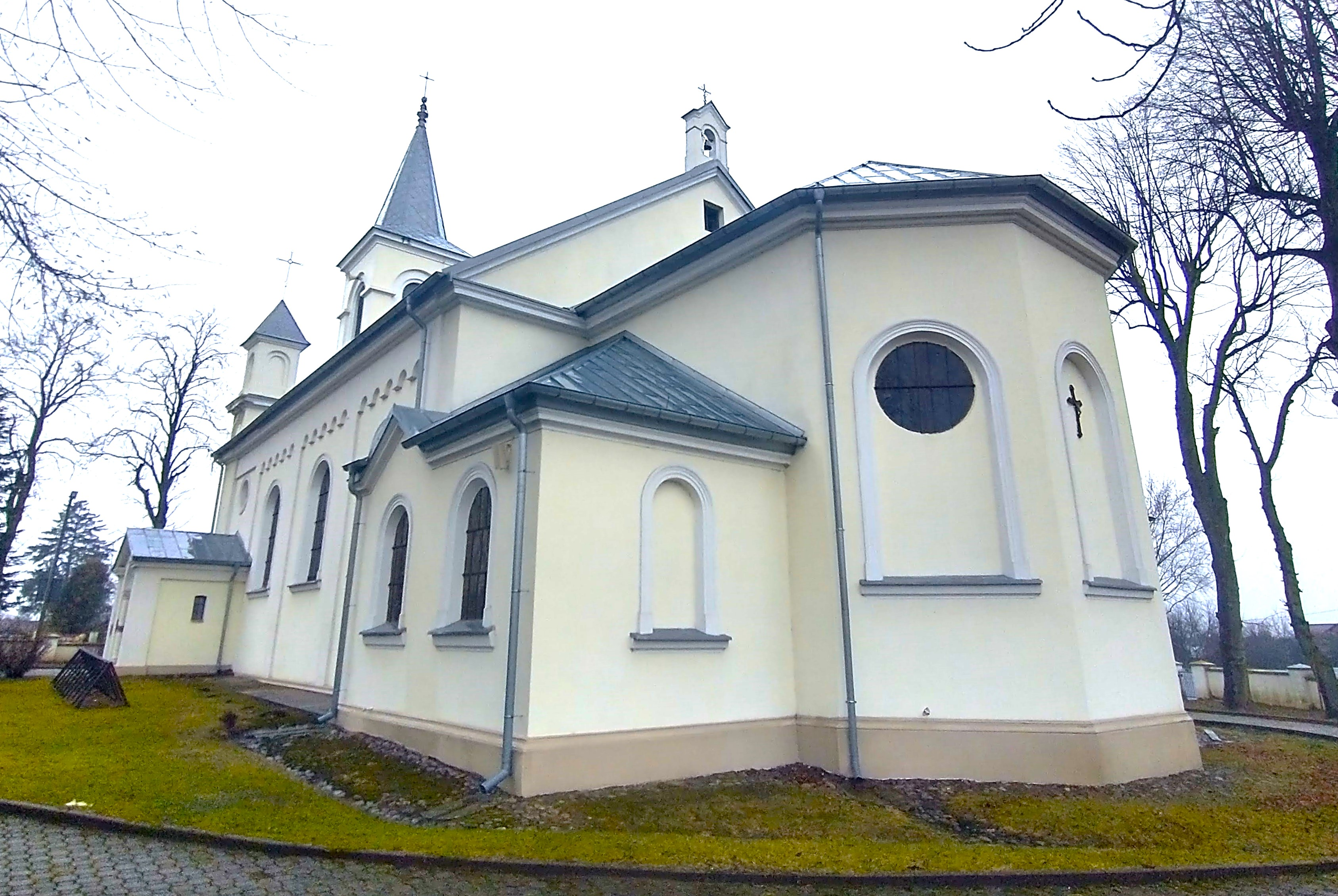
- Catholic church

- Location within Poland
- Coordinates: 51°34′N 19°40′E
- Country: Poland
- Voivodeship: Łódź
- County: Piotrków
- Gmina: Czarnocin

Population
  - Total: 1,300
- Postal code: 97-318

Czarnocin [t͡ʂarˈnɔt͡ɕin] is a village in Piotrków County, Łódź Voivodeship, in central Poland. It is the seat of the gmina (administrative district) called Gmina Czarnocin.
