= Strzelce Małe, Łódź Voivodeship =

Strzelce Małe
- Village
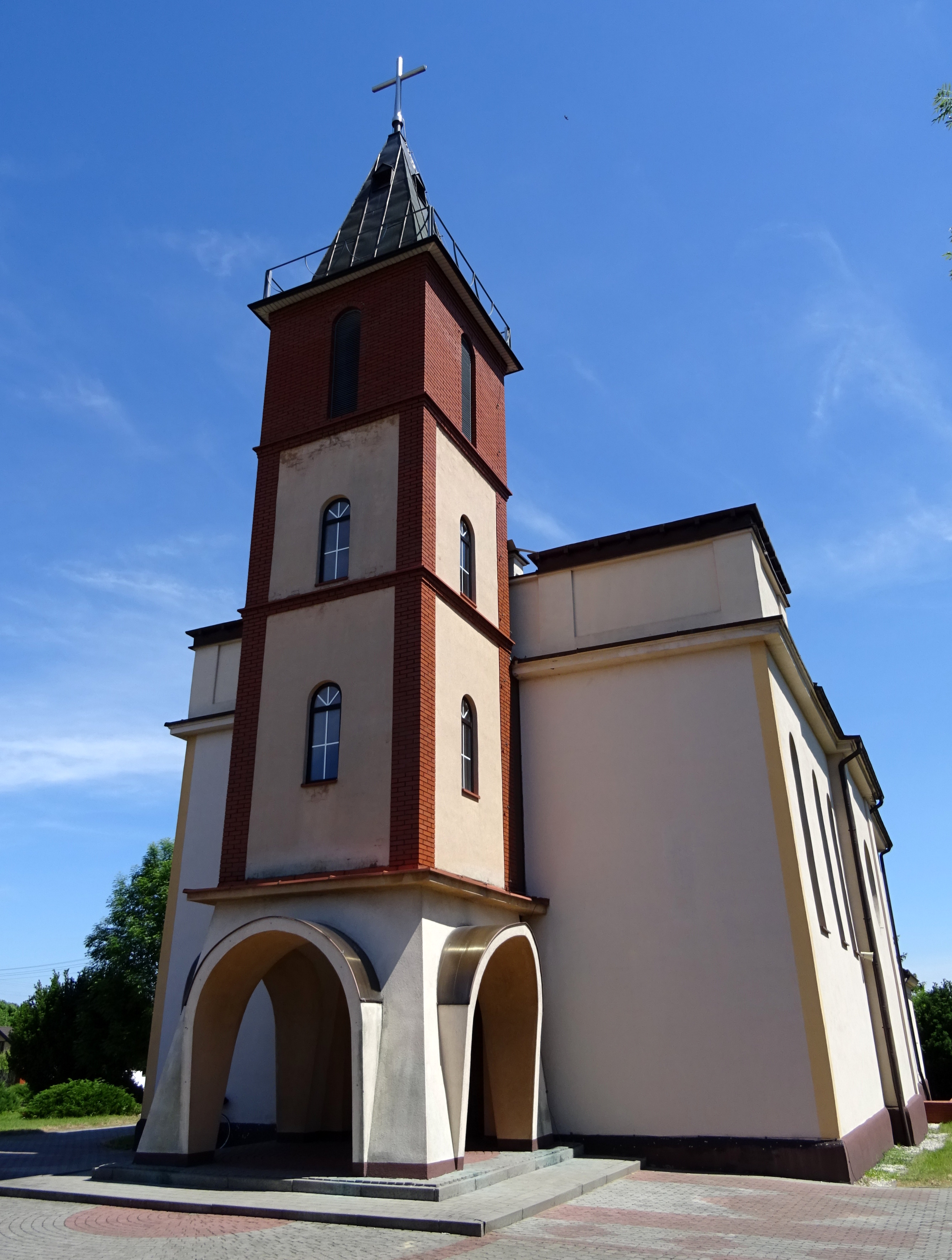
- Catholic church

- Location within Poland
- Coordinates: 51°5′58″N 19°47′26″E
- Country: Poland
- Voivodeship: Łódź
- County: Radomsko
- Gmina: Masłowice

Strzelce Małe [ˈstʂɛlt͡sɛ ˈmawɛ] is a village in the administrative district of Gmina Masłowice, within Radomsko County, Łódź Voivodeship, in central Poland.
