= Piotrków County =

Piotrków County Powiat piotrkowski
- County
- Flag Coat of arms

- Location within the voivodeship
- Coordinates (Piotrków Trybunalski): 51°24′N 19°41′E
- Country: Poland
- Voivodeship: Łódź
- Seat: Piotrków Trybunalski
- Gminas: Total 11: Gmina Aleksandrów; Gmina Czarnocin; Gmina Gorzkowice; Gmina Grabica; Gmina Łęki Szlacheckie; Gmina Moszczenica; Gmina Ręczno; Gmina Rozprza; Gmina Sulejów; Gmina Wola Krzysztoporska; Gmina Wolbórz

Area
  - Total: 1,429.12 km^{2} (551.79 sq mi)

Population (2006)
  - Total: 90,227
  - Density: 63.135/km^{2} (163.52/sq mi)
  - Urban: 6,387
  - Rural: 83,840
- Car plates: EPI
- Website: www.powiat-piotrkowski.pl

Piotrków County (Polish: powiat piotrkowski) is a unit of territorial administration and local government (powiat) in Łódź Voivodeship, central Poland. It came into being on 1 January 1999 as a result of the Polish local government reforms passed in 1998. Its administrative seat is the city of Piotrków Trybunalski, although the city is not part of the county (it constitutes a separate city county). The only towns in Piotrków County are Sulejów, which lies 15 km (9 mi) east of Piotrków Trybunalski, and Wolbórz (classed as a town since 1 January 2011).

The county covers an area of 1,429.12 square kilometres (551.8 sq mi). In 2006, its total population was 90,227, made up of 6,387 in Sulejów and a rural population of 83,840.

== Neighbouring counties ==
Apart from the city of Piotrków Trybunalski, Piotrków County is also bordered by Łódź East County to the north, Tomaszów County and Opoczno County to the east, Radomsko County to the south, Bełchatów County to the west, and Pabianice County to the north-west.

== Administrative divisions ==
The county is subdivided into 11 gminas (two urban-rural and nine rural). These are listed in the following table, in descending order of population.

Gmina	Type	Area (km²)	Population (2006)	Seat
Gmina Sulejów	urban-rural	189.5	15,581	Sulejów
Gmina Moszczenica	rural	111.6	12,766	Moszczenica
Gmina Rozprza	rural	162.5	12,039	Rozprza
Gmina Wola Krzysztoporska	rural	170.4	11,575	Wola Krzysztoporska
Gmina Gorzkowice	rural	102.3	8,631	Gorzkowice
Gmina Wolbórz	urban-rural	151.2	7,646	Wolbórz
Gmina Grabica	rural	127.2	6,087	Grabica
Gmina Aleksandrów	rural	144.0	4,514	Aleksandrów
Gmina Czarnocin	rural	72.7	4,073	Czarnocin
Gmina Łęki Szlacheckie	rural	108.4	3,686	Łęki Szlacheckie
Gmina Ręczno	rural	89.2	3,629	Ręczno
