= Bogdanov =

Bogdanov (Богданов), or its feminine form Bogdanova (Богданова), is a common Russian and Bulgarian surname, derived by a genitive inflection from the given name Bogdan. In a number of cases in the Russian Empire the surname was given to illegitimate children, interpreting the literal meaning "given by God".

== Notable individuals ==
- Abraham Bogdanove (1888–1946) Russian muralist, artist and educator
- Alexei Alexeivich Bogdanov (1907–1971), Soviet geologist
- Andrei Ivanovich Bogdanov (1692–1766), Russian bibliographer and ethnographer
- Igor and Grichka Bogdanoff (1949–2021/2022), French TV hosts and twin brothers, notable for the Bogdanov affair and numerous internet memes
- Ivan Bogdanov (1897–1942), Soviet military officer
- Ivan Bogdanov (painter) (1855–1932), Russian painter
- Malachi Bogdanov, British theatre director
- Michael Bogdanov (1938–2017), British theatre director
- Mikhail Aleksandrovich Bogdanov (1914–1995), Soviet production designer
- Nikolay Bogdanov-Belsky (1868–1945), Russian painter
- Semen Ilyich Bogdanov (1894–1960), Soviet military officer, Hero of the Soviet Union
- Vladimir Leonidovich Bogdanov (born 1951), Russian oil tycoon
- Jon Bogdanove (Born 1958), American artist

=== Science ===
- Alexander Bogdanov (1873–1928), Belarusian-Russian physician, philosopher, economist, writer and revolutionary
- Anatoli Petrovich Bogdanov (1834–1896), Russian zoologist and anthropologist
- Bogdan Bogdanov (1940–2016), Bulgarian classical philologist, culturologist and translator
- Konstantin Bogdanov (born 1963), Russian anthropologist and philologist
- Modest Bogdanov (1841–1888), Russian zoologist
- Rifkat Bogdanov (1950–2013), Tatar-Russian mathematician

=== Politics ===
- Alexey Bogdanov (born 1973), Belarusian politician
- Andrei Vladimirovich Bogdanov, (born 1970), Russian politician
- Boris Bogdanov (1884–1960), Menshevik revolutionary
- Pyotr Bogdanov (1882–1939), Bolshevik statesman, engineer and economist

=== Sport ===
- Anatoli Bogdanov (born 1981), Russian footballer
- Anatoli Ivanovich Bogdanov (1931–2001), Soviet sport shooter
- Andrei Bogdanov (1958–1999), Russian swimmer
- Eduard Bogdanov (born 1968), Russian football player and coach
- Kitija Bogdanova (born 2004), Latvian luger
- Lyubomir Bogdanov (born 1982), Bulgarian football player
- Maksims Bogdanovs (born 1989), Latvian motorcycle speedway rider
- Petar Bogdanov (born 1948), Bulgarian high jumper
- Sergei Dmitriyevich Bogdanov (born 1977), Russian footballer
- Valeri Bogdanov (footballer, born 1952), Russian football player and coach
- Valeri Bogdanov (footballer, born 1966), Russian football player

== Bogdanova ==
- Anna Bogdanova (born 1984), Russian heptathlete
- Galina Bogdanova (1925–2013), Russian grinder and production leader
- Krasimira Bogdanova (1949–1992), Bulgarian basketball player
- Ludmila Bogdanova, penname of Belarusian writer Rakitina Nika (born 1963)
- Lyudmila Bogdanova (born 1983), Russian judoka
- Margarita Louis-Dreyfus (born 1962), née Bogdanova
- Nadezhda Bogdanova (1836–1897), Russian dancer with an international career, prima ballerina of Paris Opera and Bolshoi Theatre.
- Olga Bogdanova (born 1951), actress
- Olga Bogdanova (born 1994), Estonian rhythmic gymnast
- Svetlana Bogdanova (handballer) (born 1964), Russian handball player
- Svetlana Bogdanova (water polo) (born 1976), Russian water polo player
- Yuliya Bogdanova (born 1964), Soviet swimmer
- Viktoria Bogdanova (born 1994), Estonian rhythmic gymnast
- Glikeriya Bogdanova-Chesnokova (1904–1983), Soviet theatre and film actress

== Bogdanovs ==
- Maksims Bogdanovs (born 1989), Latvian motorcycle speedway rider

== See also ==
- Bogdanów (disambiguation)
- Bogdan
- Bogdani
