= Alexei Bogdanov =

Alexei Bogdanov may refer to:

- Alexei Alexeivich Bogdanov, Soviet geologist
- Alexei Bogdanov (chemist and molecular biologist)
- Alexey Bogdanov, Belarusian politician
