= Praca =

Praca may refer to:

- Praca, Łódź Voivodeship, a village in central Poland
- Praca, a Polish civilian tanker hijacked in 1953 during the naval blockade by the Republic of China
- Prača (river), in Bosnia and Herzegovina
- Prača, Pale, Istočno Sarajevo, a village in Bosnia
- Prača, Pale, Bosnian-Podrinje Canton Goražde, a village in Bosnia
- Prača, Dimitrovgrad, a village in Serbia
- Prača (mountain), a mountain in Split-Dalmatia County, Croatia
