= Prača =

Prača may refer to:

- Prača (river), in Bosnia and Herzegovina
- Prača, Pale, Istočno Sarajevo, a village in Bosnia
- Prača, Pale, Bosnian-Podrinje Canton Goražde, a village in Bosnia
- Prača, Dimitrovgrad, a village in Serbia
- Prača (mountain), a mountain in Split-Dalmatia County, Croatia
