= Poraj =

Poraj may refer to:

- Poraj coat of arms
- Poraj, Lublin Voivodeship (east Poland)
- Poraj, Łódź Voivodeship (central Poland)
- Poraj, Subcarpathian Voivodeship (south-east Poland)
- Poraj, Świętokrzyskie Voivodeship (south-central Poland)
- Poraj, Greater Poland Voivodeship (west-central Poland)
- Poraj, Silesian Voivodeship (south Poland)
- Poraj, Pomeranian Voivodeship (north Poland)
