= RBG-Azimuth =

Quarterly Ukrainian science fiction magazine

- Editor: Yulia Gavrilenko
- Categories: science fiction short stories
- Frequency: Quarterly
- Founded: 2006
- Final issue: 2021
- Country: Ukraine
- Language: Russian and Ukrainian

RBG-Azimuth (GDC-Azimuth) was a quarterly Ukrainian bilingual (Russophone and Ukrainophone) science fiction magazine, published since 2006. Its stories were written in the Russian language by authors living around the world. This included authors from Ukraine, Russia, Belarus, Lithuania, the United States, and others. The magazine name is an abbreviation that means “guidelines for damage control” in Russian “Руководство по Борьбе за Живучесть" (РБЖ).

RBG-Azimuth exclusively published one type of material - short stories. Each issue contained 10-13 stories. It claimed to revive traditions of the classic science fiction of the 1970-1980s (like Isaac Asimov, Clifford Simak, Robert Sheckley, Boris and Arkady Strugatsky). Its aim was to publish stories that help people live a better life. Since 2010 RBG-Azimuth and Hanna Concern Publishing issued books with set of the best sci-fi stories of the year.

The magazine was nominated on Eurocon from Ukraine as the Best Magazine in 2010 and 2011 years. One of the authors is Nika Rakitina, who had received the ESFS encouragement award (Belarus) in Eurocon-2008.

== Editors ==
- P. Amnuel, PhD (Israel)
- Y. Gavrilenko, PhD (Russia), general editor
- S. Zhilevich (Belarus)
- V. Yatsenko (Ukraine), president
- I. Shlosberg (USA)
