= Bogdan Bogdanov =

Bulgarian classical scholar and translator

- Native name: Богдан Богданов
- Born: Богдан Богданов; November 2, 1940 Sofia, Kingdom of Bulgaria
- Died: August 5, 2016 (aged 75) Sofia, Bulgaria
- Occupation: Classical philologist, culturologist, translator, university professor
- Employer(s): Sofia University, New Bulgarian University
- Notable awards: Grand Cross of the Order of the Phoenix

Website
- www.bogdanbogdanov.net

Bogdan Bogdanov (2 November 1940 – 5 August 2016) was a Bulgarian classical philologist, culturologist, translator, public intellectual, and university professor. He was the founder and first president of New Bulgarian University (NBU), one of the leading private universities in Bulgaria, and a long-time professor of ancient Greek literature and culture at Sofia University.

== Early life and education ==
Bogdanov was born in Sofia on 2 November 1940. He graduated in Classical Philology from Sofia University in 1963. He later specialized at the National and Kapodistrian University of Athens in 1978 and at the University of Amsterdam in 1984.

== Academic and public career ==
Bogdanov was among the leading Bulgarian scholars in the fields of classical philology, ancient Greek culture, hermeneutics, and cultural studies. He authored numerous books, essays, and translations from Ancient Greek into Bulgarian. His scholarly work focused on ancient literature, myth, oral culture, and the philosophy of reading.

Following the fall of communism in Bulgaria, Bogdanov became one of the prominent intellectual advocates for educational reform and liberal arts education in Bulgaria. In 1990 he co-founded the Society for a New Bulgarian University and participated in the establishment of the Bulgarian branch of the Open Society Fund.

In 1991, after a resolution by the Bulgarian Parliament, Bogdanov founded New Bulgarian University, the first private university in post-communist Bulgaria, and served as its president and later chairman of the Board of Trustees.

Between 1991 and 1993, Bogdanov served as Ambassador of Bulgaria to Greece.

In 2010, documents released by the Bulgarian Commission for Dossiers revealed that Bogdanov had collaborated with the Sixth Directorate of the State Security services between 1978 and 1988.

== Works ==
Bogdanov published extensively in Bulgarian on classical antiquity, philosophy, literature, and culture theory. Among his better-known books are studies on ancient Greek culture, myth, and reading practices.

In 2010, Bogdanov's book Reading and its Functioning: From Ancient Greek Literature to the Modern World was published in Berlin.

== Bogdan Bogdanov Humanities Award ==
In 2016, the Board of Trustees of New Bulgarian University established the Bogdan Bogdanov Humanities Award in Bogdanov's memory. The annual national award recognizes outstanding achievements in the humanities, culture, arts, education, and public life in Bulgaria, reflecting the intellectual and civic values associated with Bogdanov's work and legacy. The award is traditionally presented around 2 November, Bogdanov's birth date.

Recipients of the award have included poet Boris Hristov (2017), literary historian Mihail Nedelchev (2018), actress Snezhina Petrova and classicist Georgi Gochev (2019), conductor Nayden Todorov (2020), sociologist Georgy Fotev (2021), philosopher and photographer Tsocho Boyadzhiev (2022), opera singer Raina Kabaivanska (2023), neurologist Ivaylo Tarnev (2024), and writer Theodora Dimova (2025).

== Death ==
Bogdanov died in Sofia on 5 August 2016 at the age of 75.
