= Valery Bogdanov =

Valery Bogdanov may refer to:

- Valery Bogdanov (footballer, born 1952), Russian football player and coach
- Valery Bogdanov (footballer, born 1966), Russian football player
