= Gąski =

Gąski may refer to the following places:

- Gąski, Kuyavian-Pomeranian Voivodeship (north-central Poland)
- Gąski, Łódź Voivodeship (central Poland)
- Gąski, Ciechanów County in Masovian Voivodeship (east-central Poland)
- Gąski, Grójec County in Masovian Voivodeship (east-central Poland)
- Gąski, Ostrołęka County in Masovian Voivodeship (east-central Poland)
- Gąski, Piaseczno County in Masovian Voivodeship (east-central Poland)
- Gąski, Olecko County in Warmian-Masurian Voivodeship (north Poland)
- Gąski, Ostróda County in Warmian-Masurian Voivodeship (north Poland)
- Gąski, Koszalin County in West Pomeranian Voivodeship (north-west Poland)
- Gąski, Szczecinek County in West Pomeranian Voivodeship (north-west Poland)
