= Yuliya Kancheva =

Bulgarian actress (1956–2019)

- Юлия Кънчева
- Born: 1 July 1956; Sofia, Bulgaria
- Died: 11 June 2019 (aged 62); Sofia, Bulgaria
- Known for: A Bulgarian film producer, director and actress

Yuliya Kancheva (7 July 1956 – 11 June 2019) was a Bulgarian actor, television producer and film director.

== Biography ==
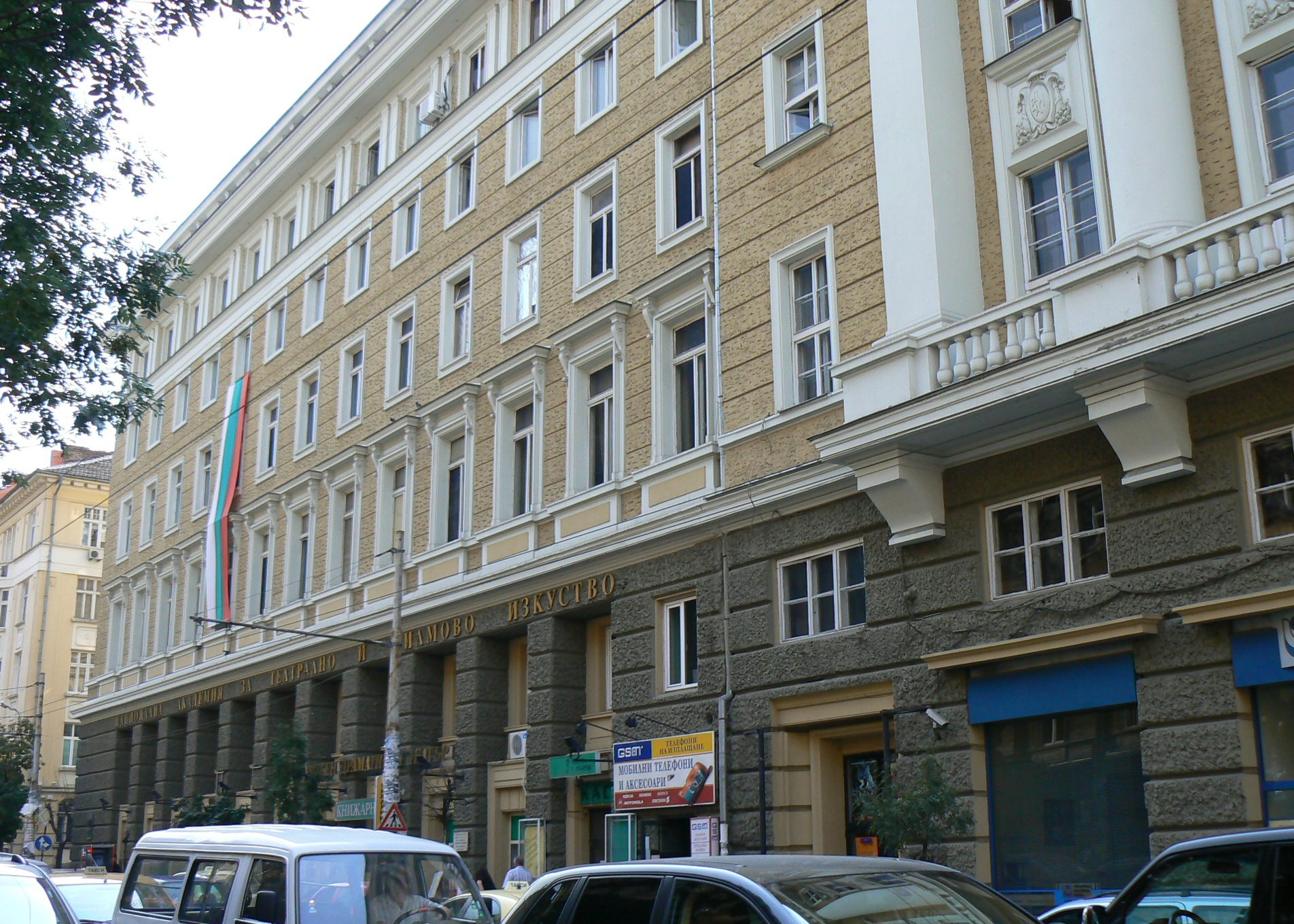
The National Academy for Theatre and Film Arts

Kancheva was born on 1 July 1956 in Sofia, Bulgaria. She graduated from the Krastyo Sarafov National Academy for Theatre and Film Arts in Sofia in 1980 with a specialty in film directing, studying under professor Yanko Yankov.

Kancheva was an author and director of 17 documentary movies, two TV series, one feature-length short story, a TV feature film, and several TV shows made for the Bulgarian National Television (BNT).

Kancheva was a member of the International Documentary Association (IDA), as well as the National Union of Bulgarian Film Makers, and the National Bulgarian Union of Journalists.

The New Bulgarian University named her "Teacher of the Year" in 2008.

== Awards received ==
In 1989, Yuliya Kancheva received the "Silver Dragon" award from the Film Festival in Krakow, Poland, for the movie "Zhivotat e pred nas", (1988).

== Filmography ==
=== As a director or a producer ===
- Bez Semeina Prilika (2004)
- Made in Bulgaria (1992)
- Viensko Kolelo (1991)
- Zhivotat e pred nas (1988)

=== As an actress ===
- Yudino Zhelyazo (1989)
- Adios, Muchachos (1978)
