= Miłaków =

Miłaków may refer to the following places:

- Miłaków, Łódź Voivodeship (central Poland)
- Miłaków, Lubusz Voivodeship (west Poland)
- Miłaków, Świętokrzyskie Voivodeship (south-central Poland)
