= Bogdanów =

Bogdanów or Bogdanow may refer to:

- Bogdanów, Lower Silesian Voivodeship (south-west Poland)
- Bogdanów, Łódź Voivodeship (central Poland)
- Bogdanów, Lesser Poland Voivodeship (south Poland)
- Bogdanów, Greater Poland Voivodeship (west-central Poland)
- Bogdanów, Opole Voivodeship (south-west Poland)
- Wolfgang Bogdanow, fictional character in Sense8
- Larry Bogdanow (1947–2011), American restaurant architect
- Maksims Bogdanow (born 1989), Latvian motorcycle speedway rider
