= Gomulin-Kolonia =

- Village
- Location within Poland
- Coordinates: 51°24′56″N 19°34′00″E
- Country: Poland
- Voivodeship: Łódź
- County: Piotrków
- Gmina: Wola Krzysztoporska

Gomulin-Kolonia [ɡɔˈmulin kɔˈlɔɲa] is a village in the administrative district of Gmina Wola Krzysztoporska, within Piotrków County, Łódź Voivodeship, in central Poland.
