= New Bulgarian University =

Private university in Sofia, Bulgaria

Coordinates: 42°40′39″N 23°15′11″E

- Нов български университет
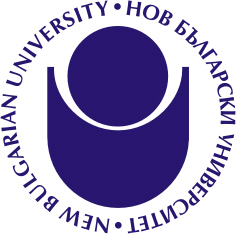
- Motto: Ne varietatem timeamus
- Motto in English: Do not fear variety
- Type: Private
- Established: 18 September 1991
- Rector: Plamen Doinov
- Students: 12,000
- Undergraduates: 54 programmes
- Postgraduates: 100 programmes
- Doctoral students: 35 programmes
- Location: Sofia, Bulgaria
- Campus: Urban
- Website: www.nbu.bg

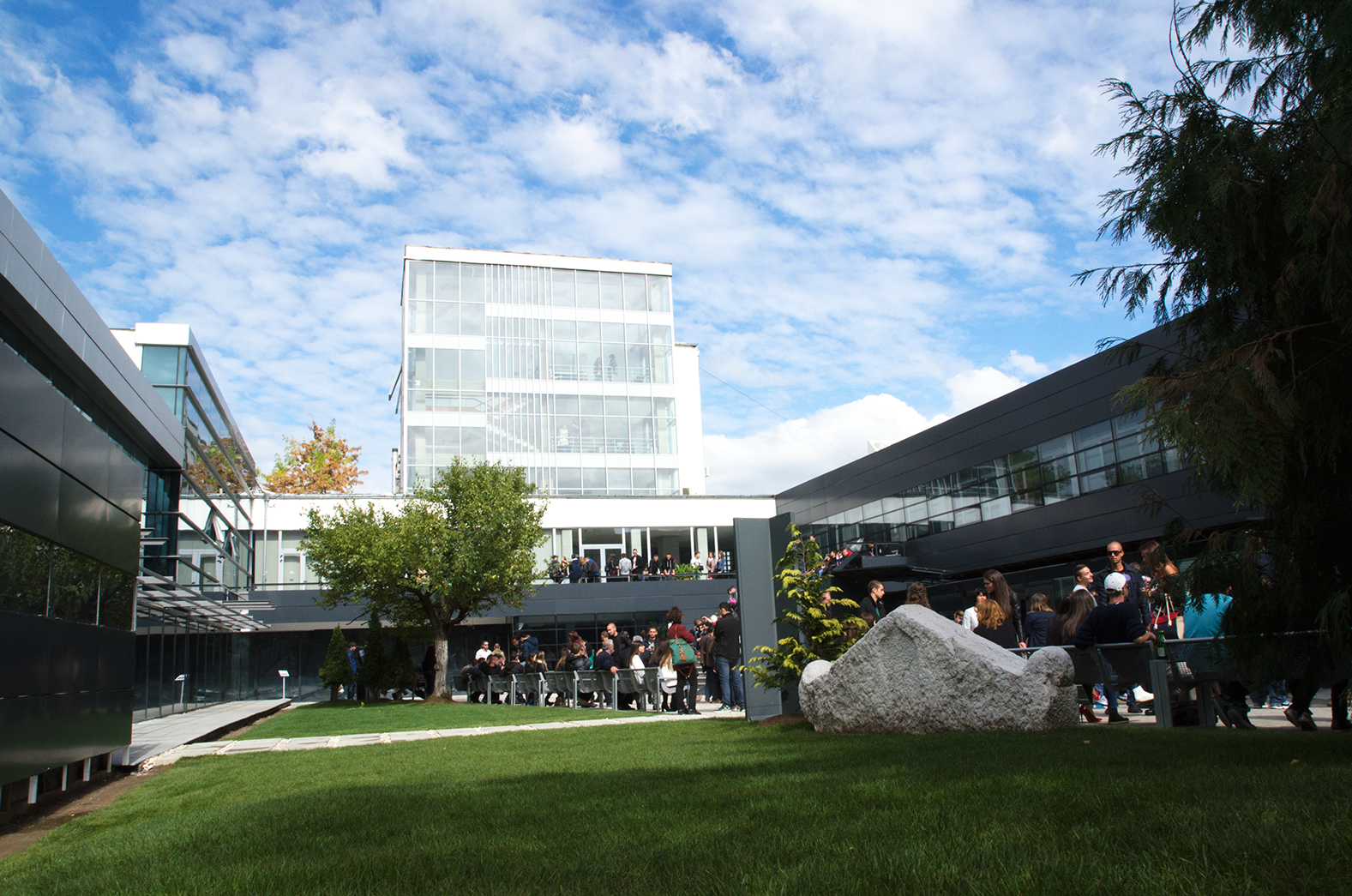
Opening of the academic year 2015–2016. September 30th, 2015. Patio of the New Bulgarian University

New Bulgarian University (Bulgarian: Нов български университет, also known and abbreviated as НБУ, NBU) is a private university based in Sofia, Bulgaria.

Its campus is in the western district of the city, known for its proximity to the Vitosha nature park. The university also owns multiple other buildings across the country, as well as its own publishing house and a library.

Among the list of NBU Honorary Doctors and Honorary Professors are Richard Rorty, Thomas Sebeok, Wolfgang Iser, Terry Eagleton, Julia Kristeva, Jean-Pierre Vernant, Ralf Dahrendorf, Steve Forbes, Geert Hofstede, Ennio Morricone, Milcho Leviev, Raina Kabaivanska, Alexander Fol, Vera Mutafchieva, and Georgy Fotev.

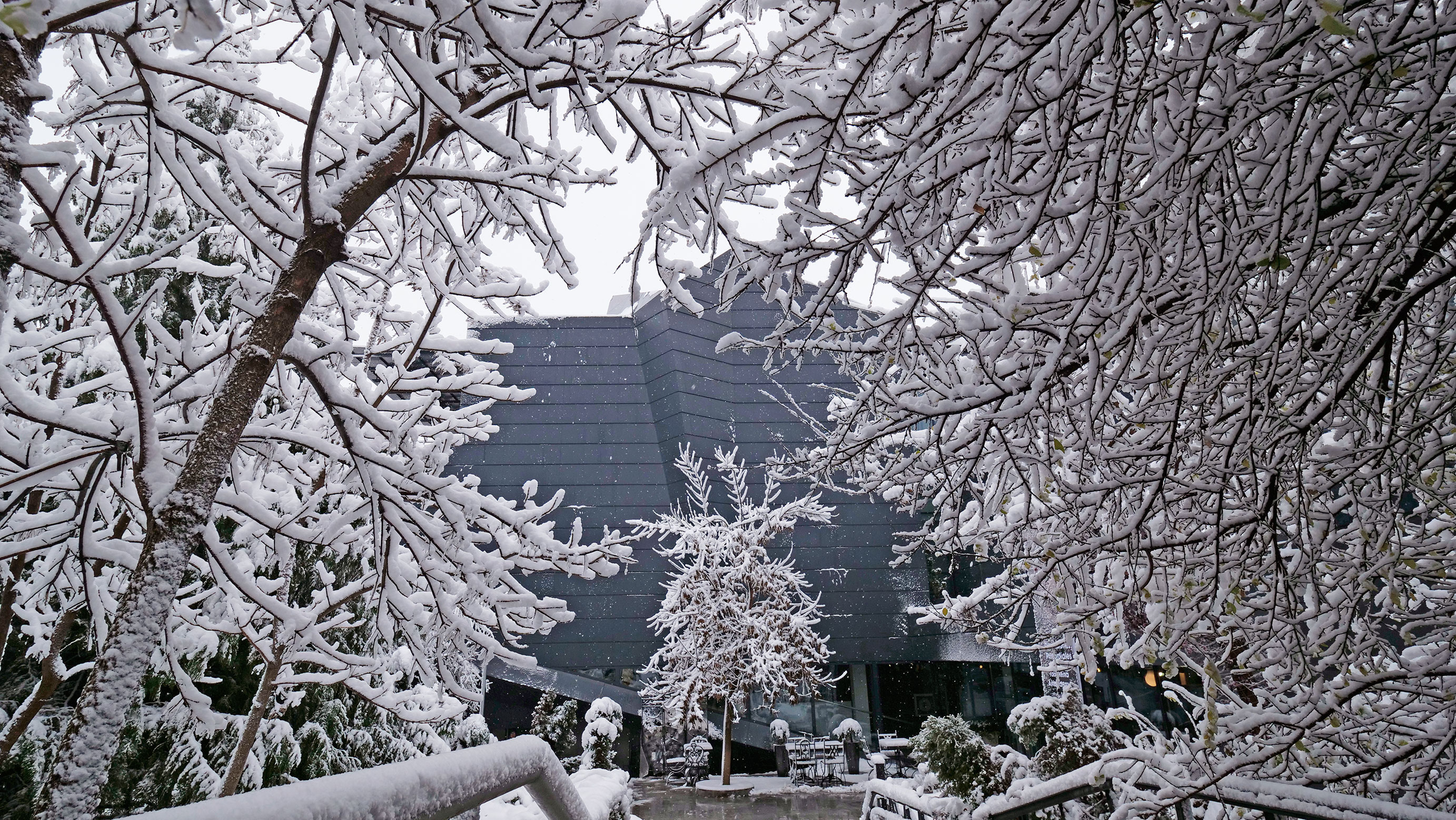
Patio of the New Bulgarian University in snow, November 2021

Since 2004, NBU has been an accredited partner of The Open University Business School.

== History ==
NBU was established on 18 September 1991 by Bogdan Bogdanov and a group of Bulgarian intellectuals with a resolution by the Bulgarian Parliament. NBU's main purpose was to modernise Bulgarian higher education. 2,500 students were welcomed during the first year. A test of general education was introduced in 1995 and established as a uniform standard for the reception of students in 1996.

NBU's Educational Museum was founded on 23 April 2010. The first exhibition was "Museum Network Resources". It was the final stage of the project "Educational Museum at New Bulgarian University". The project was funded by the National Fund for Research at the Ministry of Education, Youth and Science, the Cultural Heritage (study on national historic and culture legacy as a part of European culture heritage and advanced methods for preserving).

Since 2010, NBU is the home of 'The Slug Theater', where the university's drama club present their shows.

== Campus ==
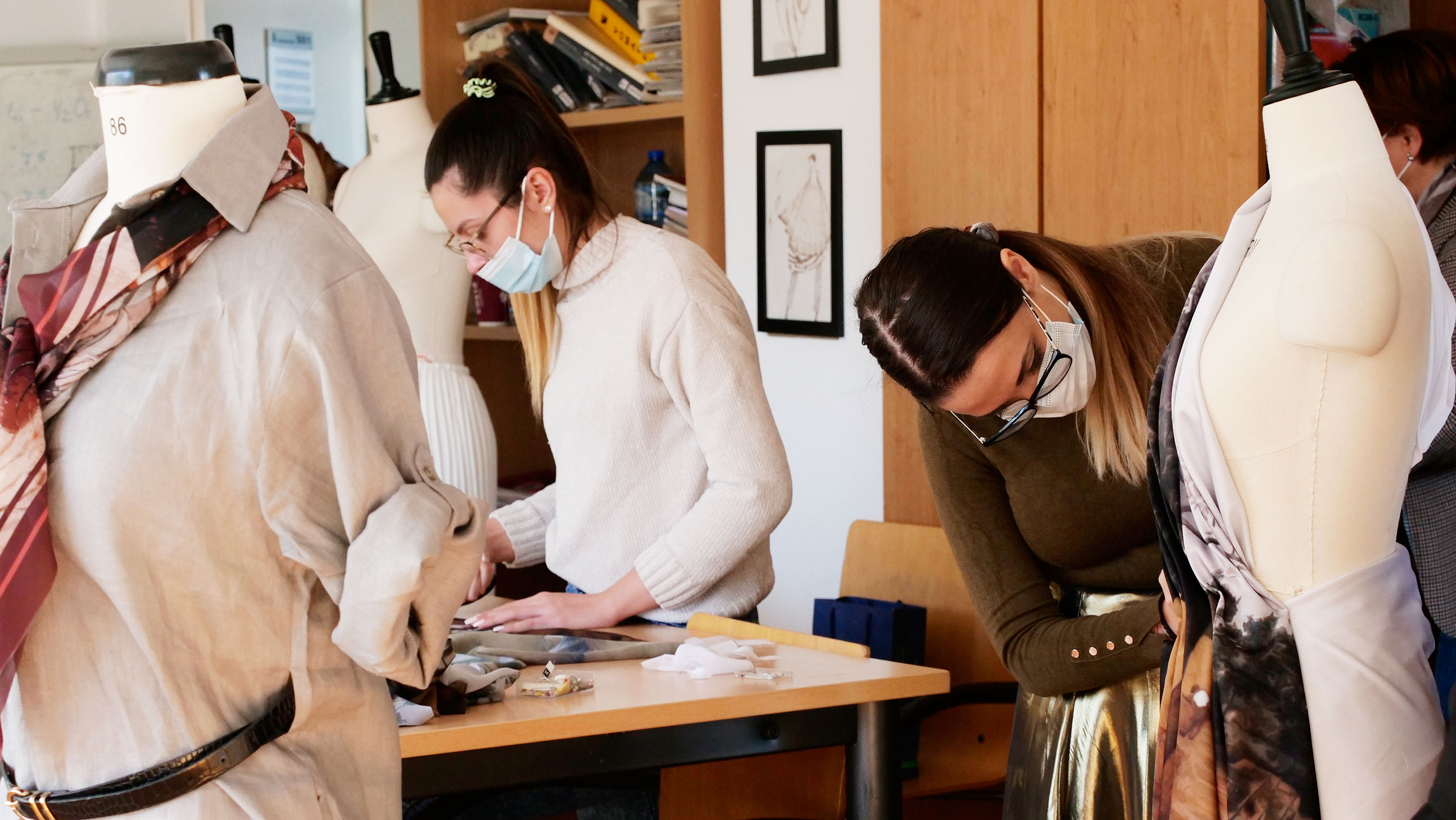
Students from the Design Department of the New Bulgarian University, November 2021

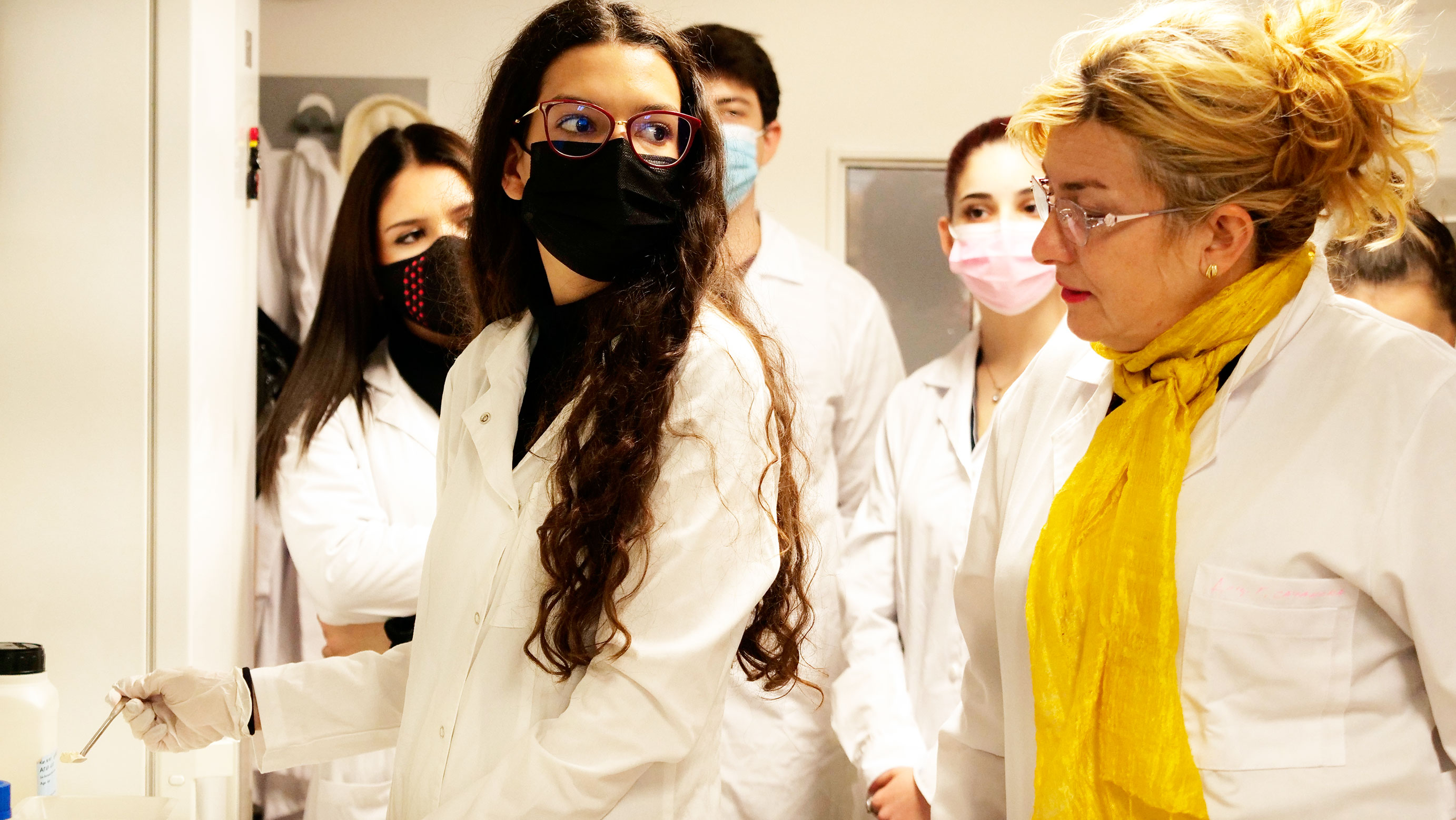
Assoc. Prof. Dr. Galina Sachanska, Head of the Department of Natural Sciences, with students from the Bachelor's program in Cellular Biology and Virology, November 2021

The campus consists of two buildings (Buildings 1 and 2) housing the Aula, Library, University Theater, NBU Museum, UniArt Gallery, Medical Center, and a Sports Center surrounded with open green spaces.

The university has more than 100 halls, computer labs, language and simultaneous interpreting labs, a Mock Courtroom, an Arts Center with practice rooms and studios for students of music, fine arts, design and architecture with a total capacity of 2,500 seats.

=== Library ===
NBU's academic library houses over 128,000 items accessed by 150,000 annual visitors.

== Reputation ==
NBU's IT and management departments rank high in the country. As of 2014, NBU ranked second in Bulgaria according to the Webometrics Ranking of World Universities.

== Bogdan Bogdanov Humanities Award ==
The Bogdan Bogdanov Humanities Award is an annual national distinction established by the Board of Trustees of New Bulgarian University on 5 December 2016 in memory of the university's founder, the classical philologist and public intellectual Bogdan Bogdanov.

The award recognizes outstanding achievements in the humanities, culture, arts, and public life in Bulgaria. It is presented annually around 2 November, the birth date of Bogdan Bogdanov. Laureates receive a diploma, plaque, and monetary prize.

=== Laureates ===
Year	Laureate	Motivation
2017	Boris Hristov	For his contribution to Bulgarian poetry and culture.
2018	Mihail Nedelchev	For contributions to Bulgarian literary history, criticism, and public life.
2019	Snezhina Petrova and Georgi Gochev	For the theatrical and educational project Medea.
2020	Nayden Todorov	For achievements in music, cultural management, and public engagement.
2021	Georgy Fotev	For contributions to sociology and the humanities in Bulgaria.
2022	Tsocho Boyadzhiev	For achievements in philosophy, medieval studies, and photography.
2023	Raina Kabaivanska	For exceptional contributions to music, education, and Bulgarian culture.
2024	Ivaylo Tarnev	For achievements in medicine, teaching, and humanitarian engagement.
2025	Theodora Dimova	For her literary work and civic contribution to contemporary Bulgarian culture.

== Centers ==
=== Central and East European Center for Cognitive Science ===
The Central and East European Center for Cognitive Science (or CEEC of Cognitive Science) undertakes research in fundamental and applied cognitive science. Research topics include: memory, thinking, language, learning, perception, context, applications to robotics, AI, and cognitive systems, cognitive economics, human factors and usability, education and learning methods. The center is co-directed by Boicho Kokinov and Jeff Elman.

The CEEC of Cognitive Science grants M.Sc. and Ph.D. degrees in cognitive science and organizes an annual summer school.

=== Other centers ===
- Bulgarian Center for Human relations
- Center for Social Practices
- Center for Public Administration
- Assessment Center
- South-East European Center for Semiotic Studies

== Departments ==
- National and International Security Studies
- Anthropology
- Archaeology
- Biomedical Sciences
- Cinema, Advertising and Show Business
- Cognitive science and Psychology
- Architecture
- Design
- Earth and Environmental Sciences
- Economics and Business Administration
- Fine Arts
- Foreign Language Education
- Foreign Languages and Literatures
- History
- Informatics
- History of Culture
- Law
- Mass Communications
- Mediterranean and Eastern Studies
- Musical Arts
- New Bulgarian Studies
- Philosophy and Sociology
- Plastic Arts
- Political Sciences
- Theater
- Telecommunications
- Tourism

== Programmes ==
=== Bachelor's ===
- Administration and management
- Anthropology
- Visual arts
- Language and literature
- Natural sciences
- Economics
- Economics (distance learning)
- Information science
- History
- Computer media technologies
- Culture and art
- Hotel and restaurant management
- Hotel and restaurant management (in the French language)
- Mass communications
- Network technologies (in the English language)
- Music
- Plastic arts
- Design and architecture
- Political sciences
- Political sciences (in the French language)
- Psychology
- Theatre
- Telecommunications
- Philosophy
- Foreign languages and culture
- Artes liberales

== See also ==
- Central and East European Center for Cognitive Science
