= Parzniewice Małe =

- Village
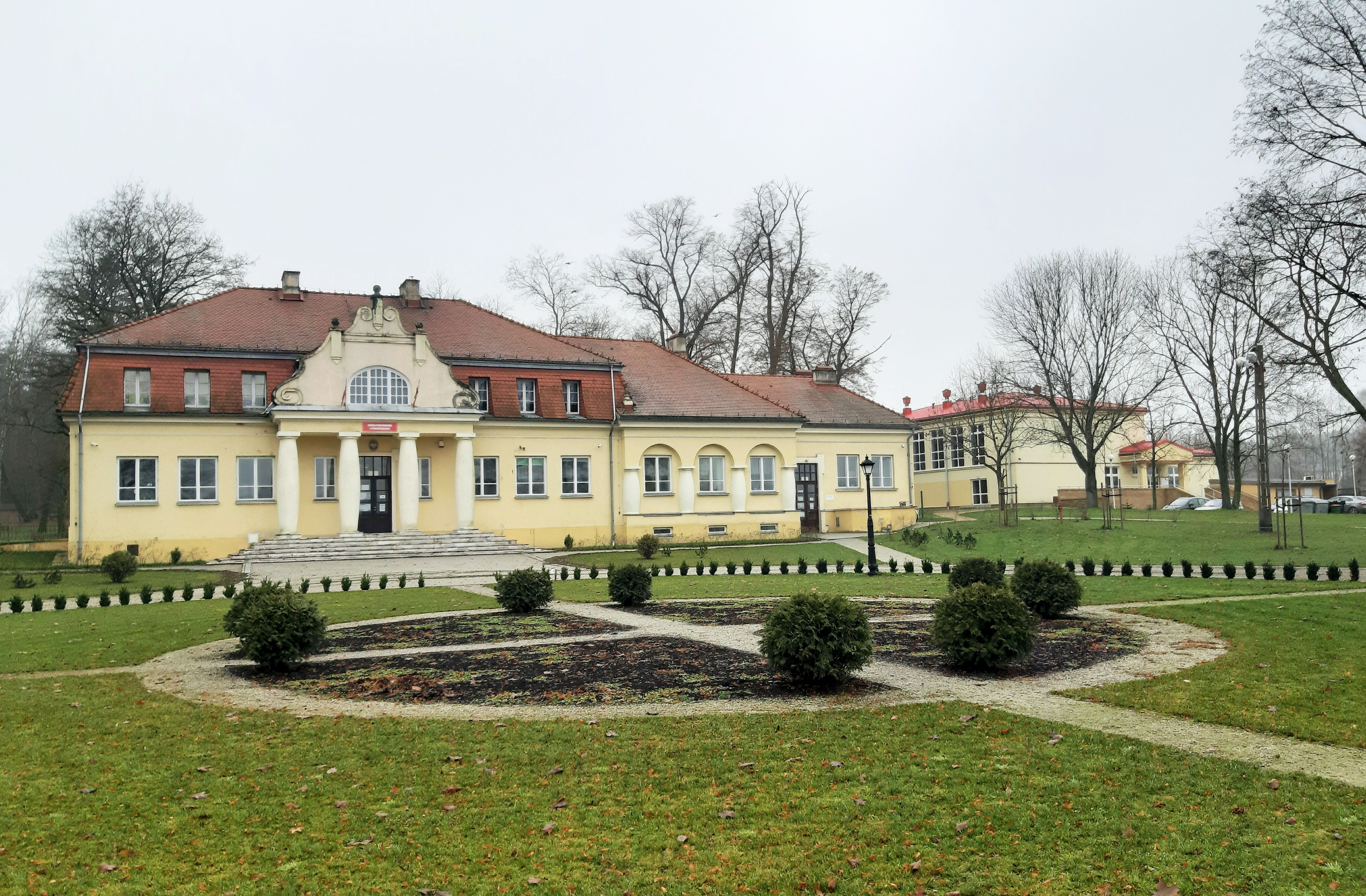

- Location within Poland
- Coordinates: 51°18′N 19°31′E
- Country: Poland
- Voivodeship: Łódź
- County: Piotrków
- Gmina: Wola Krzysztoporska

Parzniewice Małe [paʐɲɛˈvit͡sɛ ˈmawɛ] is a village in the administrative district of Gmina Wola Krzysztoporska, within Piotrków County, Łódź Voivodeship, in central Poland.
