= Central and East European Center for Cognitive Science =

Coordinates: 42°40′39″N 23°15′11″E

The Central and East European Center for Cognitive Science (also as CEEC of Cognitive Science) at the New Bulgarian University undertakes research in fundamental and applied cognitive science. Research topics include: memory, thinking, language, learning, perception, context, applications to robotics, AI, and cognitive systems, cognitive economics, human factors and usability, education and learning methods. The center is co-directed by Boicho Kokinov and Jeff Elman.

The CEEC of Cognitive Science grants M.Sc., Ph.D. degrees in cognitive science and organizes annually summer school.
