= Krzyżanów, Piotrków County =

Krzyżanów
- Village
- Location within Poland
- Coordinates: 51°21′04″N 19°38′45″E
- Country: Poland
- Voivodeship: Łódź
- County: Piotrków
- Gmina: Wola Krzysztoporska

Krzyżanów [kʂɨˈʐanuf] is a village in the administrative district of Gmina Wola Krzysztoporska, within Piotrków County, Łódź Voivodeship, in central Poland.
