= Borowa, Piotrków County =

Borowa
- Village
- Location within Poland
- Coordinates: 51°19′40″N 19°29′25″E
- Country: Poland
- Voivodeship: Łódź
- County: Piotrków
- Gmina: Wola Krzysztoporska

Borowa [bɔˈrɔva] is a village in the administrative district of Gmina Wola Krzysztoporska, within Piotrków County, Łódź Voivodeship, in central Poland.
