= Piaski, Piotrków County =

Piaski
- Village
- Location within Poland
- Coordinates: 51°20′25″N 19°39′40″E
- Country: Poland
- Voivodeship: Łódź
- County: Piotrków
- Gmina: Wola Krzysztoporska
- Time zone: UTC+1 (CET)
  - Summer (DST): UTC+2 (CEST)
- Postal code: 97-371
- Vehicle registration: EPI

Piaski (Polish pronunciation: [ˈpjaskʲi]) is a village in the administrative district of Gmina Wola Krzysztoporska, within Piotrków County, Łódź Voivodeship, in central Poland.
