= Siomki =

- Village
- Location within Poland
- Coordinates: 51°21′N 19°37′E
- Country: Poland
- Voivodeship: Łódź
- County: Piotrków
- Gmina: Wola Krzysztoporska

Siomki [ˈɕɔmki] is a village in the administrative district of Gmina Wola Krzysztoporska, within Piotrków County, Łódź Voivodeship, in central Poland.
