= Kargał-Las =

- Village
- Location within Poland
- Coordinates: 51°23′22″N 19°37′30″E
- Country: Poland
- Voivodeship: Łódź
- County: Piotrków
- Gmina: Wola Krzysztoporska

Kargał-Las [ˈkarɡau̯ ˈlas] is a village in Gmina Wola Krzysztoporska, Piotrków County, Łódź Voivodeship, Poland.
