= Bogdanów-Kolonia =

Village in Poland

- Village
- Location within Poland
- Coordinates: 51°20′N 19°30′E
- Country: Poland
- Voivodeship: Łódź
- County: Piotrków
- Gmina: Wola Krzysztoporska
- Population: 180

Bogdanów-Kolonia [bɔɡˈdanuf kɔˈlɔɲa] is a village in the administrative district of Gmina Wola Krzysztoporska, within Piotrków County, Łódź Voivodeship, in central Poland.
