= Kamienna, Piotrków County =

Kamienna
- Village
- Location within Poland
- Coordinates: 51°20′N 19°32′E
- Country: Poland
- Voivodeship: Łódź
- County: Piotrków
- Gmina: Wola Krzysztoporska

Kamienna [kaˈmjɛnna] is a village in the administrative district of Gmina Wola Krzysztoporska, within Piotrków County, Łódź Voivodeship, in central Poland.
