= Majków Duży =

- Village
- Location within Poland
- Coordinates: 51°25′12″N 19°36′44″E
- Country: Poland
- Voivodeship: Łódź
- County: Piotrków
- Gmina: Wola Krzysztoporska

Majków Duży (Polish pronunciation: [ˈmajkuv ˈduʐɨ]) is a village in the administrative district of Gmina Wola Krzysztoporska, within Piotrków County, Łódź Voivodeship, in central Poland.
