= Moników =

Village in Gmina Wola Krzysztoporska, Poland

- Village
- Location within Poland
- Coordinates: 51°20′16″N 19°29′25″E
- Country: Poland
- Voivodeship: Łódź
- County: Piotrków
- Gmina: Wola Krzysztoporska

Moników [mɔˈnikuf] is a village in the administrative district of Gmina Wola Krzysztoporska, within Piotrków County, Łódź Voivodeship, in central Poland.
