= Bujny, Łódź Voivodeship =

Bujny
- Village
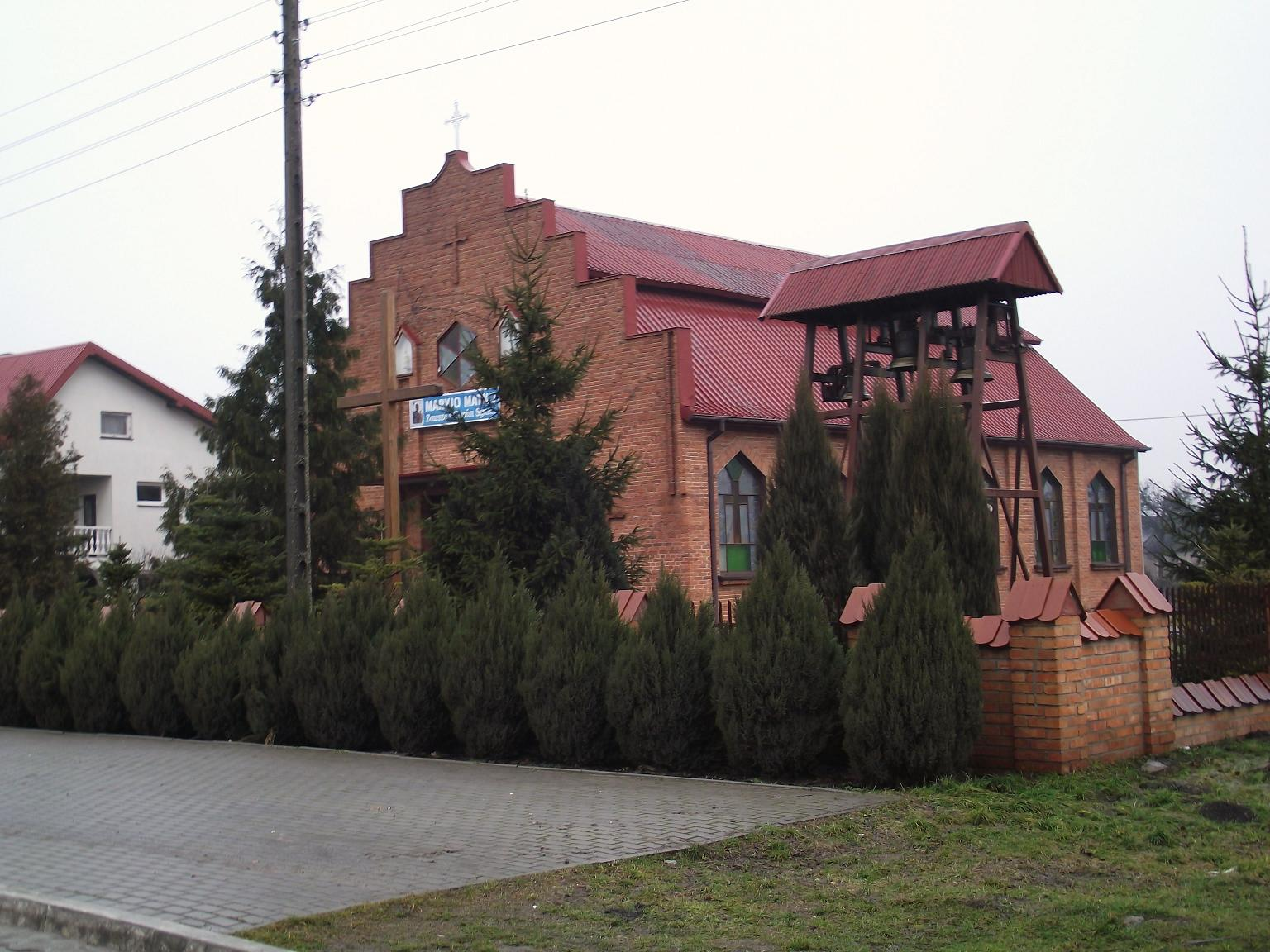
- Parish church in Bujny

- Location within Poland
- Coordinates: 51°22′N 19°38′E
- Country: Poland
- Voivodeship: Łódź
- County: Piotrków
- Gmina: Wola Krzysztoporska
- Population: 750

Bujny (Polish pronunciation: [ˈbujnɨ]) is a village in the administrative district of Gmina Wola Krzysztoporska, within Piotrków County, Łódź Voivodeship, in central Poland.
