= Gomulin =

- Village
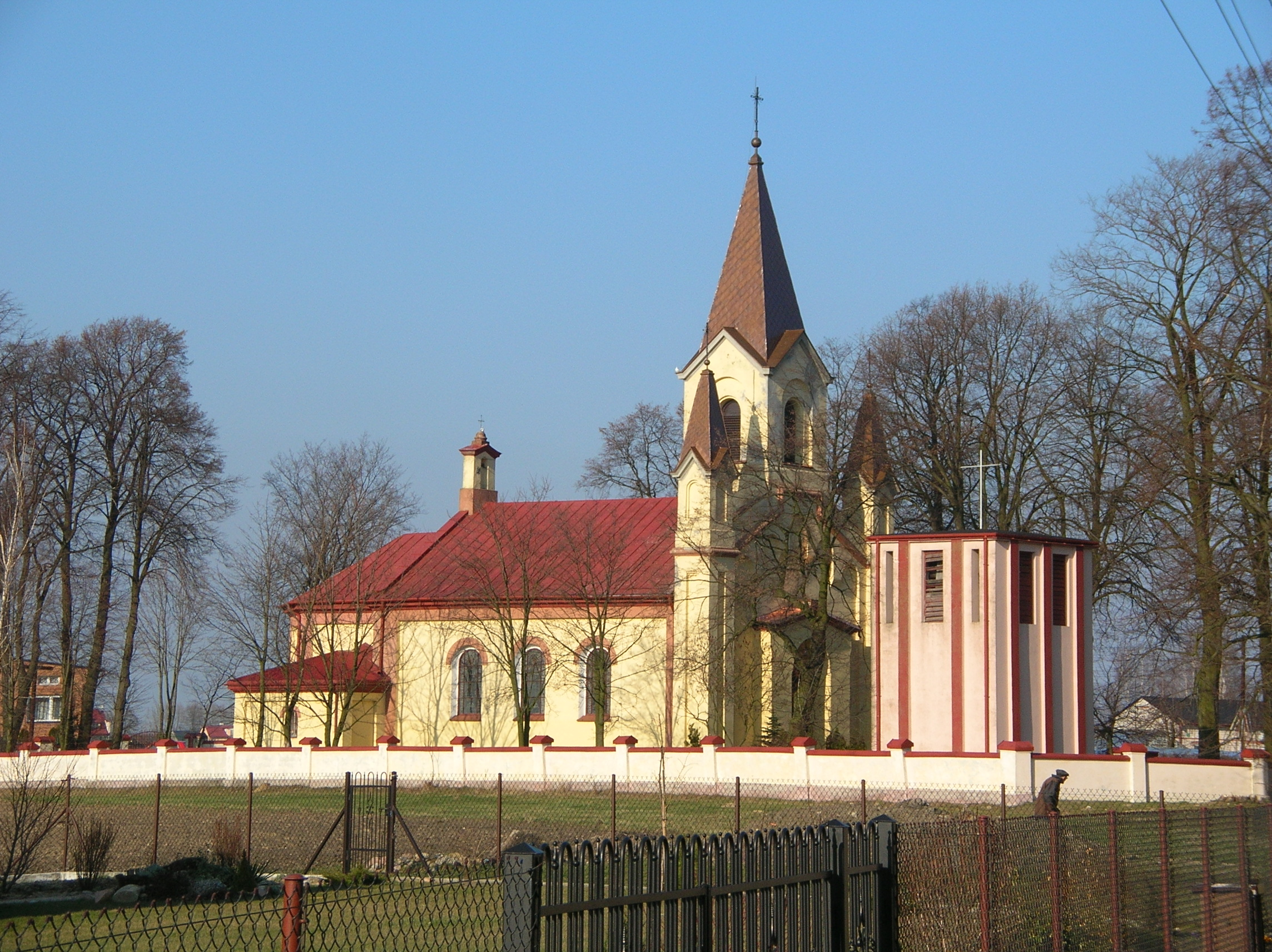
- Church

- Location within Poland
- Coordinates: 51°25′19″N 19°33′30″E
- Country: Poland
- Voivodeship: Łódź
- County: Piotrków
- Gmina: Wola Krzysztoporska
- Population (approx.): 380

Gomulin [ɡɔˈmulin] is a village in the administrative district of Gmina Wola Krzysztoporska, within Piotrków County, Łódź Voivodeship, in central Poland.

The village has an approximate population of 960.
