= Boicho Kokinov =

Bulgarian associate professor

Boicho Kokinov (Bulgarian: Бойчо Кокинов, 27 December 1960 – 10 May 2013) was an associate professor in cognitive science and computer science at the New Bulgarian University and the director of the Central and East European Center for Cognitive Science.

He was the main organizer of the series of the Annual Summer Schools in Cognitive Science from 1994 until his death.

== Early life and education ==
Kokinov received his PhD at the Bulgarian Academy of Sciences, Sofia.

== Research interests ==
His research interests included understanding human thinking and memory: analogy-making, problem solving, decision-making, judgment, context, constructive memory, memory distortions, blending of episodes. He developed the DUAL Cognitive Architecture and a number of models based on it: AMBR (a model of analogy-making and memory) together with Alexander Petrov, Maurice Grinberg, Georgi Petkov, and Ivan Vankov; JUDGEMAP (a model of judgment) together with Georgi Petkov. Experimental data has been collected in support of these models: dissimilar episodes can be blended as result of a double analogy with a third episode (with Neda Zareva); analogical episodes are easier to blend than superficially similar ones (with Veselina Feldman); analogy helps children to do relational mapping and transitive inference (with Milena Mutafchieva); simple analogies are done automatically and without awareness (with Penka Hristova); comparing relations in analogy requires parallel mental simulations of body actions (with Ivan Vankov); anxiety restricts analogy generation (with Veselina Feldman).

== Publications ==
- Kokinov, B., Holyoak, K., Gentner, D. eds. (2009). New Frontiers in Analogy Research. Sofia: NBU Press
- Kokinov, B., Richardson, D., Roth-Berghofer, Th., Vieu, L. eds. (2007) Modeling and Using Context. Lecture Notes in Computer Science (Lecture Notes in Artificial Intelligence), vol. 4635, Berlin: Springer Verlag
- Kokinov, B. ed. (2005). Advances in Cognitive Economics. Sofia: NBU Press.
- Dey, A., Kokinov, B., Leake, D., Turner, R. eds. (2005). Modeling and Using Context. Lecture Notes in AI, vol. 3554, Berlin: Springer Verlag.
- Kokinov, B., Hirst, W., eds. (2003). Constructive Memory. Sofia: NBU Press.
- Gentner, D., Holyoak, K., Kokinov, B., eds. (2001). The Analogical Mind: Perspectives from Cognitive Science. Cambridge, MA: MIT Press.
- Holyoak, K., Gentner, D., Kokinov, B., eds., (1998). Advances in Analogy Research: Integration of Theory and Data from the Cognitive, Computational, and Neural Sciences. Sofia: NBU Press
