= Artur Karpovich =

Belarusian politician (born 1973)

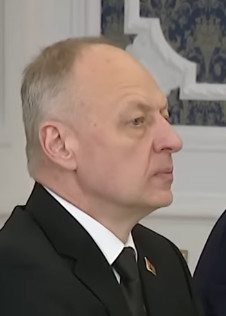
- Karpovich in 2025

Minister of Antimonopoly Regulation and Trade
- Incumbent
- Assumed office 14 January 2025
- President: Alexander Lukashenko
- Prime Minister: Roman Golovchenko; Alexander Turchin
- Preceded by: Alexey Bogdanov

Personal details
- Born: 24 July 1973 (age 53)

Artur Borisovich Karpovich (Russian: Артур Борисович Карпович; born 24 July 1973) is a Belarusian politician, who has been serving as Minister of Antimonopoly Regulation and Trade since 2025. From 2020 to 2025, he served as Advisor to the Embassy Branch Office of Belarus in Ufa, Russia.
