= Wola Krzysztoporska =

- Village
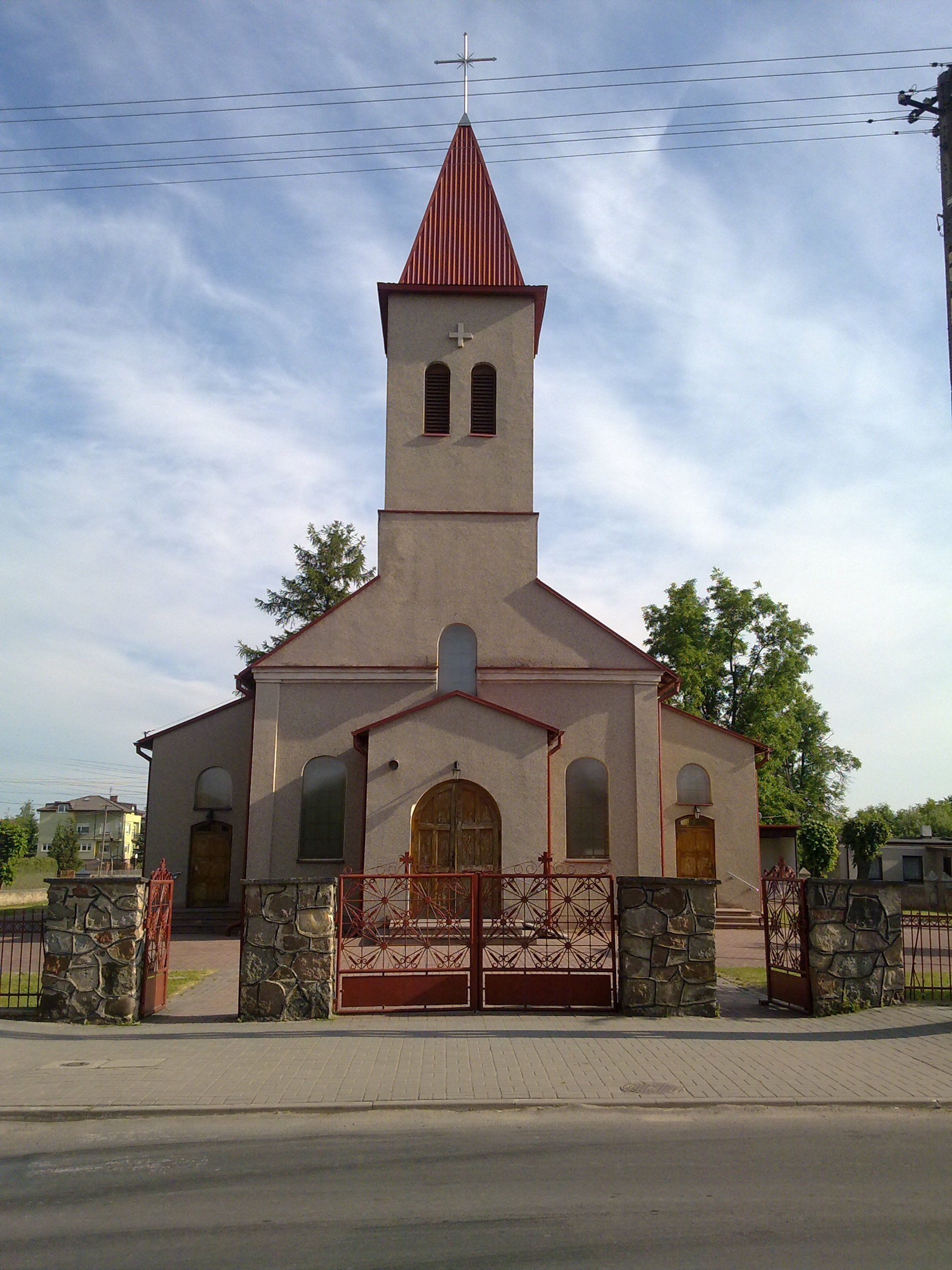
- Najświętszego Serca Pana Jezusa church

- Location within Poland
- Coordinates: 51°20′35″N 19°34′39″E
- Country: Poland
- Voivodeship: Łódź
- County: Piotrków
- Gmina: Wola Krzysztoporska
- Population: 2,100
- Website: http://wola-krzysztoporska.pl

Wola Krzysztoporska [ˈvɔla kʂɨʂtɔˈpɔrska] is a village in Piotrków County, Łódź Voivodeship, in central Poland. It is the seat of the gmina (administrative district) called Gmina Wola Krzysztoporska.
