= Parzniewiczki =

- Village
- Location within Poland
- Coordinates: 51°17′10″N 19°31′21″E
- Country: Poland
- Voivodeship: Łódź
- County: Piotrków
- Gmina: Wola Krzysztoporska

Parzniewiczki [paʐɲɛˈvit͡ʂki] is a village in the administrative district of Gmina Wola Krzysztoporska, within Piotrków County, Łódź Voivodeship, in central Poland.
