= Ludwików, Piotrków County =

Ludwików
- Village
- Location within Poland
- Coordinates: 51°19′18″N 19°33′05″E
- Country: Poland
- Voivodeship: Łódź
- County: Piotrków
- Gmina: Wola Krzysztoporska

Ludwików [ludˈvikuf] is a village in the administrative district of Gmina Wola Krzysztoporska, within Piotrków County, Łódź Voivodeship, in central Poland.
