= Georgy Fotev =

Bulgarian scientist (born 1941)

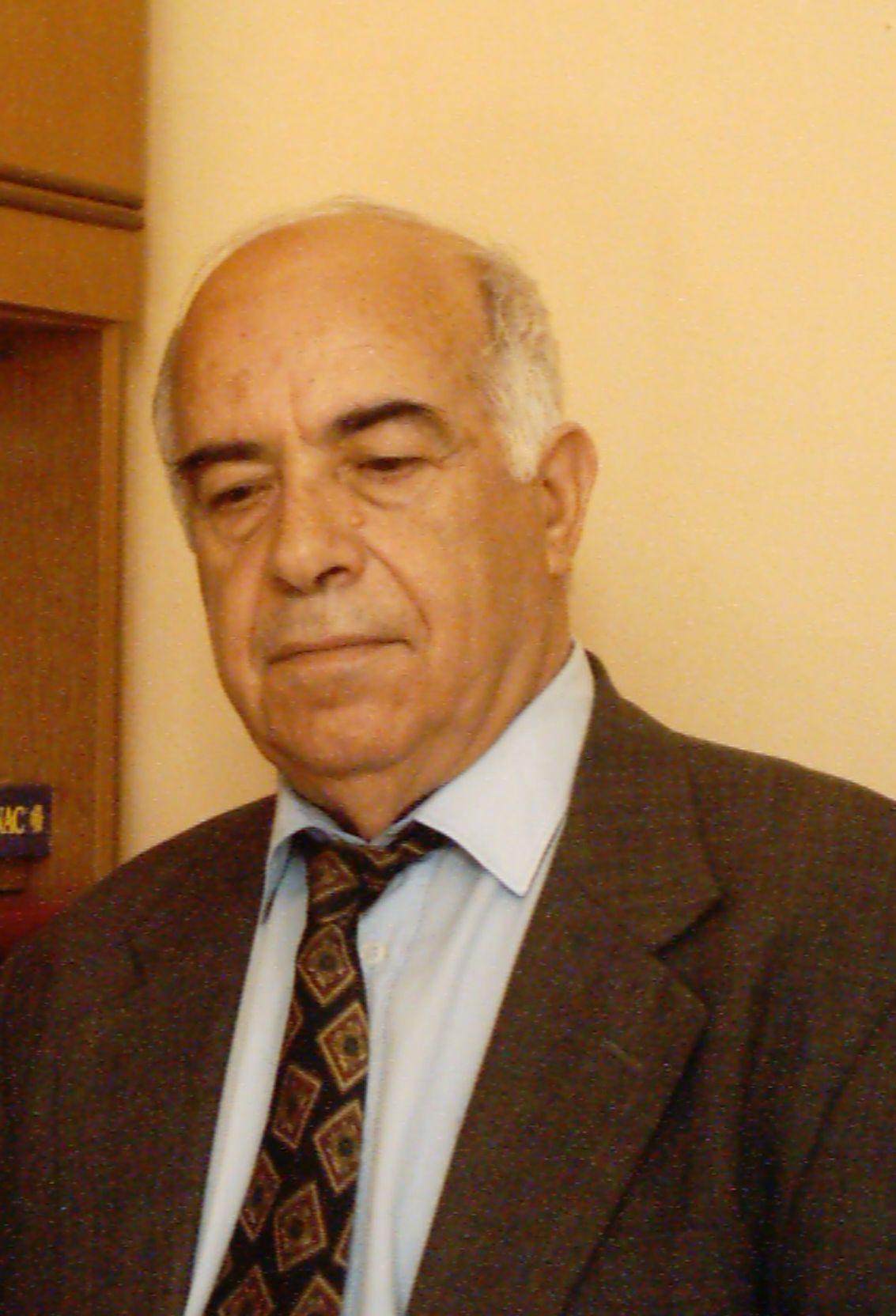
- Georgy Fotev in 2013
- Born: 24 August 1941 (age 85); Dimtrovche, Svilengrad Municipality, Bulgaria.
- Education: Sofia University "St. Kliment Ohridski" (MA)
- Scientific career
- Fields: Sociology
- Workplaces: Professor Emeritus at New Bulgarian University

Georgy Fotev (Bulgarian: Георги Фотев) (born August 24, 1941) is a Bulgarian sociologist. His scientific works are in the areas of theory and history of sociology and the disciplinary fields of modern sociology. The focus of Fotev's research interests is the nature of sociology as a multiple paradigm science. Another major theme is the dialogue as a base and horizon of multiple paradigm sociology. Georgy Fotev has publications in the fields of historical sociology, sociology of politics, ethnosociology, the crisis of legitimacy and sociology of values. His books The Long Night of Communism in Bulgaria and Bulgarian Melancholy explore the fate of the Bulgarian national society. Georgy Fotev was Minister of Education and Science (1991–1992). He is professor emeritus of New Bulgarian University, and in 2003 he was awarded the Distinguished Service Award from the American University in Bulgaria.

== Biography ==
Georgy Fotev was born on 24 August 1941 in the village of Dimitrovche, Svilengrad Municipality, Bulgaria. His life under the Communist regime was full of hardships. His father being a political emigrant in West Germany, he and his family were interned in 1950. After completing military service in the labour forces, for years he was prohibited from applying to study in any higher education institution. Repressed by the Communist regime, he was employed as a manual worker for several years. He eventually graduated in philosophy at Sofia University St. Kliment Ohridsky in 1968 but was denied the right to do academic work on political grounds for years. In 1976, he started work as a research fellow at the Institute of Sociology of the Bulgarian Academy of Sciences(BAS). In 1989 he became a professor. In 1991 he was Minister of Science and Education. In 1992–2003 he was director of the Institute of Sociology at BAS. He is also president of the Bulgarian Sociological Association and National Program Director for the European Values Study.

Georgy Fotev is the author of more than 250 scientific publications, many of them published abroad. His works have come out in more than 15 countries. The Senate of the European Academy of Sciences elected him active member in 1993, and he is also member of many other international scientific organizations.

Other positions he has held include honorary professor of New Bulgarian University (2012), where he has been a member of the board of trustees since 1994, and Fulbright scholar at Duke University in the United States (1997–1998). He was member of the Bulgarian Academy of Sciences and Arts and in 2013, he restored the Institute of Sociology at this academy. Fotev has been a member of the editorial advisory board of the journal Polish Sociological Review since 2000, as well as of the editorial boards of other academic journals. He was vice chairman of the board of directors of American University in Bulgaria from 2000 to 2003, and has been a member of the University Council of that university from 2003. Fotev is married and has a son and daughter.

== Scientific contributions ==
=== History of sociology ===
Georgy Fotev's studies in the field of history of sociology encompass the classics of sociology and the development of the Western sociological tradition from Antiquity to the end of the 20th century. His books, The Sociological Theories of E. Durkheim, A Critical Comparative Analysis and Principles of Positivist Sociology, and many of his articles and studies are devoted to classical names in sociology. In his two-volume work History of Sociology (two editions), he makes the distinction between proto-sociology and the development of sociology as a differentiated and poly-paradigmatic science.

=== Historical sociology ===
Fotev's works on historical sociology, in particular his Social Reality and Imagination. A Sociological Study on the Renaissance, hold significance for the Bulgarian sociological tradition. The concept of historical sociology rethinks the established disciplinary perspectives and status of this field within the ensemble of sociological sub-disciplines.

=== Crisis of legitimacy and civil society ===
In Fotev's view, the unfolding project of modernity is linked to periodic crises of legitimacy, which, in late modernity, create the impression of a permanent crisis. After the collapse of the totalitarian system, Fotev published the first book in Bulgaria specially devoted to the topic of civil society; in it, he explains why this concept was taboo in a totalitarian society.

=== Ethnosociology, sociology of religions ===
Georgy Fotev is the founder of the disciplines of ethnosociology and sociology of religions in Bulgaria. He has rethought fundamental concepts in these fields, such as ethnos, and has grounded an original thesis regarding the other ethnos. His contributions in this area go beyond the boundaries of Bulgarian national sociology.

=== Sociology of politics ===
In his large-scale sociological treatise Limits of Politics and in his books The Meaning of Politics and Ethnicity and Religion and Politics, he has treated of fundamental problems of politics. His studies in this field hold a major place in the author's work.

=== Dialogical sociology ===
Georgy Fotev sees dialogue as being the foundation of the poly-paradigmatic sociology, which otherwise would be doomed to constant internecine feuding due to the incommensurable elements contained in the various sociological paradigms. The author refers to a dialogical reason that can be an alternative and opposition to the century-long domination of monological reason. As a concept, Fotev argues that dialogue is something more than conversation, discussion or debate.

=== Disciplinary structure of sociology ===
In contrast with certain influential views regarding the chaos of scientific disciplines, the end of disciplinary knowledge, and methodological anarchy, Georgy Fotev proposes the thesis that scientific cognition would be impossible outside a certain disciplinary framework, which, however, must be different from the framework of monodisciplinary sciences, respectively, of sociology as a monodisciplinary science. There also exist interdisciplinary, multidisciplinary, and transdisciplinary sciences.[13]

=== The Long Night of Communism ===
In his monographical work The Long Night of Communism in Bulgaria and other publications, Fotev has studied the formation, functioning and implosion of the totalitarian Communist system. As the author puts it, these analyses resemble a surrealistic sociology of a Utopia.

=== Bulgarian Melancholy ===
The eponymous book is a large-scale attempt at sociological characterization of the Bulgarian national community in the age of modernization in which Fotev views melancholy in the perspective of phenomenological sociology.

=== Axiology and sociology of values ===
In Fotev's works devoted to sociology of values and axiology, he has elaborated a complex theory of values, including the distinction between value, fact, and norm, the crisis of values, the revaluation of values and the values functioning in present-day Bulgarian society.

== Publications ==
=== Monographic works ===
- Социологическите теории на Е. Дюркем, В. Парето, М. Вебер. София: Наука и изкуство, 1979, 270 с. [The Sociological Theories of E. Durkheim, M. Weber, and V. Pareto. A Critical Comparative Analysis. Sofia: Nauka i izkustvo, 1979, 270 p. (in Bulgarian)]
- Принципите на позитивистката социология. София: Българска академия на науките, 1982, 260 с. [Principles of Positivist Sociology. Sofia: BAS Pbls., 1982, 260 p. (in Bulgarian)]
- Социална реалност и въображение. София: Наука и изкуство, 1986, 261 с. (1996 – на гръцки език, 1996 – второ издание, Стара Загора: Идея) [Social Reality and Imagination. Sofia: Nauka i izkustvo, 1986, 261 p. (in Bulgarian) (1996 – published in Greek, 1996 – second edition in Bulgarian, Stara Zagora: Idea Pbls.)]
- Гражданското общество. 1992 (1996 – на гръцки език) [Civil Society. 1992 (in Bulgarian) (1996 – published in Greek)]
- История на социологията. т.1, София: Унив. изд. „Св.Климент Охридски“, 1993, 404 с. (2 изд., София: Книгоиздателска къща „Труд“, 2002, 373 с.) [History of Sociology. Vol. 1, Sofia: University Pbls. St. Kliment Ohridsky, 1993, 404 p. (2nd edition, Sofia: Trud Publishing House, 2002, 373 p.) (in Bulgarian)];
- История на социологията. т.2, София: Унив. изд. „Св. Климент Охридски“, 1993, 685 с. (2 изд., София: Книгоиздателска къща „Труд”, 2002, 615 с.) [History of Sociology. Vol. 2, Sofia: University Pbls. St. Kliment Ohridsky, 1993, 685 p. (2nd edition, Sofia: Trud Publishing House, 2002, 615 p.) (in Bulgarian)];
- Другият етнос. София: Изд. „Марин Дринов“, 1994, 223 с. [The Other Ethnos. Sofia: 2010 Marin Drinov Pbls., 1994, 223 p. (in Bulgarian)];
- Криза на легитимността. София: Университетско издателство „Св. Климент Охридски“, 1999, 315 с. [Crisis of Legitimacy. Sofia: 2010 University Publishers St. Kliment Ohridsky, 1999, 315 p. (in Bulgarian)];
- Смисъл на политиката. София: Акад. изд. „Проф. Марин Дринов“, 1999, 150 с. [The Meaning of Politics, Sofia: Prof. Marin Drinov Pbls., 1999, 150 p. (in Bulgarian)];
- Ethnicity, Religion, and Politics. Essays on Multidimentional Transition. Sofia: Academic Publishing House „Marin Drinov“, 1999, 151 р.
- Граници на политиката. София: ЛиК, 2001, 428 с. [18] [Limits of Politics, Sofia: LiK, 2001, 428 p. (in Bulgarian)];
- Диалогична социология. София: Изток–Запад, 2004, 1097 с. [19] [20] [Dialogical Sociology, Sofia: Iztok-Zapad Pbl., 2004, XV, 1097 p. (in Bulgarian)]
- Дългата нощ на комунизма в България. София: Изток-Запад, 2008, 472 с. [21] [The Long Night of Communism in Bulgaria. Sofia: Iztok-Zad Pbls., 2008, 471 p. (in Bulgarian)];
- Ценности срещу безпорядък. София: Изток-Запад, 2009, 230 с. [Values against Disorder. Sofia: Iztok-Zad Pbls., 2009, 209 p. (in Bulgarian)]
- Българската меланхолия. София: Изток-Запад, 2010, 464 с. [The Bulgarian Melancholy (Bulgarian Melancholy). Sofia: 2010 Iztok-Zapad Publishing House, 2010, 461 p. (in Bulgarian)];
- Сфери на ценностите София: Нов български университет, 2012, 328 с.[22] [Spheres of Values, Sofia: New Bulgarian University, 2012, 328 p. (in Bulgarian)];

=== As compiler and editor ===
- Антология на българската социологическа мисъл. Т.3, (Съставил в съавторство), София: Наука и изкуство, 1985, с. 752. [Anthology of Bulgarian Sociological Thought. Vol. 3 (editor and co-author), Sofia: Nauka i izkustvo, 1985, 752 p. (in Bulgarian)]
- Society and Social Change (ed.), Sofia: Svyat, 1986, 352 p.
- Социална ефективност на емпиричните социологически изследвания. (Съставител в съавторство), София: Наука и изкуство, 1988, 332 с. [Social Effectiveness of Empirical Sociological Studies. (editor and co-author), Sofia: Nauka i izkustvo, 1988, 332 p. (in Bulgarian)]
- Социологически перспективи и критика. (Съставител в съавторство), София: Българска академия на науките, 1989, 272 с. [Sociological Perspectives and Critique (editor and co-author), Sofia: Bulgarian Academy of Sciences, 1989, 272 p. (in Bulgarian)]
- Research Dimensions of Bulgarian Sociology Today (ed.), Sofia: Svyat, 1990, 271 p.
- Етническият конфликт в България. (Съставител в съавторство), София: Профиздат, 1989, 344 с. [Ethnic Conflict in Bulgaria (editor and co-author), Sofia: Profizdat, 1989, 344 p. (in Bulgarian)]
- Извори на социологията. Антология. Стара Загора: Издателство "Идея", 1998, 808 с. [Sources for Sociology. Anthology (ed.) Stara Zagora: Idea Publishers, 1998, 808 p. (in Bulgarian)]
- Социално разслояване в България и Република Македония. Съставит. Георги Фотев, Jорде Jакимовски. София: ЛИК, 1998, 116 с. [Social Stratificaition in Bulgaria and the Republic of Macedonia. Georgy Fotev, Yorde Yakimovski (eds.) Sofia: LiK, 1998, 116 p. (in Bulgarian)]
- Съседството на религиозните общности в България (съставител). София: Институт по социология при БАН, 2000, 270 с. [Neighbourhood of Religious Communities in Bulgaria (ed.), Sofia: Institute of Sociology at BAS, 2000, 270 p. (in Bulgarian)]
- Гражданите и местната власт. БСЧИГП, София (в съавторство), 1995, 120 с. [Citizens and Local Government. BSHECR, Sofia (as co-author), 1995, 120 p. (in Bulgarian)];
- Bulgarian Rural Women Today (ed.). Sofia: LiK Publishers, 2001, 151 pp.
- Mutations de société et quête de sens. (Jacques L. Boucher, Guéorgui Fotev, Svetla Koleva). Sofia: Les Editions LiK, 2001, 287 pp.
- Военна социология в България през първата половина на ХХ век. Антология (съставител). София: Военно издателство, 2004. [Military Sociology in Bulgaria in the First Half of the 20th Century. Anthology (ed.) Sofia: Voenno izdatelstvo, 2004 (in Bulgarian)]
- Социология на отклоняващото се поведение (съставител). София: Просвета, 2005, 544 с. [Sociology of Deviant Behaviour (ed.) Sofia: Prosveta, 2005, 544 p. (in Bulgarian)]
- Европейските ценности в днешното българско общество (съставител). София: УИ „Св.Климент Охридски”, 2010, 282 с. [European Values in Bulgarian Society Today (ed.). Sofia: University Publishers St. Kliment Ohridsky 2010 282 p. (in Bulgarian)]
