= Budków, Piotrków County =

Budków
- Village
- Location within Poland
- Coordinates: 51°25′4″N 19°29′51″E
- Country: Poland
- Voivodeship: Łódź
- County: Piotrków
- Gmina: Wola Krzysztoporska
- Population: 70

Budków [ˈbutkuf] is a village in the administrative district of Gmina Wola Krzysztoporska, within Piotrków County, Łódź Voivodeship, in central Poland.
