= Dąbrówka, Gmina Wola Krzysztoporska =

Village in Gmina Wola Krzysztoporska, Poland

Dąbrówka
- Village
- Location within Poland
- Coordinates: 51°24′49″N 19°35′11″E
- Country: Poland
- Voivodeship: Łódź
- County: Piotrków
- Gmina: Wola Krzysztoporska

Dąbrówka [dɔmˈbrufka] is a village in the administrative district of Gmina Wola Krzysztoporska, within Piotrków County, Łódź Voivodeship, in central Poland.
