= Glina, Piotrków County =

Glina
- Village
- Location within Poland
- Coordinates: 51°21′35″N 19°39′45″E
- Country: Poland
- Voivodeship: Łódź
- County: Piotrków
- Gmina: Wola Krzysztoporska

Glina [ˈɡlina] is a village in the administrative district of Gmina Wola Krzysztoporska, within Piotrków County, Łódź Voivodeship, in central Poland.
