= Gmina Wola Krzysztoporska =

Gmina Wola Krzysztoporska Wola Krzysztoporska Commune
- Gmina
- Flag Coat of arms
- Interactive map of Gmina Wola Krzysztoporska
- Coordinates (Wola Krzysztoporska): 51°20′35″N 19°34′39″E
- Country: Poland
- Voivodeship: Łódź
- County: Piotrków County
- Seat: Wola Krzysztoporska

Area
  - Total: 170.41 km^{2} (65.80 sq mi)

Population (2006)
  - Total: 11,575
  - Density: 67.924/km^{2} (175.92/sq mi)
- Website: http://www.wola-krzysztoporska.pl

Gmina Wola Krzysztoporska is a rural gmina (administrative district) in Piotrków County, Łódź Voivodeship, in central Poland. Its seat is the village of Wola Krzysztoporska, which lies approximately 10 kilometres (6 mi) south-west of Piotrków Trybunalski and 50 km (31 mi) south of the regional capital Łódź.

The gmina covers an area of 170.41 square kilometres (65.8 sq mi), and as of 2006 its total population is 11,575.

== Villages ==
Gmina Wola Krzysztoporska contains the villages and settlements of Blizin, Bogdanów, Bogdanów-Kolonia, Borowa, Budków, Bujny, Dąbrówka, Gąski, Glina, Gomulin, Gomulin-Kolonia, Jeżów, Kacprów, Kamienna, Kargał-Las, Kozierogi, Krężna, Krężna-Kolonia, Krzyżanów, Laski, Ludwików, Majków Duży, Mąkolice, Mąkolice-Kolonia, Miłaków, Moników, Mzurki, Oprzężów, Oprzężów-Kolonia, Parzniewice Duże, Parzniewice Małe, Parzniewiczki, Pawłów Dolny, Pawłów Górny, Piaski, Piekarki, Piekary, Poraj, Praca, Radziątków, Rokszyce, Rokszyce Szkolne, Siomki, Stradzew, Wola Krzysztoporska, Wola Rokszycka, Woźniki, Woźniki-Kolonia, Wygoda and Żachta.

== Neighbouring gminas ==
Gmina Wola Krzysztoporska is bordered by the city of Piotrków Trybunalski and by the gminas of Bełchatów, Drużbice, Grabica, Kamieńsk and Rozprza.
