= Bogdanów, Łódź Voivodeship =

Bogdanów
- Village
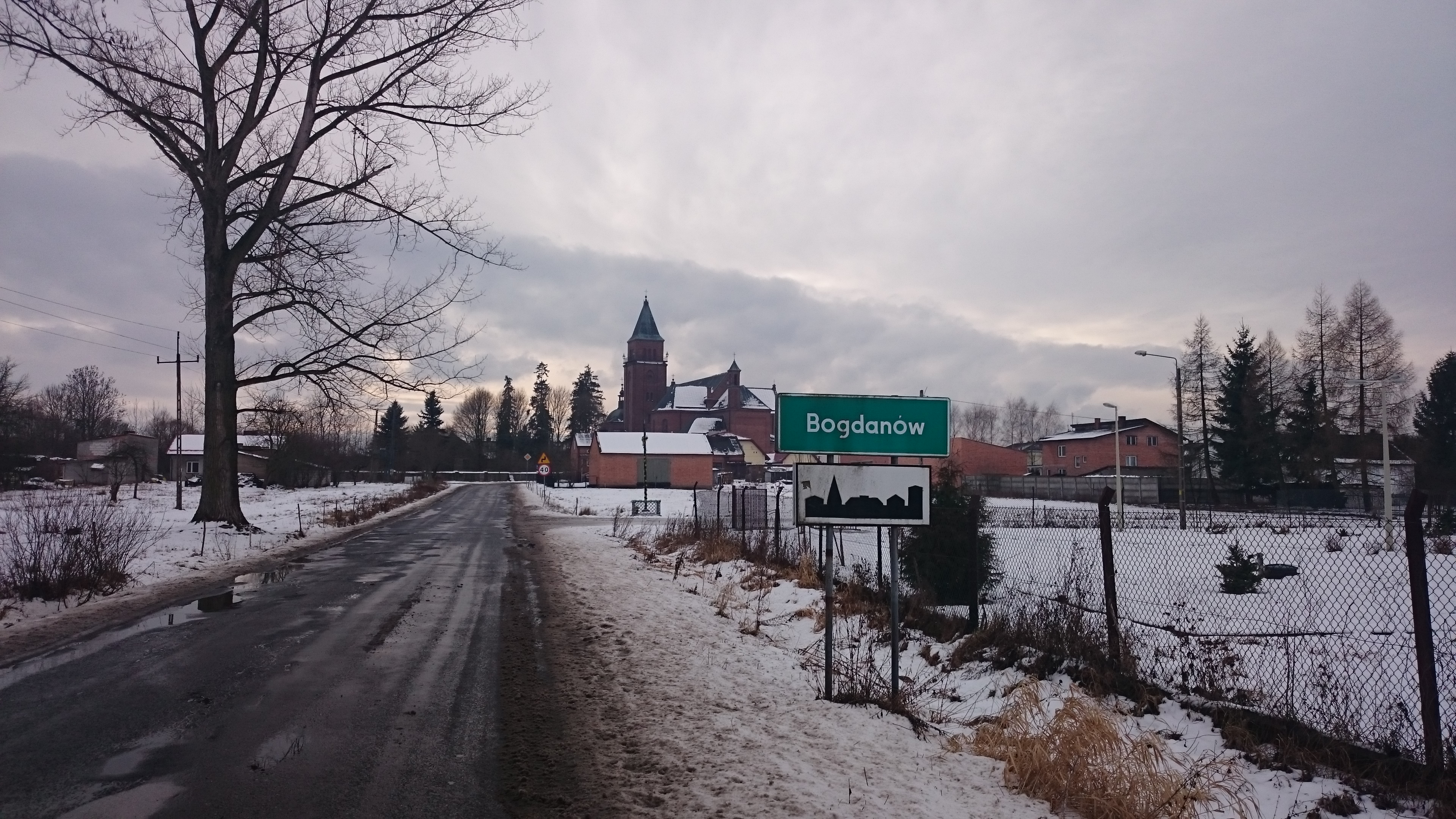

- Location within Poland
- Coordinates: 51°21′N 19°30′E
- Country: Poland
- Voivodeship: Łódź
- County: Piotrków
- Gmina: Wola Krzysztoporska
- Population: 290

Bogdanów [bɔɡˈdanuf] is a village in the administrative district of Gmina Wola Krzysztoporska, within Piotrków County, Łódź Voivodeship, in central Poland.

The village has a population of 290.
