= Praca, Łódź Voivodeship =

Praca
- Village
- Location within Poland
- Coordinates: 51°25′N 19°34′E
- Country: Poland
- Voivodeship: Łódź
- County: Piotrków
- Gmina: Wola Krzysztoporska
- Population (approx.): 160

Praca [ˈprat͡sa] is a village in the administrative district of Gmina Wola Krzysztoporska, within Piotrków County, Łódź Voivodeship, in central Poland.

The village has an approximate population of 160.
