= Dimitrovche =

- Village
- Location within Bulgaria
- Coordinates: 41°49′N 26°15′E
- Country: Bulgaria
- Province: Haskovo Province
- Municipality: Svilengrad
- Time zone: UTC+2 (EET)
  - Summer (DST): UTC+3 (EEST)

== Overview ==
Dimitrovche is a village in the municipality of Svilengrad, in Haskovo Province, in southern Bulgaria.

== Geography ==
Dimitrovche is located in the Upper Thracian Plain near the border triangle where Bulgaria, Greece, and Turkey meet. The village is situated approximately 6 to 7 kilometers southwest of the municipal center of Svilengrad, 14 kilometers southeast of Lyubimets, and 58 kilometers southeast of the regional capital of Haskovo. The Levka River flows directly through the settlement. Along with the neighboring village of Shtit, which lies further to the northeast along the Sakar mountain foothills, Dimitrovche belongs to a cluster of agrarian frontier settlements situated within the immediate border zone of the municipality.

== History ==
During the Ottoman rule of the Balkan Peninsula, the settlement was known by its Ottoman Turkish name, Dimitri Köy" (also rendered in Bulgarian phonetics as ''Димитри кьой''). Following the First Balkan War (1912-1913), the territory was integrated into the Kingdom of Bulgaria.
