= Lyubomir Bogdanov =

Bulgarian footballer

Personal information
- Date of birth: 21 December 1982 (age 43)
- Place of birth: Bulgaria
- Height: 1.71 m (5 ft 7 in)
- Position: Midfielder

Senior career*
Years	Team	Apps	(Gls)
2006–2007	Chmel Blšany		
2007–2008	Baník Most	27	(1)
2008–2009	Minyor Pernik		
- * Club domestic league appearances and goals

Lyubomir Bogdanov (born 21 December 1982) is a Bulgarian former football midfielder.

Bogdanov played for Baník Most in the Czech First League before joining Minyor for the 2008–09 A PFG season.
