= Gąski, Łódź Voivodeship =

Gąski
- Village
- Location within Poland
- Coordinates: 51°22′N 19°37′E
- Country: Poland
- Voivodeship: Łódź
- County: Piotrków
- Gmina: Wola Krzysztoporska

Gąski [ˈɡɔ̃ski] is a village in the administrative district of Gmina Wola Krzysztoporska, within Piotrków County, Łódź Voivodeship, in central Poland.
