= Konstantin Bogdanov =

Russian anthropologist and philologist (1963–2026)

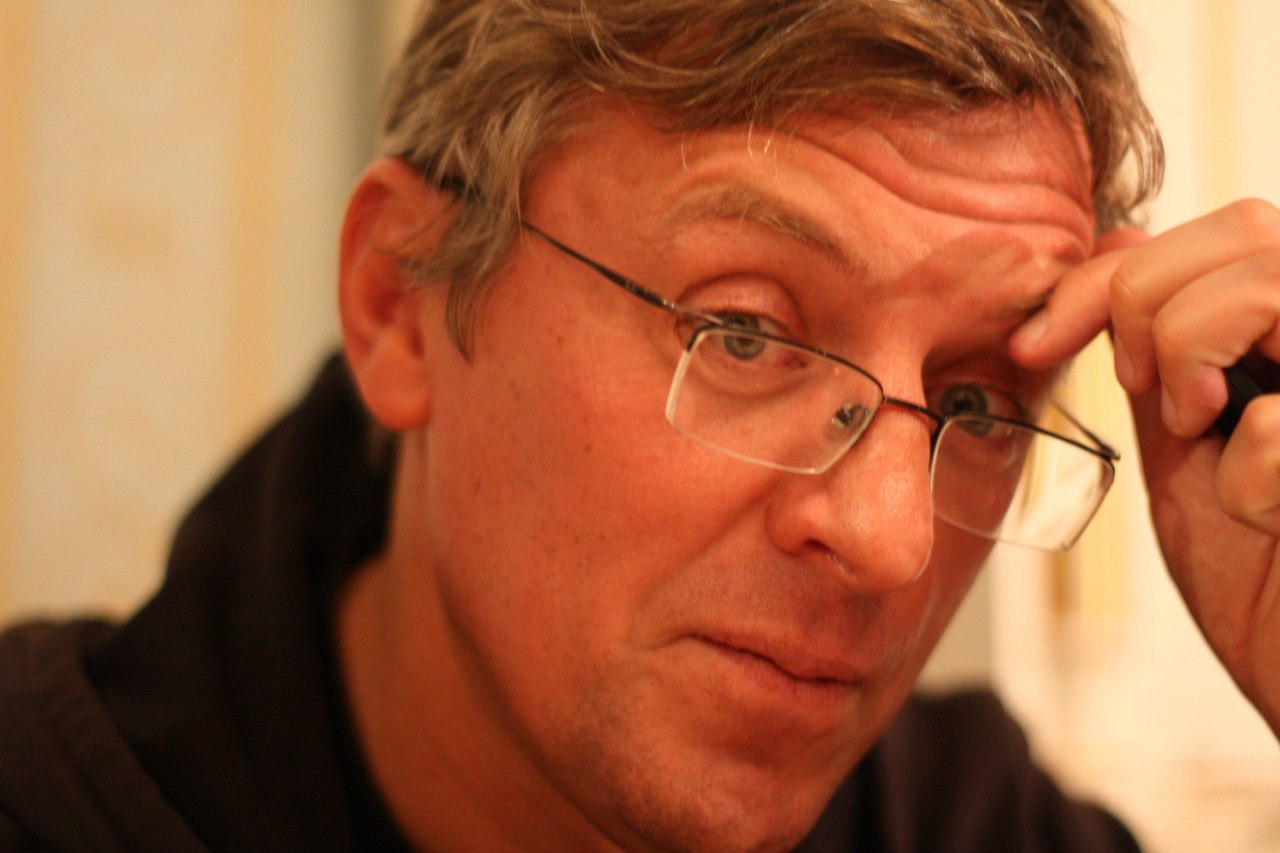
Bogdanov in 2014

Konstantin Anatolevich Bogdanov (Russian: Константин Анатольевич Богданов; 30 March 1963 – 21 February 2026) was a Russian anthropologist and philologist whose areas of investigation covered Russian culture, including folklore, rhetoric, and the history of science and humanities. He also researched the history of social thought in 18th–20th-century Russia.

== Early life and education ==
Konstantin Bogdanov was born on 30 March 1963 in Leningrad, USSR (later Saint Petersburg, Russia). He obtained his undergraduate degree in classical philology and Russian language and literature at Saint Petersburg State University. Bogdanov became a member of the Russian Academy of Sciences.

In 1992, Bogdanov completed his PhD with the dissertation: “Magic Spelling in Russian Folklore: A Structural Analysis". The same year, he became a leading researcher for the Institute of Russian Literature of the Russian Academy of Sciences. From 1994 to 1995, Bogdanov was a senior lecturer for the State University of Trade Unions for the Humanities in Saint Petersburg. During this time, he obtained a grant from the Kennan Institute for Advanced Russian Studies and produced an investigation of social thought in 19th-century Russia. Bogdanov continued his post-doctoral work with the Russian Academy of Sciences in 1998. He produced another dissertation, "Russian Folklore; Semiotics of Reality” in 2002.

== Teaching ==
Bogdanov taught various Russian university courses on Greco-Roman Culture, Russian literature of 18th and 20th century, survey courses on Russian culture (from the 17th century to the mid-20th century). During his long association with the University of Konstanz in Germany, he also taught courses in Russian literature and culture over the entire range of Russian history in English and in Russian. He also had experience in teaching Greek, Latin, and Russian language courses (beginning, intermediate and advanced levels). His major scholarly interests were focused on historical and theoretical aspects of 18th–20th-century Russian literature and culture. His main area of investigation was still Russian Literature and Folklore, History of Social Thought, History of Russian and European Rhetoric, Cultural History of Russian and Soviet Humanities.

== Professional activities ==
From 1992, Bogdanov was a Leading Researcher at the Institute of Russian Literature (the Pushkin House) at the Russian Academy of Sciences in Saint Petersburg, Russia. From 2001, he was a visiting professor (Privatdozent) at the Department of Slavic Studies at the University of Konstanz. From 2001 to 2003, he had a research project "History of Translation and Adaptation of European Rhetoric in 17th–18th-Century Russia" (German: Rhetorische Begriffsbildung als Adaptations- und Übersetzungsprozess im ostslavischen Raum des 17. und 18. Jahrhunderts), which was supported by Thyssen Stiftung. After that, he had a two-year research project on Soviet sciences in the 1920s and 1930s, funded by the German Research Foundation (DFG) (German: Zur Entstehung der sowjetischen Wissenschaften in den 1920er und -30er Jahren. Deutsche Forschungsgemeinschaft. In 2007, he started a new research project supported by DFG about the history of mathematics and humanities in the Soviet Union (German: Ziffer und Buchstabe. Diskursive, ideologische und mediale Transformationen in den sowjetischen Humanwissenschaften der 1950er und 60er Jahre).

Bogdanov was an active organizer of professional conferences, most notably being active in the annual conference on “Mythology and Day-to-day Life” by the Russian Academy of Sciences in Saint Petersburg.

== Death ==
Bogdanov died on 21 February 2026, at the age of 62.

== Monographs ==
1. Vox Populi. The Folklore Genres of Soviet Culture. Novoe literaturnoe obozrenie. Moscow. 2009.
2. Crocodiles in Russia. A History of Exoticism and Loan Words. Moscow: NLO, 2006. 352 pp.

Rec.: Andrew Khan, in: Anthropological Forum, Nr. 8, 2008; Andrei Martynov in : NG ex libris, 21 September 1006; S.D. in: Literatura, Nr. 09, 2006. Sergey Prokhorov in: Nevskoye Vremya, 24.05.06; Sergey Shpalov in: Kultura, Nr. 21, 1-7.07.06; Olga Kadikina in: Krug Chteniya, 30.05.06; Vsevolod Brodsky in: Expert On-line: http://www.expert.ru/printissues/expert/2006/19/book_reptiliiya.

1. Physicians, Patients, Readers: Pathographical Texts of Russian Culture of 18 -19th Centuries. Moscow: OGI, 2005, 520 pp.

Rec.: Andrei Topotrkov in: NLO, Nr. 85, 2007; Zakharine, Dmitri in: Anthropological Forum, Nr. 6, 2006, P. 381-386; Anna Kusnecova in: Znamya, Nr. 11, 2005.

1. Everyday Life and Mythology: Studies on Semiotics of Folklore Reality. St. Petersburg: Iskusstvo, 2001, 438 pp.
2. Aratus. Phaenomena. Ancient Greek Text with Russian Translation, Introduction and line-by-line Commentary. St. Petersburg: Aleteia, 2000, 252 pp.
3. Homo Tacens. Anthropology of Silence. St. Petersburg: Russian Christian Institute for the Humanities Press, 1998, 354 pp.
4. Money in Russian Folklore, St. Petersburg: Bell, 1995, 125 pp.

The full publication list is on the Homepage University of Contance:https://web.archive.org/web/20110604214934/http://www.uni-konstanz.de/FuF/Philo/LitWiss/Slavistik/Bogdanov/Bibliographie.html
