= Modest Bogdanov =

Russian zoologist (1841–1888)

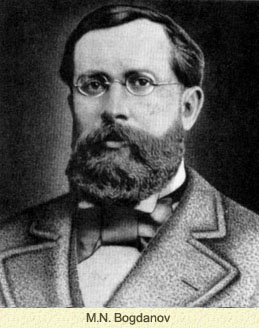

Modest Nikolaevich Bogdanov (7 September 1841 – 16 March 1888) was a Russian zoologist, explorer, and a writer of children's books. He also took a special interest in domesticated animals including dogs and poultry.

Bogdanov was born in Bekshanka in Simbirsk. Growing up in the countryside, he studied at the Simbirsk Gymnasium before graduating from Kazan University in 1864. He was influenced by professors A.M. Butlerov, M.A. Kowalski, and E.A. Eversmann. He travelled from Kazan to Astrakhan between 1868 and 1870 and received a master's degree from St. Petersburg University. He then became a professor and keeper of the Zoological Museum, 1871. He went on a collecting expedition of the Kazan Society of Naturalists to the Caucasus. In 1873 he explored the Khiva oasis. In 1881 he wrote a doctoral dissertation on the Shrikes of Russia.

He retired from the Museum in 1885 due to poor health and he moved to warmer climates, Tiflis, and Sukhum-Kale. He wrote many articles for children on animals.
