= Poraj, Łódź Voivodeship =

Poraj
- Village
- Location within Poland
- Coordinates: 51°17′N 19°32′E
- Country: Poland
- Voivodeship: Łódź
- County: Piotrków
- Gmina: Wola Krzysztoporska
- Population: 90

Poraj [ˈpɔrai̯] is a village in the administrative district of Gmina Wola Krzysztoporska, within Piotrków County, Łódź Voivodeship, in central Poland.
