= Rakitina Nika =

Belarusian writer (b. 1963)

Rakitina Nika (pen name of Ludmila Bogdanova) (born in 1963) is a science fiction and fantasy writer from Gomel, Belarus.

She received the ESFS encouragement award (Belarus) at Eurocon-2008.

== Bibliography ==
- 2008. "Gonitwa" (novel)
