= Theodora Dimova =

Bulgarian writer and playwright

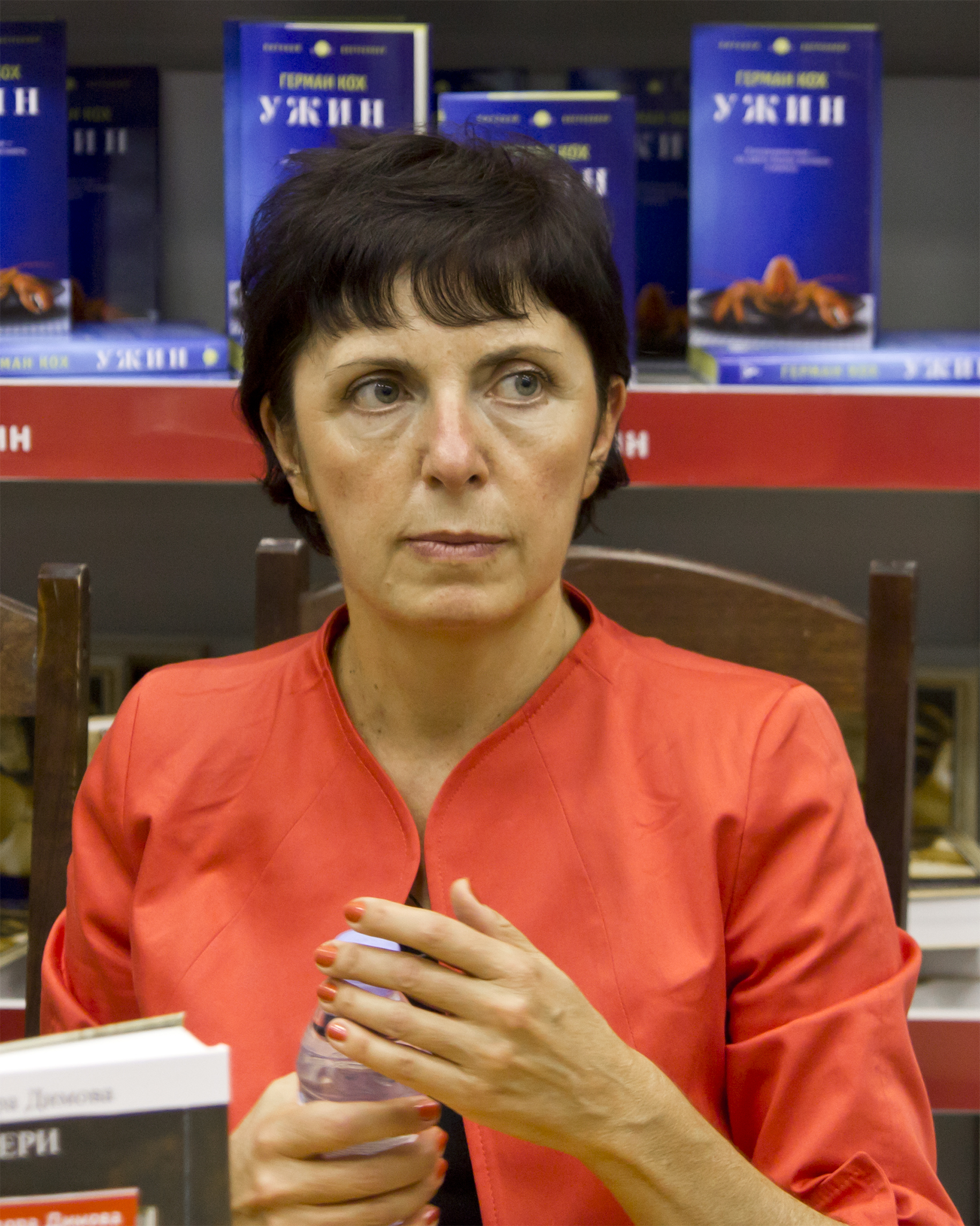

Theodora Dimova (Bulgarian: Теодора Димова) (born 19 September 1960 in Sofia, Bulgaria) is a Bulgarian writer and playwright. She graduated in English Language Studies from the Sofia University "St. Kliment Ohridski" and has studied at the Royal Court Theatre in London. She has won many literary awards. Theodora Dimova is a daughter of the famous Bulgarian writer Dimitar Dimov.

== Books ==
Novels

- Emine (2001)
- Maikite (2005)
- Adriana (2007)
- Marma, Mariam (2010)
- Vlakyt za Emaus (2013)
- Porazenite (2019)
- Ne Vi Poznavam (2023)

Plays

- Fyuri
- Staya № 48
- Erikapayos
- Calvados, priyatelyu
- Igrila
- Platoto
- Neda i Kuchetata
- Elin
- Stoper
- Zamakat Ireloh
- Bez Kozha
- Zmiysko Mlyako
- Kuchkata
- Lyubovnitsi
