= Valery Bogdanov (footballer, born 1966) =

Russian footballer

Personal information
- Full name: Valery Vladimirovich Bogdanov
- Date of birth: 9 June 1966
- Place of birth: Vladivostok, Soviet Union
- Date of death: 15 June 2010 (aged 44)
- Height: 1.78 m (5 ft 10 in)
- Position: Midfielder

Senior career*
Years	Team	Apps	(Gls)
1982	FC Luch-Energiya Vladivostok (amateur)		
1984–1985	FC Luch Vladivostok	37	(0)
1988–1995	FC Luch Vladivostok	201	(15)
1996	Dalian Shunfa		
1997	FC Luch Vladivostok	15	(0)
1998	FC Okean Nakhodka	13	(4)
1999	FC Lokomotiv Ussuriysk (amateur)		
- * Club domestic league appearances and goals

Valery Vladimirovich Bogdanov (Russian: Валерий Владимирович Богданов; born 9 June 1966; died 15 June 2010) was a Russian football player.
