= Alexey Bogdanov =

Belarusian politician (born 1973)

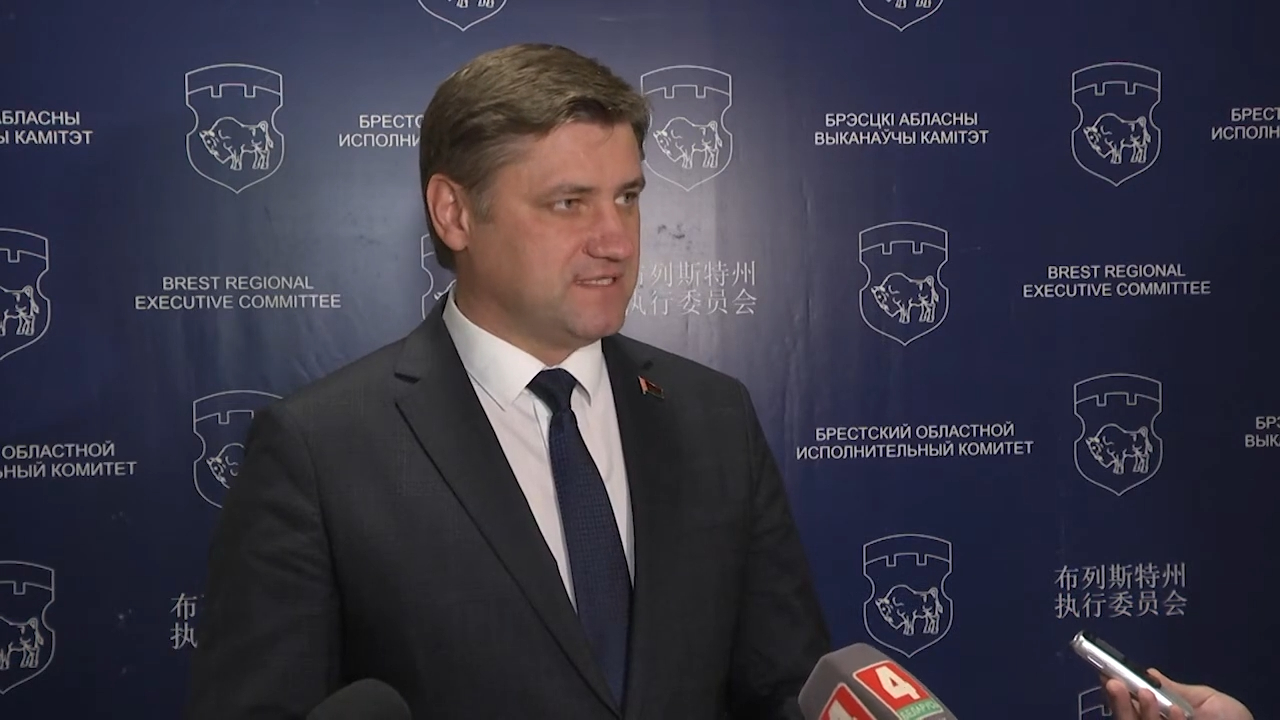
- Bogdanov in 2022

Minister of Antimonopoly Regulation and Trade
- In office 21 December 2021 – 14 January 2025
- President: Alexander Lukashenko
- Prime Minister: Roman Golovchenko
- Preceded by: Vladimir Koltovich
- Succeeded by: Artur Karpovich

Personal details
- Born: 27 January 1973 (age 53)

Alexey Igorevich Bogdanov (Russian: Алексей Игоревич Богданов; born 27 January 1973) is a Belarusian politician serving as ambassador to Kazakhstan since 2025. From 2021 to 2025, he served as minister of antimonopoly regulation and trade.
