= Alexei Alexeivich Bogdanov =

Soviet geologist

Alexei Alexeivich Bogdanov (Russian: Алексей Алексеевич Богданов; 25 February 1907 – 18 September 1971) was a Soviet geologist and specialist on tectonics. After producing a tectonic map of the USSR, he began a collaboration to produce a tectonic map of Europe which was produced in sixteen sheets in 1964. A son, also named Alexei (born 1935), became a noted molecular biologist. The mineral Bogdanovite is named in his honour.

Bogdanov was born in Sukhumi and grew up in Geneva, where his family moved. His mother, Tatiana Gennadievna Kartsova, was a bacteriologist who worked at the Pasteur Institut and the University of Geneva. She also served on the Serbian front during World War I and died of typhus in 1919. His father was educated at the University of Geneva and worked in the oil industry in Russia from 1916. Bogdanov went to school in Yaroslavl and went to the Moscow Academy of Mines in 1925. He received a candidate degree in 1941 and a doctorate in 1945. During his studies he went on several expeditions during summers working with A.D. Arkhangelskii and N.S. Shatskii. These were mainly for the exploration of oil and gas reserves but also involved examining structure and stratigraphy. He took an interest in the salt domes of the Caspian region. He taught at the Moscow Geological Prospecting Institute from 1935 and became a professor in 1946. He moved to Moscow State University in 1951. In 1956, he presented a tectonic map at the scale of 1:4000000 of the USSR, a project which was begun by Nikolai Sergeevich Shatskii (1895–1960), at the International Geological Congress and led to the creation of a project to produce a tectonic map of the world. In 1964, the collaboration helped produce a map of the European region which was published in 1964.

He died from a ruptured aorta while working in Kazakhstan. Bogdanov was the recipient of the Leopold von Buch medal of Göttingen University and a gold medal from Charles University in Prague.
