= Regensburg subcamp =

Subcamp of Flossenbürg concentration camp (Germany)

Coordinates: 49.0248361°N 12.0970996°E

The Regensburg satellite camp (KZ-Außenlager Regensburg) (Stadtamhof, Regensburg, Bavaria, Germany), also known as the Colosseum subcamp (Außenkommando Colosseum) in the vernacular at the time, was established in 1945 as the last subcamp of the Flossenbürg concentration camp in the Regensburg inn the Kolosseum (originally spelled with K). The Regensburg subcamp was in operation from March 19, 1945, until April 23, 1945. The Colosseum building is located at Stadtamhof 5, approximately 200 meters north of the Danube across the Stone Bridge (Steinerne Brücke) from the Altstadt (old town).

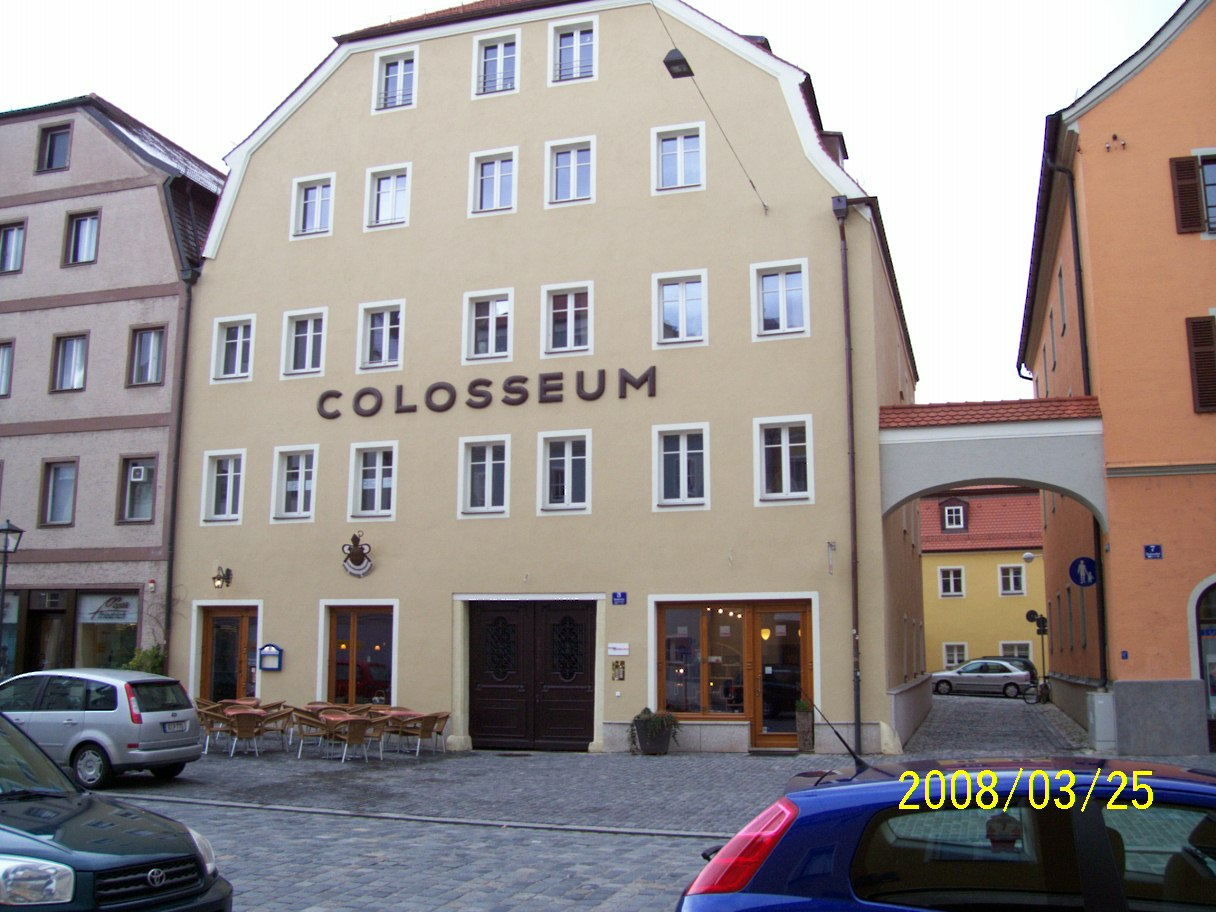
The Colosseum (2008), former Regensburg subcamp of Flossenbürg

== History ==
In 1928, the owner of the Regensburg Carmelite Brewery Hotel (Dachauplatz 1) refused to rent out meeting halls to the NSDAP (National Socialist German Workers' Party, aka the Nazi Party) for NSDAP party events because of complaints from Jewish and other hotel guests. The Augustinian Brewery and the Obermünster Brewery (Obermünsterstrasse 10) also joined in the refusal to rent out halls. The city's magistrate also refused to rent out the Neuhaus Hall in the Regensburg City Theater (Bismarckplatz 7). (Note: See also: Theater Regensburg.) The magistrate had demanded that signs reading “Jews not allowed to enter” be removed from the posters, but the NSDAP refused to comply. Local NSDAP leaders blamed the Jews, and urged retaliation by calling for a boycott of Jewish shops and the aforementioned restaurants. The NSDAP evaded the refusal to rent out halls, and held their meetings in the restaurants of the Kolosseum and Zur Glocke.

From March 19, 1945, to April 23, 1945, a temporary satellite camp was set up in the Colosseum inn, located in the Stadtamhof district of Regensburg, where around 400 male concentration camp prisoners were forced to repair bomb damage to the railroads (clear debris, fill bomb craters, lay new tracks, etc.) caused by frequent Allied bombing runs. (Note: Clearing and repairing the tracks could no longer be done by "employees" as forced laborers, and everywhere there was a labor shortage due to the war. Finally, the Reichsbahn (German National Railway) called in prisoners from the Flossenbürg concentration camp to ensure the continuation of rail transport.) The work assignments were mainly at the Regensburg Hauptbahnhof (main railway station) and adjacent railway facilities. Among the prisoners were 128 Jews (including 67 Poles and 42 Hungarians), 84 non-Jewish Poles, 63 Russians, 62 Belgians, 25 French, 22 Germans, and the remainder consisted of ten other nationalities. The prisoners were transferred from the Flossenbürg main camp, but by the time they were taken to the Regensburg satellite camp, most of them had already suffered long torturous journeys through various camps, including Auschwitz, Buchenwald, Gross-Rosen, and their various subcamps. (Note: Some of the prisoners, after initial selection for labor at Auschwitz, had been in the Project Riese group of subcamps of Gross-Rosen located in the Owl Mountains in Lower Silesia, before being transferred to Flossenbürg in February 1945.)

At night the prisoners were housed in the dance hall on the second floor of the inn, where they slept on the wood shavings and sawdust-covered wood floor, packed in like sardines, and where the hygienic conditions were miserable and deplorable. (Note: Shortly before, these rooms were still being used by Messerschmitt AG to accommodate workers.) The windows were nailed shut and barb-wired. There was only one toilet and one water tap available. There was no possibility of care for the sick or those unable to work. The food was inadequate and consisted only of bread and soup. The open-air makeshift camp kitchen was located in the inner courtyard of the building directly across the street from the Colosseum, and was staffed by two Polish prisoners, one of whom was Tadeusz Sobolewicz.

By day the completely emaciated prisoners had to repair the damage after bombing raids on the railway station premises. To this end, the prisoners were forced to march over the Stone Bridge and through the old town center of Regensburg every morning and return every evening (with the sounds of wooden clogs on cobblestones clearly audible along the way). (Note: The distance from the Colosseum to the railroad yards is approximately 2 km (1.25 miles).) The work was life-threatening, not only from working through the air raids without shelter, but also due to the unexploded ordnance. (Note: At least 10 prisoners died in one air raid.) (Note: One Jewish survivor from Czechoslovakia, David Lester (1925–2009, b. David Lipovecky, Sečovce), gives an account of his survival of a bomb blast at the railroad yards, as well as his survival after being caught hiding in the hayloft of a barn in the last days of the death march from Regensburg to Laufen.) The SS guards and kapos regularly harassed and beat the prisoners to get them to work harder and faster. The prisoners were warned at morning roll call that any attempt at escape would result in the shooting of ten fellow inmates. At the end of the march procession back to the Colosseum, the somewhat stronger dragged the completely exhausted and injured, followed by the handcart with the dead and dying. After 12 hours of arduous labor, the prisoners were again forced to assemble for roll call, often for hours, and often subjected to further torment and beatings. (Note: One Polish survivor, Zbigniew Kołakowski (1925–2016, b. Bydgoszcz), recounted the terror that the SS guards and kapos of the command exercised on the prisoners: "Everyone had to do his job beyond his strength, and tried to do so, out of fear of being beaten.") According to other information, some of the prisoners also had to do forced labor in the Regensburg factory of Messerschmitt AG.

The guards included 50 SS men (Schutzstaffel “protection squadron” and SS-Totenkopfverbände "death’s head units") housed in the dining room on the ground floor, and also included many so-called ethnic Germans (Volksdeutsche). The command leader was SS-Oberscharführer (“senior squad leader”) Ludwig Plagge, a heavy drinker who was considered one of the “most brutal and cruel SS men” and was sentenced to death in the Auschwitz trial in Kraków in January 1947. (Note: A photograph of Ludwig Plagge, on sonderkommando.info.) His deputy was SS-Oberscharführer Erich Liedtke, who often beat and mistreated the prisoners without cause. John Demjanjuk, who was convicted of aiding and abetting murder in 2011, is said to have been among the SS guards.

On the night of April 22–23, 1945, the camp prisoners were evacuated, except for 28 seriously ill and one dead. The prisoners were forced to endure a nine-day death march heading south in the direction of Landshut and Mühldorf (on the Inn). The march was conducted primarily at night, to avoid detection by Allied aircraft, and by day the prisoners slept in roadside barns. Many of the prisoners were shot along the roadside or in nearby forests because they were too exhausted to keep up the pace, or when caught trying to escape, sometimes by hiding in the haylofts of barns where they stopped to rest. (Note: Tadeusz Sobolewicz recounted the event as an "express march" that was difficult to survive: "The weaker prisoners began to lag behind after two hours of marching, and the column dragged on. There were horrific scenes. [...] From the end of the column, which was about one and a half kilometers apart, the short cracking of submachine guns or carbines could be heard over and over again.") It is estimated that only 50 of the prisoners survived this march. The march ended when the survivors were abandoned by their SS guards, and liberated by the U.S. Army, on May 1, 1945, in Laufen (on the Salzach, on the Austrian border, near Salzburg). (Note: May 1st was the day after Adolf Hitler committed suicide. (Hitler made public appearances at the Regensburg Altes Rathaus ("old town hall") in October 1933 and June 1937.)) (Note: The straight-line distance from Regenburg to Laufen is about 155 km (96.3 miles), but the march took a tortuous route via Landshut, Vilsbiburg, Dorfen, Mühldorf, Neuötting, Altötting, Burghausen, Tittmoning, and Fridolfing, for a total distance of approximately 207 km (128.6 miles).) (Note: In Laufen, a small memorial marks the events, located at the corner of Tittmoninger Str. and Teisendorfer Str.) (Note: In the immediate aftermath, most of the march survivors, some with the assistance of local farmers, made their way to what some at first believed to be a hospital, but was in fact an actual prison, in the Lebenau-Forstgarten district of Laufen. The Lebenau prison had been a civilian women's prison before and during the war, then a temporary displaced persons (DP) camp in the immediate aftermath, and today is still used as a youth correctional facility. See JVA Laufen-Lebenau and Justizvollzugsanstalt Laufen-Lebenau.) (Note: After initial recuperation in Lebanau (most suffered from emaciation, lice and typhus), the survivors were eventually dispersed to various other DP camps in the American zone. Ultimately, most of the non-Jewish survivors were able to return to their home countries, and most of the Jewish survivors emigrated to the United States, Israel, or other countries.)

The exact number of fatalities among the Colosseum prisoners is not known. In the Regensburg registry office (Standesamt Regensburg), 35 deaths were recorded for the period between March 23 and April 10 alone, and a grave list of the city contains the names of 44 of the dead. A survivor of the Colosseum estimates the number of dead in the five weeks of its existence at 70 men. It is believed that some corpses were thrown into the Danube without registering them.

== Neighboring subcamp ==
The Obertraubling satellite camp (today located in neighboring Neutraubling) was operated by the SS from February 20 to April 16, 1945, as a satellite camp of the Flossenbürg concentration camp in the municipality of Obertraubling, a southern suburb of Regensburg, on the premises of Messerschmitt AG. It was located next to a forced labor camp in the Messerschmitt factory. The completely emaciated concentration camp prisoners had to repair damage to the runway of a company airfield that had been bombed, at risk of death. After a regional reform and the incorporation of surrounding communities, the area of one of the former forced labor camps, the so-called Russenlager (Russian camp), now belongs to the city of Regensburg.

== Investigations in the post-war period ==
The Central Office for the Investigation of Nazi Crimes (in Ludwigsburg) investigated the events of the Regensburg subcamp in the 1960s. The proceedings were later taken over by the Munich public prosecutor's office (Staatsanwaltschaft München), and discontinued in the 1970s.

After the end of the war, the Colosseum was used again as a bar with a dance hall and later as a performance location for a peasant theater (Bauerntheater). In the summer of 2006, a new owner had the building gutted and renovated, and built a restaurant and a residential complex in it.

== Commemoration ==
In October 1950, the President of the Bavarian State Compensation Office, Philipp Auerbach, inaugurated a concentration camp memorial for an unknown number of foreign concentration camp prisoners buried in the Evangelical Central Cemetery in Regensburg. (Note: In addition to the one in Regensburg, the following six newly designed “concentration camp cemeteries” were inaugurated: Saal an der Donau (380 dead); Wetterfeld (Roding) (600 dead); Muschenried (Winklarn) (333 dead); Flossenbürg (73,000 dead); Amberg; Ansbach. Per information from the program of the fifth trip to the inauguration of concentration camp memorials on November 4 and 5, 1950.) The Lord Mayor (Oberbürgermeister "Burgomaster") of Regensburg, Georg Zitzler, laid a wreath. When the graves of several of the dead were exhumed in the spring of 1955 (and the remains relocated to Flossenbürg), the concentration camp memorial and the associated small stone blocks with the engraved number of dead and their nationality were also removed. The details of the removal and the whereabouts of the memorial have not yet been clarified. (Note: Simon-Pelanda also reports in it that the search for the stones was unsuccessful.)

After the student group work at the Regensburg Vocational School for Business (Berufsfachschule für Wirtschaft Regensburg) with its theme of the Colosseum subcamp had won a second prize in the Federal President’s History Competition (Geschichtswettbewerb des Bundespräsidenten) in 1982/83, the question of an appropriate memorial for the victims was raised again. (Note: The Federal President's History Competition (Geschichtswettbewerb des Bundespräsidenten) has been held in Germany by the Körber Foundation (Körber-Stiftung) since 1973. The aim of the competition is to get young people to grapple with the history of Germany.) In the student work, according to the summary, a proper memorial plaque should be placed on the Colosseum building to serve as a reminder that the city should not forget or keep silent about the less pleasant aspects of its history. The city administration initially assured the students, who even donated part of their prize money to implement their demands, that the city would put up a plaque, but to this day, no such plaque has been installed. (Note: The students' donation was supposedly used for "similar" purposes.)

In the early 1990s, on a non-partisan initiative, a memorial plaque was made to commemorate the Colosseum subcamp, which was attached to the railing of the Stone Bridge without the support of the city administration. (Note: The defensive city administration feared that the city of Regensburg could be stigmatized as a "concentration camp community", and that the victims of the concentration camp external commands should be commemorated in a central memorial.) In 1994, this was replaced by a large memorial stone, which was inaugurated by Mayor Christa Meier.

This abstract work of Flossenbürg granite and limestone is located in a free space (combination mini-park and bicycle parking lot) opposite the Colosseum, but offset by approximately 70 meters on the other side of the street. (Note: More precisely, the memorial stone is located at the corner of Am Brückenbasar and Andreasstraße. Am Brückenbasar is the short connector between the Stone Bridge and Stadtamhof (main street).) The carved inscription avoids naming or specifying the exact location of the former Colosseum subcamp. It is worded as follows:

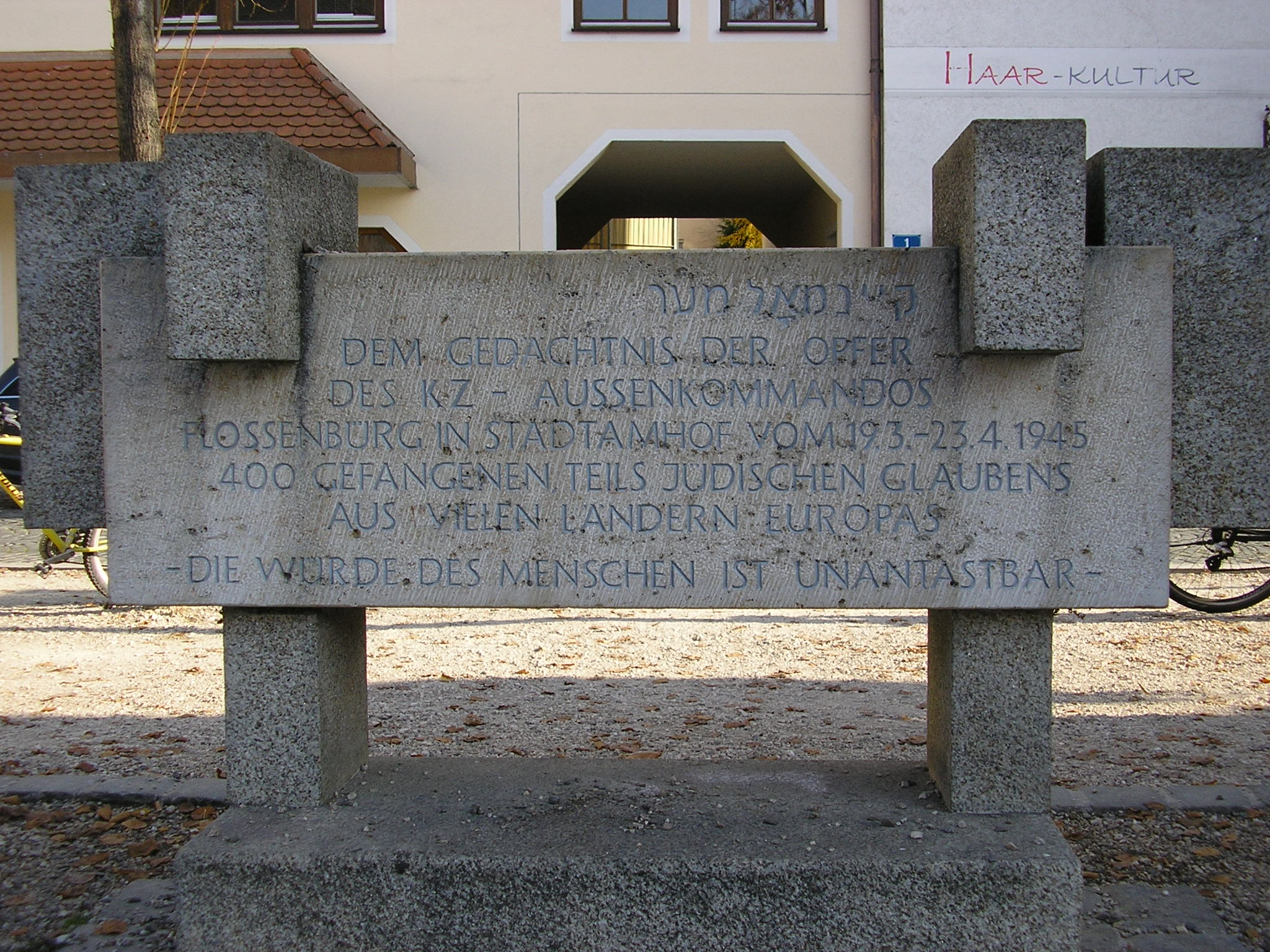
Memorial stone of the Regensburg subcamp of Flossenbürg (2011)

NEVER AGAIN (in Yiddish: קיינמאל מער – keynmal mer – "not once more")
THE MEMORY OF THE VICTIMS
OF THE FLOSSENBÜRG CONCENTRATION CAMP,
REGENSBURG SUBCAMP IN STADTAMHOF,
FROM MARCH 19 TO APRIL 23, 1945,
400 PRISONERS, MANY OF JEWISH FAITH,
FROM MANY COUNTRIES IN EUROPE.
– HUMAN DIGNITY IS INVIOLABLE –

In 2008, an initiative by the Regensburg city council group The Greens for a memorial plaque on the Colosseum was rejected by the CSU and SPD parties. In April 2011, a bronze memorial plaque was laid on the sidewalk in front of the Colosseum building on behalf of the city of Regensburg (without public notice or input from local community groups). It was subsequently removed in April 2016. (Note: To be clear, this plaque was not a stolperstein (literally "stumbling stone", metaphorically a "stumbling block"), a brass plate inscribed with the name and life dates of victims of Nazi extermination or persecution. Both the material, and the intention, are different. The Stolpersteine Project, initiated by German artist Gunter Demnig in 1992, aims to commemorate individuals at their last place of residence which was freely chosen by the person before they fell victim to Nazi terror. See also: Stolpersteine Regensburg (German).) The plaque's inscription read:

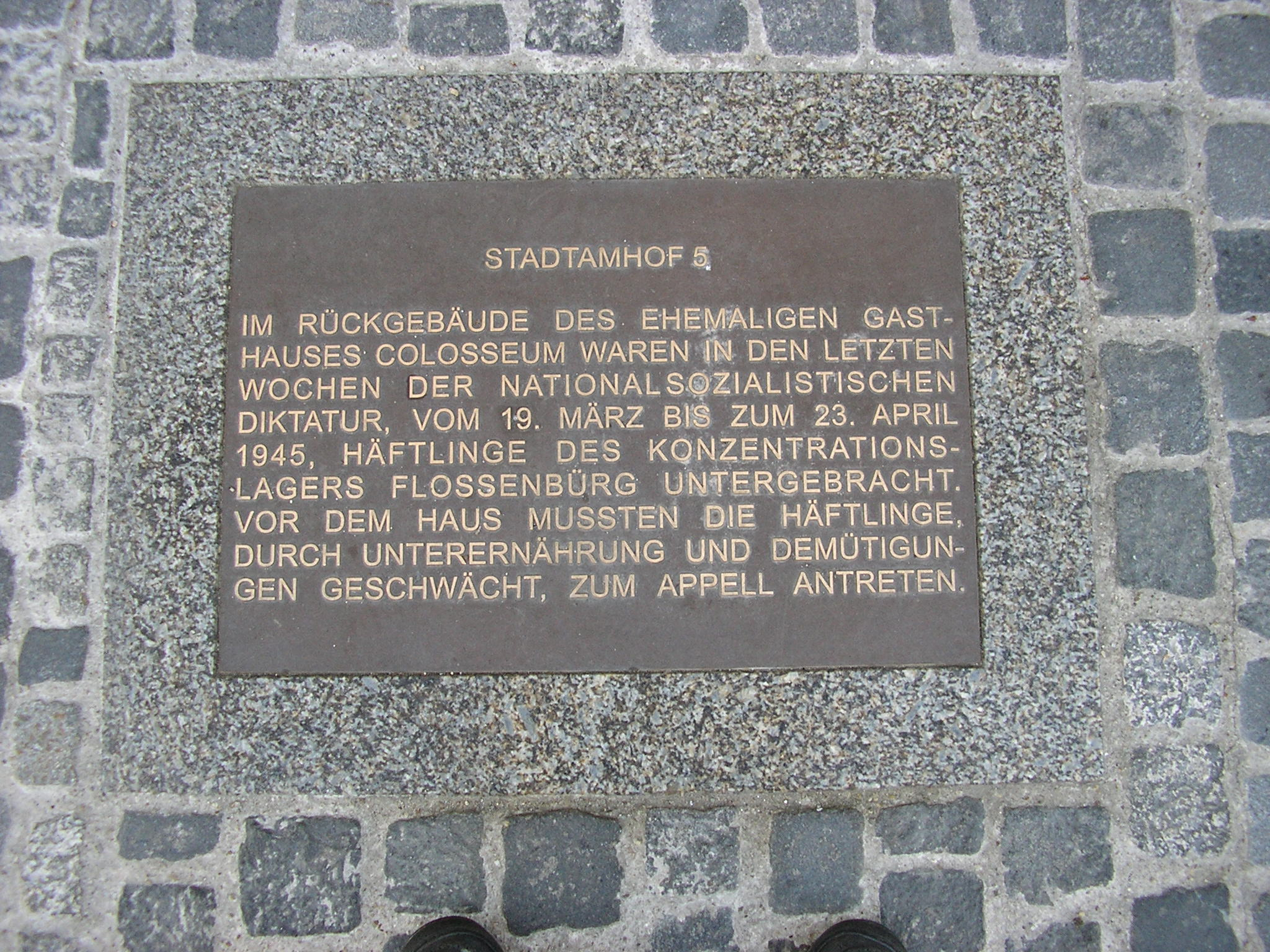
Memorial plaque on the sidewalk in front of the Colosseum (2011)

STADTAMHOF 5

PRISONERS OF THE CONCENTRATION CAMP FLOSSENBÜRG WERE HOUSED
IN THE BACK BUILDING OF THE FORMER GUEST HOUSE COLOSSEUM,
IN THE LAST WEEKS OF THE NATIONAL SOCIALIST (NAZI) DICTATORSHIP,
FROM MARCH 19 TO APRIL 23, 1945.
IN FRONT OF THE HOUSE, THE PRISONERS,
WEAKENED BY MALNUTRITION AND HUMILIATIONS,
HAD TO ASSEMBLE FOR ROLL CALL.

The plaque's text was created under the auspices of the city's cultural department and, after it became known, was heavily criticized in a public debate as trivializing and misleading. The inscription was quite controversial, and there were many protests, due to the protesters feeling that the inscribed words played down the historical facts. The politically responsible culture committee of the Regensburg city council then decided in November 2011 that the technically responsible culture department should invite a non-partisan working group. They were supposed to work out a proposal for an appropriate and politically meaningful inscription text or for an urban memorial concept regarding the Nazi era.

After years of political wrangling and delay, the memorial plaque was removed in April 2016, and replaced by a small information panel (in German and English) placed directly on the Colosseum building, and a two-sided standing information panel (in German and English) was also installed next to the memorial stone down and across the street. (Note: The English text of the small information panel reads: "A sub-camp of the Flossenbürg concentration camp system was housed in this building between March 19th and April 23rd 1945. Over 40 people died here during that time. A memorial to those who died stands opposite. Next to the memorial are information panels." See photograph on regensburg-digital.de.) (Note: PDF images of the two information panels. with text, photographs, brief survivor testimonies, and a map. (in German and English). on regensburg-digital.de. April 2016.) (Note: A photograph of the Colosseum in 1940, on regensburg-digital.de.) (Note: A photograph showing the standing information panel next to the memorial stone, on regensburg-digital.de.)

Since the end of the 1990s, there has been a memorial march in Regensburg on April 23, which is carried out by non-partisan work groups and also commemorates the fate of the prisoners in the Colosseum satellite camp. (Note: Survivors Zbigniew Kołakowski (1925–2016) and Tadeusz Sobolewicz (1925–2015) returned to Regensburg on several occasions to participate in these commemoration ceremonies.) For many years, official representatives of the city of Regensburg did not take part. The city administration had repeatedly ignored suggestions from the volunteer working groups to commemorate all victims of National Socialism in an event jointly with the city of Regensburg. (Note: Expressed in an open letter from the ArGe to Mayor Hans Schaidinger in July 2007.)

In 2015, for the first time, various city government officials and community groups came together and agreed to join in the commemoration ceremonies. Representatives included Regensburg Mayor Joachim Wolbergs (SPD party), city council members of the left- and center-leaning political parties, representatives of the Catholic and Protestant churches, (Note: The events also commemorated Regensburg Cathedral priest Johann Maier. After U.S. Army tank units had already reached the Danube, local Nazi leaders demanded a full defense of the city. On April 23rd, in a public speech at Dachauplatz, Maier called for a peaceful handover of the city. Maier was arrested, tried in a drumhead court-martial, and hung on April 24th, wearing a sign which read "I am a saboteur". Two others, Michael Lottner and Josef Zirkl, were arrested with Maier; Lottner was shot during interrogation, and Zirkl was hung with Maier. On April 26th, the SS and Wehrmacht units fled the city, and on April 27th, the city unconditionally surrendered and was handed over to the U.S. Third Army without a fight. Due to the militarily motivated troop withdrawal and unconditional surrender, the city remained largely undestroyed.) Pax Christi, (Note: See also: pax christi Regensburg.) the VVN-BdA, (Note: See also: Vereinigung der Verfolgten des Naziregimes – Bund der Antifaschistinnen und Antifaschisten, Kreisvereinigung Regensburg ("Association of Persecutees of the Nazi Regime – Federation of Antifascists, Regensburg District Association").) the DGB, (Note: See also: German Trade Union Confederation (Deutscher Gewerkschaftsbund).) the Falcons, (Note: See also: Sozialistische Jugend Deutschlands – Die Falken ("Socialist Youth of Germany – The Falcons").) the anti-fascist group anita f., and as always, the ArGe (Note: Arbeitsgemeinschaft ehemaliges KZ Flossenbürg e.V. ("Working Community of the Former Flossenbürg Concentration Camp"), in Regensburg.) and the Regensburg Jewish community. (Note: See also: History of the Jews in Regensburg and Regensburg Synagogue.) About 500 people joined in the 2015 events. However, as had long been the case, the conservative right-leaning CSU party (the largest party in Regensburg with 25% of the city council seats) continued to boycott the ceremonies. In 2016, for the first time, city council members of the CSU party finally relented and agreed to join with the rest of the city administration and community groups in participating in the annual commemoration events.

== Gallery ==
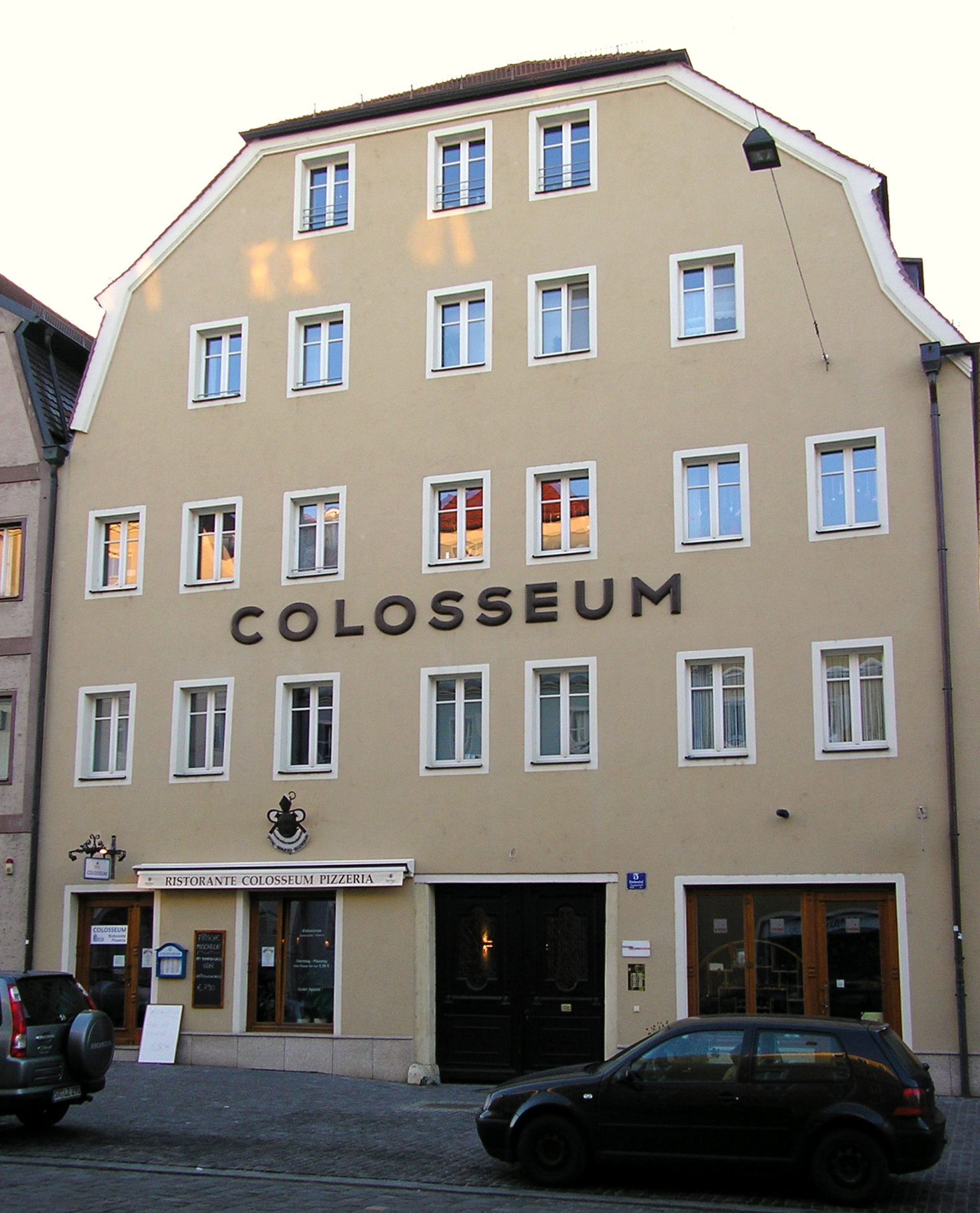
The Colosseum (2011)

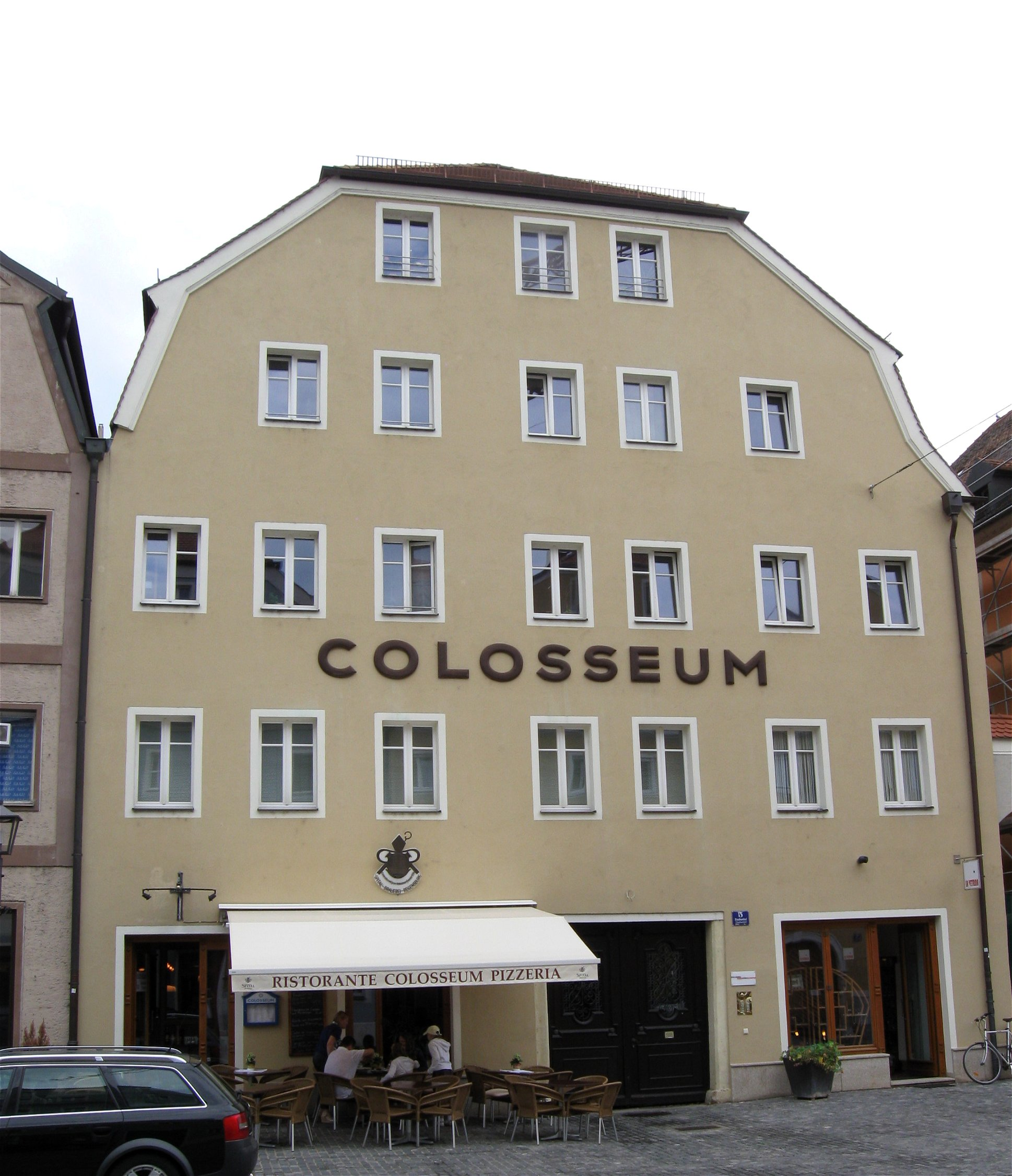
The Colosseum (2012)

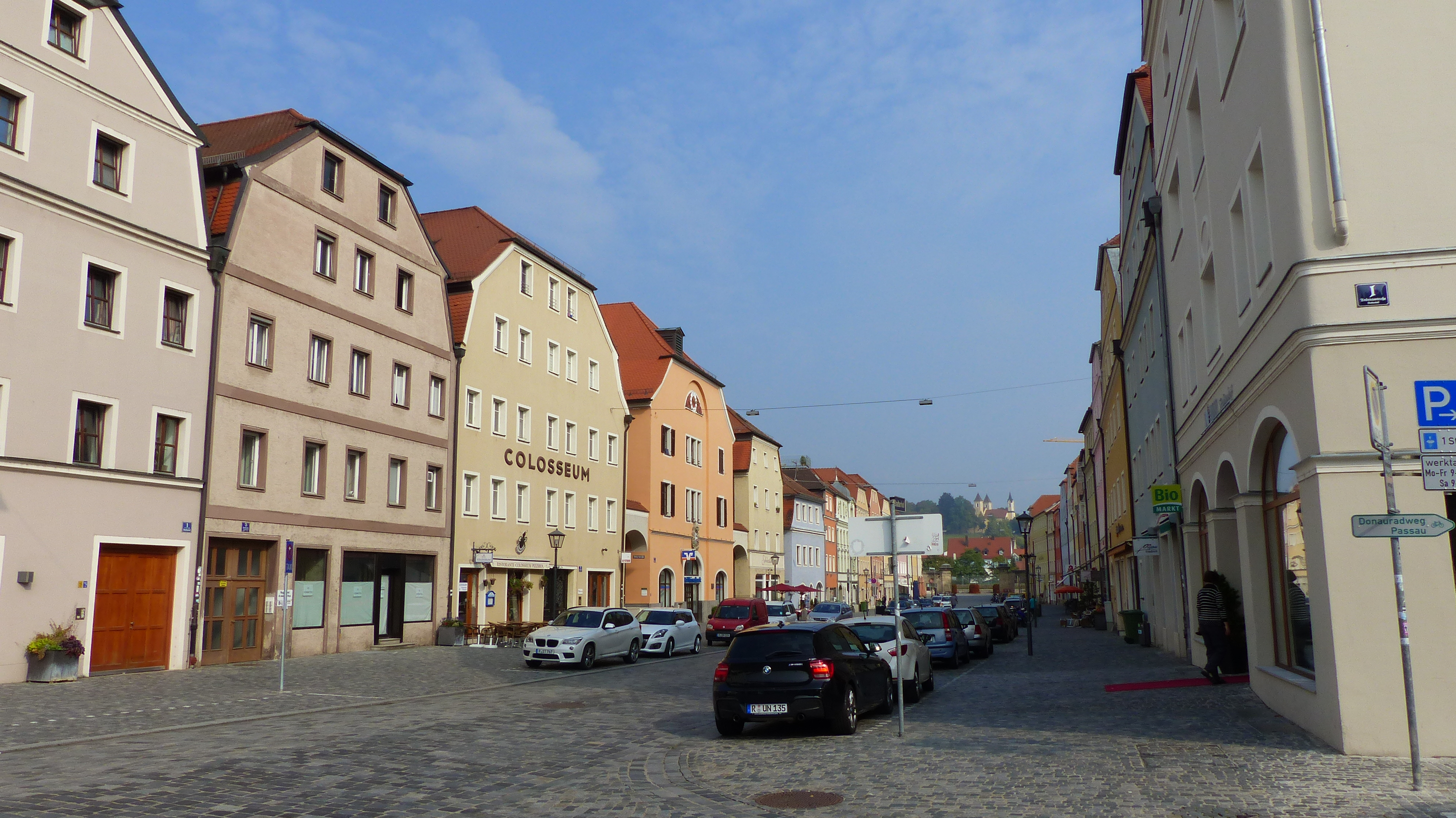
The Colosseum, from the corner of the small open space where the memorial stone stands. (2014)

From in front of the Colosseum. On the left is the small open space where the memorial stone stands. (2008)

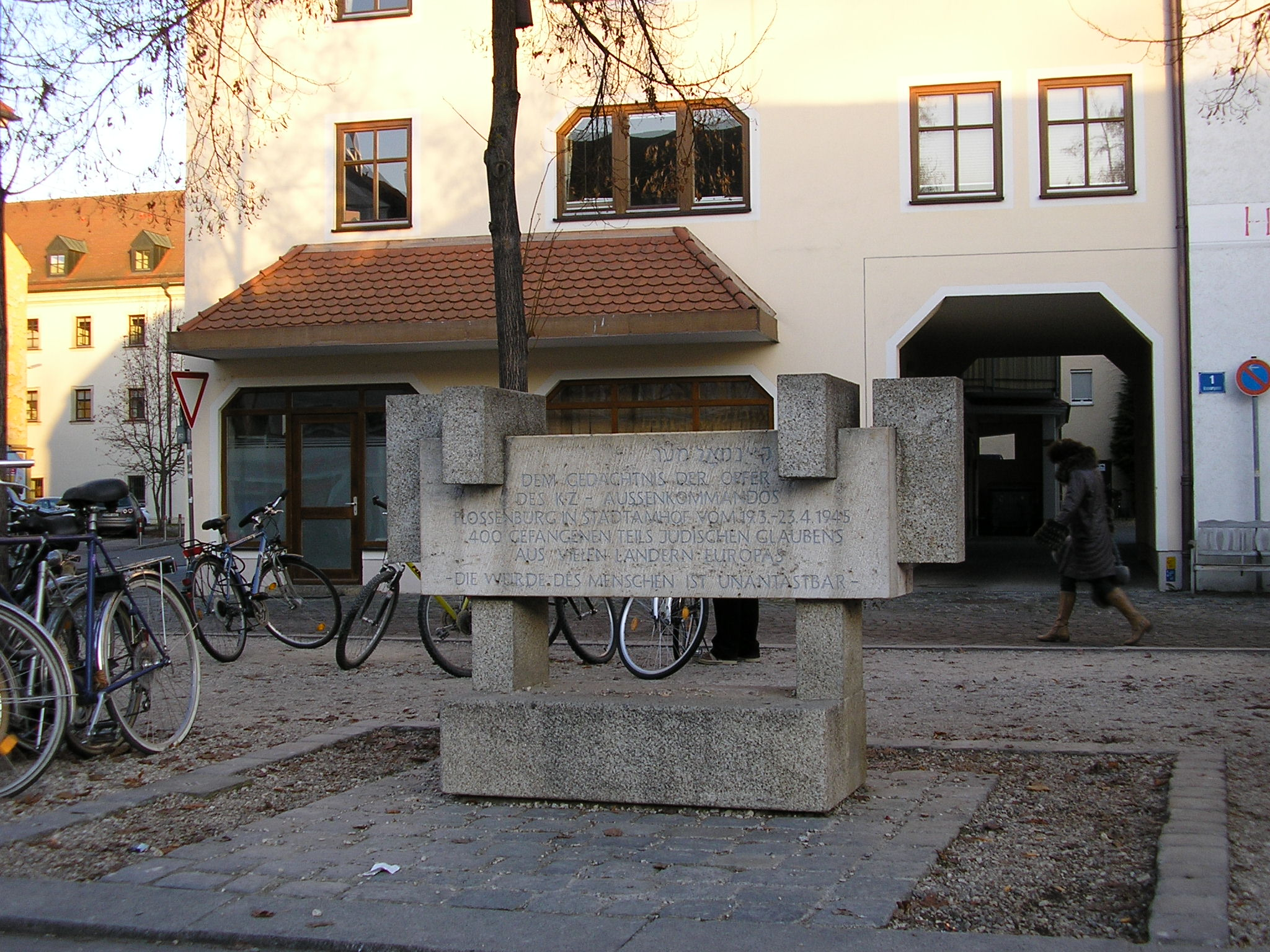
The Regensburg subcamp memorial stone (2011)

The Stone Bridge (Steinerne Brücke), the Altstadt beyond, looking south (2008)

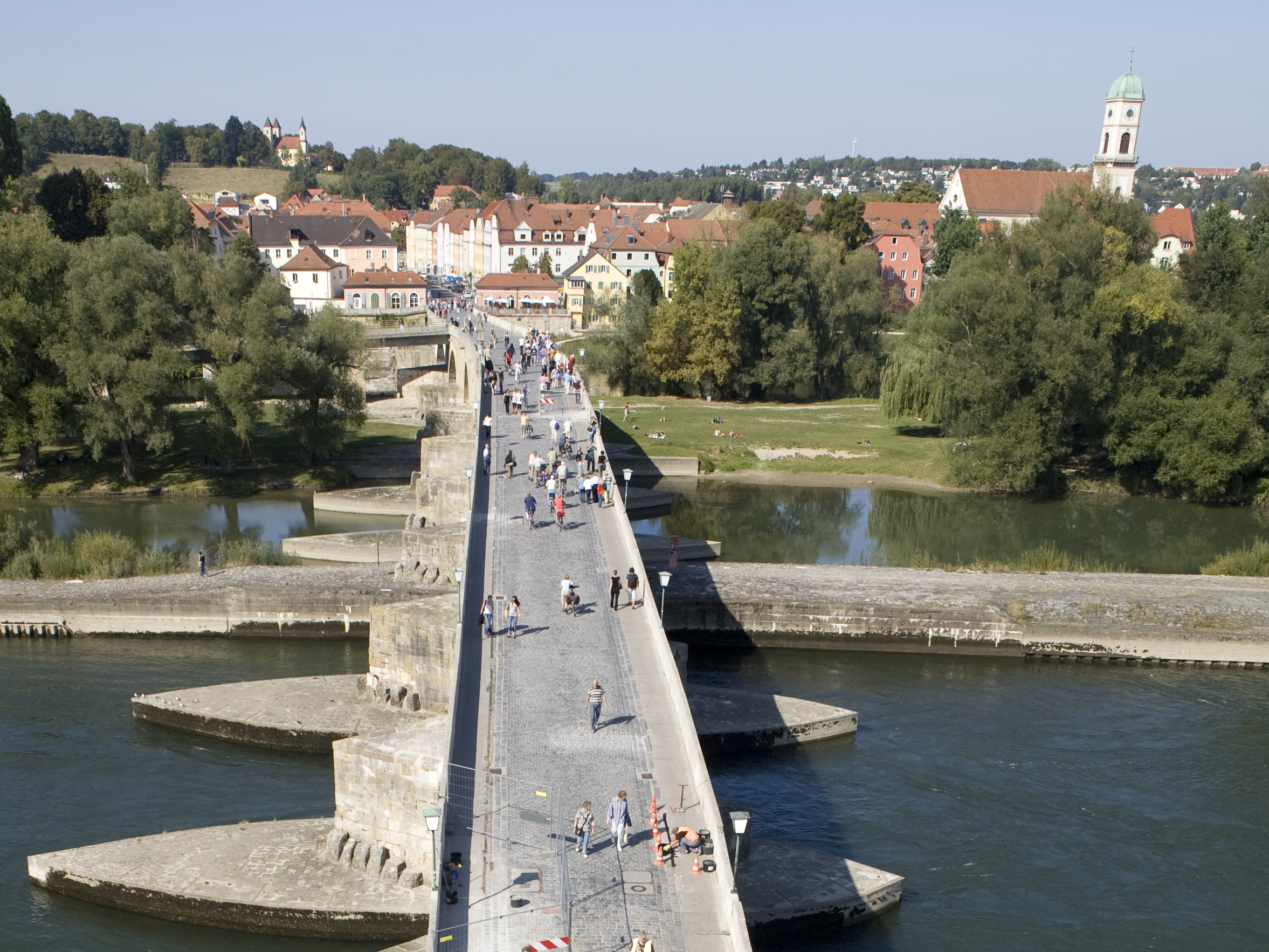
The Stone Bridge in the foreground, Stadtamhof beyond, looking north (2009)

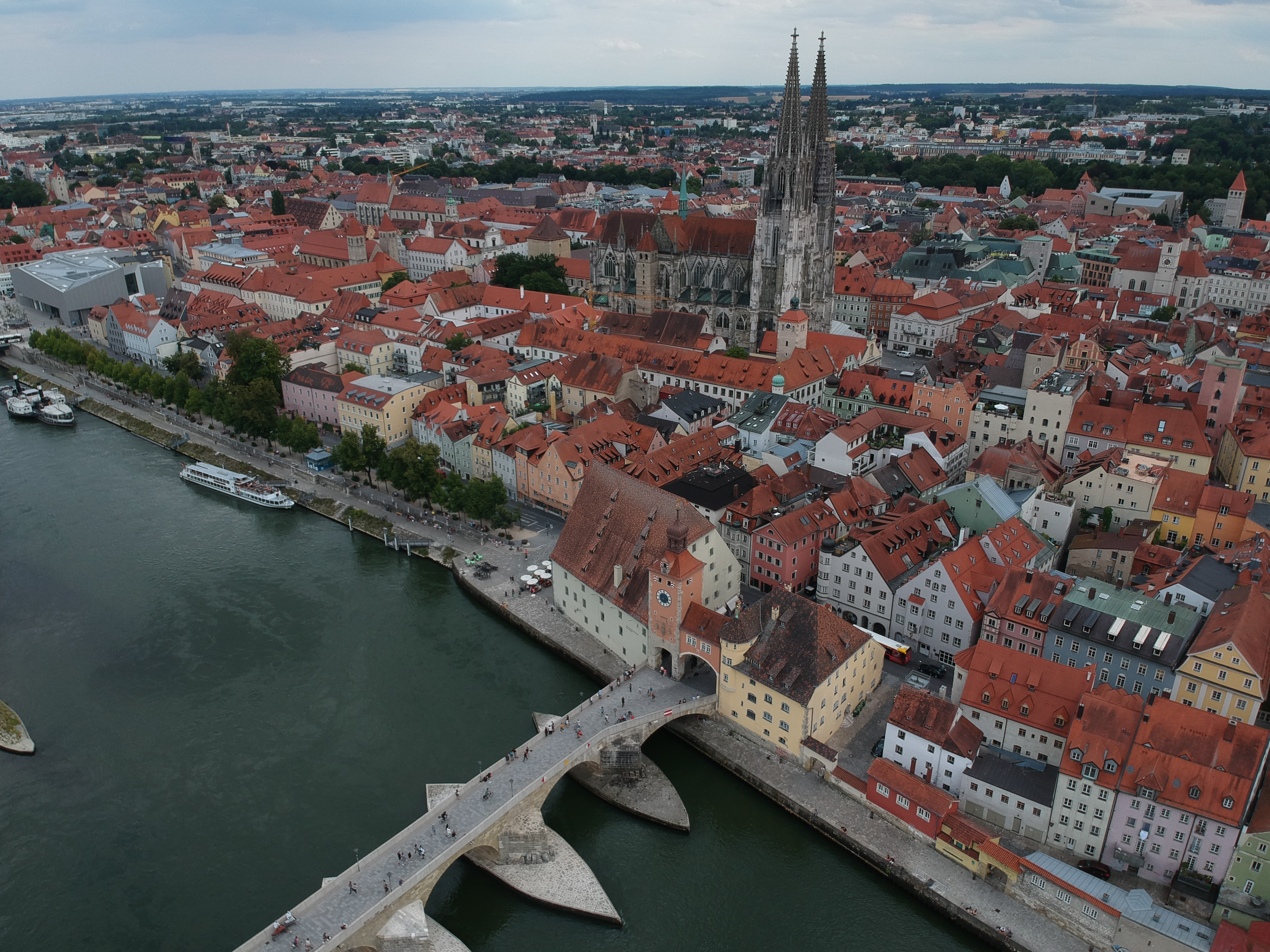
Regensburg Altstadt (old town center) (2019)

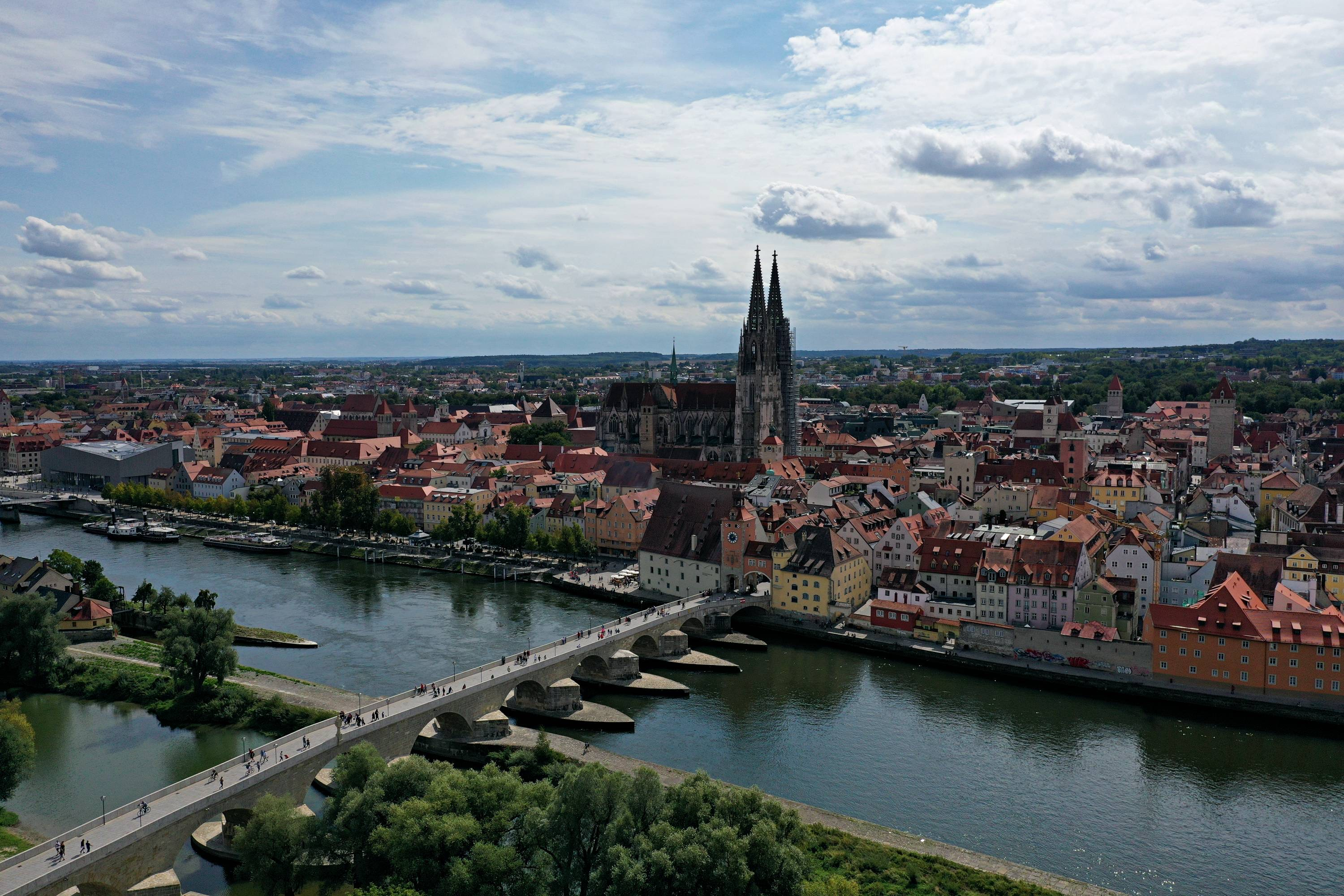
Regensburg Altstadt (2020)

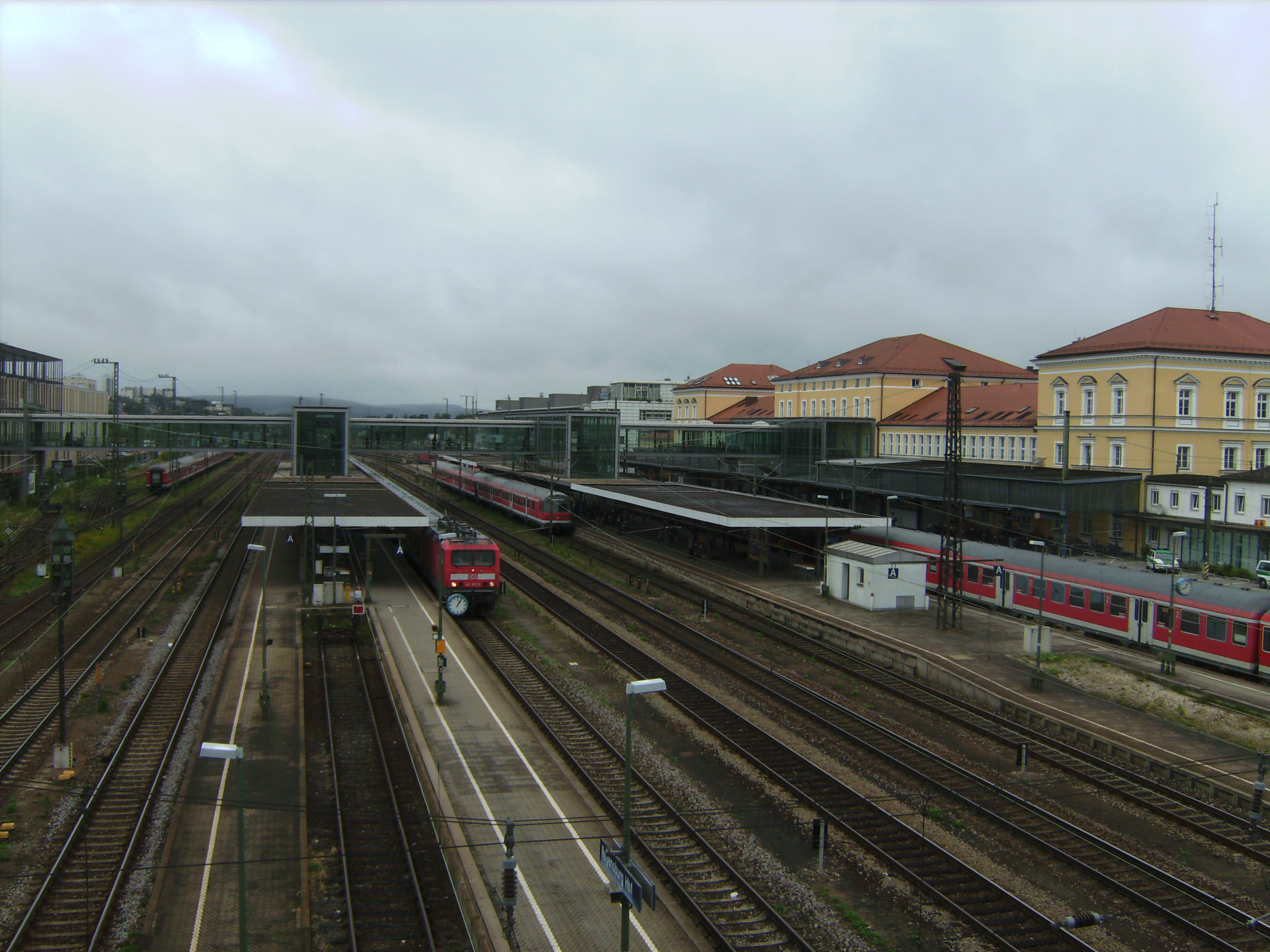
Regensburg Hauptbahnhof (main railway station), looking west (2007)

Regensburg railroad yards, looking east (from the Kumpfmühler Str. overpass) (2006)

Regensburg railroad yards, looking west (from the Kumpfmühler Str. overpass) (2006)

== See also ==
- List of subcamps of Flossenbürg

== Bibliography ==
- Peter Brendel, et al.: "Das Lager Colosseum in Regensburg" ("The Colosseum Camp in Regensburg"), pp. 251–269. In: Dieter Galinski, Wolf Schmidt (ed.): Die Kriegsjahre in Deutschland 1939 bis 1945: Ergebnisse und Anregungen aus dem Schülerwettbewerb Deutsche Geschichte um den Preis des Bundespräsidenten 1982/83 ("The War Years in Germany 1939 to 1945: Results and Suggestions from the German History Student Competition for the Federal President's Prize 1982/83"). Körber-Stiftung ("Körber Foundation") and Verlag Erziehung und Wissenschaft ("Education and Science Publishing"), Hamburg, 1985, OCLC 977522321. Extract from a prize-winning student group work from the 1982/83 Federal President’s History Competition, by students in Class BFS-11a of the Regensburg Vocational School for Business. See Körber Foundation annotated bibliography (pdf), 2007, p. 10.
- Ulrich Fritz: "Regensburg", pp. 240–243. In: Wolfgang Benz, Barbara Distel (ed.): Der Ort des Terrors ("The Place of Terrors"): Geschichte der nationalsozialistischen Konzentrationslager ("History of the National Socialist Concentration Camps"), Vol. 4: Flossenbürg, Mauthausen, Ravensbrück. Verlag C.H. Beck oHG, Munich, 2006, ISBN 3-406-52964-X. Nine-volume German language encyclopedia of the Nazi concentration camps and subcamps, published between 2005 and 2009.
- Helmut Halter: Stadt unterm Hakenkreuz: Kommunalpolitik in Regensburg während der NS-Zeit ("City Under the Swastika: Local Politics in Regensburg During the Nazi Era"). Universitätsverlag Regensburg ("University of Regensburg Press"), Regensburg, 1994, ISBN 3-9803470-6-0.
- Peter Heigl: Konzentrationslager Flossenbürg: In Geschichte und Gegenwart ("Flossenbürg Concentration Camp: Past and Present"). Mittelbayerische Druckerei- und Verlags-Gesellschaft mbH ("Central Bavarian Printing and Publishing Co."), now Mittelbayerischer Verlag KG, Regensburg, 1989, ISBN 3-921114-29-2.
- Ernst Klee: Das Personenlexikon zum Dritten Reich (The Encyclopedia of Persons of the Third Reich"): Wer war was vor und nach 1945 ("Who Was What Before and After 1945"). S. Fischer Verlag, Frankfurt, 2003, p. 462, ISBN 3-10-039309-0.
- Philip Markowicz: My Three Lives. Ch. 15: "Regensburg", pp. 174–185. Dorrance Publishing Co., Inc., Pittsburgh, 2009, ISBN 978-1-4349-0317-4. Markowicz (1924–2017, b. Przerąb), a Jewish survivor from Poland, gives a detailed account of his life story in three parts: his pre-war life in Poland, his Holocaust survival story, and his post-war life in Toledo, Ohio. See also:

- My Three Lives. on University of Toledo Press. utoledopress.com. ISBN 978-1-7369164-1-4. Re-release of the above book which is no longer in print.
- David Yonke: "Holocaust Survivor Shares Story of Faith". on The Blade. toledoblade.com. April 17, 2010.
- Mark Zaborney: "Philip Markowicz (1924–2017)". on The Blade. toledoblade.com. November 9, 2017.
- "Philip Markowicz (1924–2017)" (pdf). on s3.amazonaws.com. November 2017.
- "Philip Markowicz video testimorny". segments 108–121. USC Shoah Foundation Visual History Archive. Los Angeles. Interviewed January 29, 1998. on vha.usc.edu.

- Sylvia Seifert: "Das KZ-Außenlager Colosseum: Berichte über das Lagerleben" (pdf) (German) ("The Colosseum Subcamp: Reports on Camp Life"), pp. 86–95. In: pax christi Regensburg und der Arbeitsgemeinschaft für ehemalige ZwangsarbeiterInnen im Evangelischen Bildungswerk Regensburg e.V. ("Pax Christi Regensburg and the Working Group for Former Forced Laborers in the Evangelical Educational Institute") (ed.): Begegnungen mit ehemaligen ZwangsarbeiterInnen ("Encounters with Former Forced Laborers"). edition buntehunde GdbR (publisher), Regensburg, 2003, ISBN 3-934941-07-9, on Shalom in Regensburg.
- Hans Simon-Pelanda: "Im Herzen der Stadt: Das Außenlager Colosseum in Regensburg" ("In the Heart of the City: The Colosseum Subcamp in Regensburg"), pp. 159–168. In: Wolfgang Benz, Barbara Distel (ed.): Dachauer Hefte ("Dachau Booklets"), Vol. 12: Konzentrationslager: Lebenswelt und Umfeld ("Concentration Camp: Living World and Environment"). Verlag Dachauer Hefte ("Dachau Booklets Publishing"), Dachau, 1996, ISSN 0257-9472. The Dachauer Booklets have been published since 1985. They contain studies and documents on the history of the Nazi concentration camps. The content of the booklets relates to all Nazi concentration camps, not just to the Dachau concentration camp.
- Tadeusz Sobolewicz: But I Survived. Ch. 11: "Regensburg", pp. 257–293. Auschwitz-Birkenau State Museum, Oświęcim, 1998, ISBN 83-85047-63-8. Sobolewicz (1925–2015, b. Poznań), a Polish survivor of six Nazi concentration camps, a Gestapo prison, and a nine-day death march, gives a detailed account of his Holocaust history. See also: Tadeusz Sobolewicz.
- Tadeusz Sobolewicz: Wytrzymałem więc jestem ("I endured, therefore I am") (Polish original). Auschwitz-Birkenau State Museum, Oświęcim, 1986, ISBN 83-216-0674-1.
- Tadeusz Sobolewicz: Aus dem Jenseits zurück ("Back from the Beyond") (German). Auschwitz-Birkenau State Museum, Oświęcim, 1993, ISBN 83-85047-09-3.
- Tadeusz Sobolewicz: Aus der Hölle zurück: Von der Willkür des Überlebens im Konzentrationslager ("Back from Hell: On the Arbitrariness of Survival in the Concentration Camp") (German). S. Fischer Verlag, Frankfurt, 1999, ISBN 3-596-14179-6.
- Henk Verheyen: Bis ans Ende der Erinnerung ("Until the End of Remembrance"). Pahl-Rugenstein Verlag, Bonn, 2009, ISBN 978-3-89144-421-4.
- Evelyn Zegenhagen: "Regensburg [aka Colosseum]", pp. 661–663. In: Geoffrey P. Megargee (ed.): Encyclopedia of Camps and Ghettos, 1933–1945, Vol. 1: Early Camps, Youth Camps, and Concentration Camps and Subcamps under the SS-Business Administration Main Office (WVHA). United States Holocaust Memorial Museum and Indiana University Press, Bloomington, 2009, ISBN 978-0-253-35328-3. Seven-volume encyclopedia of the history of the concentration camps, ghettos, forced labor camps, and other sites of detention, persecution, or state-sponsored murder run by Nazi Germany and other Axis powers in Europe and Africa. See also: Encyclopedia of Camps and Ghettos, 1933–1945.
