= Tadeusz Sobolewicz =

Polish actor, author and public speaker

Tadeusz Sobolewicz (Polish pronunciation: [taˈdɛ.uʂ sɔbɔˈlɛvit͡ʂ]; 26 March 1925 – 28 October 2015) was a Polish actor, author, and public speaker. He survived six Nazi concentration camps, a Gestapo prison and a nine-day death march.

== Life ==
Tadeusz Sobolewicz was born in Poznań, Poland. Prior to the outbreak of World War II, he attended Paderewski Gymnasium (secondary school) and was a member of the boy scouts.

When the war broke out, he and his mother and younger brother were forced to flee from Poznań. During the German occupation of Poland, together with his father, who was a Polish army officer, Sobolewicz became an active member of the Polish resistance movement. He served as a liaison officer for the area command of the Union of Armed Struggle (Związek Walki Zbrojnej, or ZWZ), first in Tarnów and then later in Częstochowa.

Living underground and under a false name, he was eventually betrayed, arrested by the Gestapo on 1 September 1941 and transferred to Zawodzie (Częstochowa) Gestapo prison. In prison the Gestapo interrogated and severely beat him in order to learn the names of other resistance movement fighters from him, but he revealed nothing and as he was being led away, he saw that his father was likewise brought in for interrogation. Sobolewicz was deported to Auschwitz concentration camp on 20 November 1941, where he was issued a striped uniform, wooden clogs, a red triangle badge for political prisoners and the number 23053.

Sobolewicz endured the entire rest of the war in six concentration camps, first and longest in Auschwitz (until 10 March 1943) and then in Buchenwald, Leipzig (subcamp of Buchenwald), Mülsen (subcamp of Flossenbürg), Flossenbürg and Regensburg (subcamp of Flossenbürg).

In Mülsen, on 1 May 1944, Soviet prisoners staged an uprising and mass escape attempt from the camp located in the arms factory cellars. They set their bunks on fire, and the flames and smoke quickly filled the cellars. SS guards prevented any rescue and shot at those who tried to escape. Nearly 200 prisoners (out of 1,000) died from burns and wounds sustained in the uprising. Sobolewicz suffered severe burns in the fire and narrowly escaped death. Survivors of the fire were loaded onto trucks and driven five hours non-stop to Flossenbürg. With the help of fellow Polish prisoners, Sobolewicz spent the next three months recuperating from his burns in the camp hospital barracks.

Sobolewicz and about 500 other prisoners were transported to Regensburg on 19 March 1945. In Regensburg, by day the prisoners were forced to clear bomb debris, fill bomb craters and repair the railroad yards, often under Allied bombardment, and by night they slept on the wood shavings covered floor of a dance hall. This building, called the Colosseum, was renovated in 2006, and is located in Stadtamhof (district), less than 200 meters north of the Danube river and the Steinerne Brücke (old stone bridge), which connects Stadtamhof to the Altstadt (old town center) and the railroad yards beyond. Sobolewicz worked as one of two cooks in the open-air camp kitchen, which was located in the inner courtyard of the building directly across the street from the Colosseum.

On the night of 23 April 1945, as the American army was approaching from the north, the SS evacuated the prisoners on a nine-day death march south and east toward the Austrian border. All along the march route, the SS shot dead those who could not keep up the pace or who tried to escape. The prisoners were forced to march at night and by day slept in barns to avoid detection by Allied aircraft.

Towards the end of the march, with the remaining prisoners suffering from severe hunger and exhaustion and word spreading that Hitler had committed suicide and that the American Army was closing in on them, Sobolewicz and some comrades managed to escape the march by hiding in the hayloft of a barn and the SS ultimately abandoned the rest of the surviving prisoners. Of the approximately 400 prisoners who started the march, less than 50 survived.

Sobolewicz and other survivors made their way to local farm hamlets, where the local farmers took them in and gave them food and shelter until the American army arrived. They were finally liberated near Laufen, Germany, along the Austrian border near Salzburg, on 1 May 1945. Sobolewicz eventually made his way to an army hospital unit, was diagnosed with tuberculosis and spent the next several months recuperating in hospitals in the foothills of the Alps, before finally returning to Poland in 1946.

Upon returning to Poland, Sobolewicz was reunited with his mother, who survived five years in Ravensbrück, and with his younger brother, who fought in the Polish Home Army (Armia Krajowa, or AK, the main Polish resistance organization). But he had to endure the loss of his father, who was gassed in Birkenau on 20 June 1942, his grandfather, who was shot dead by SS henchmen for helping Jewish friends, his cousin, who was murdered in the Katyń massacre, and many others.

Sobolewicz is the author of the book, But I Survived, which describes his life and experiences from the beginning of World War II until he regained his freedom at the end of the war. The book was originally written in Polish and later translated into German, English and Spanish. When his book was first published, it was awarded the first prize at the Polish Auschwitz Recollections Competition organized by the Auschwitz-Birkenau State Museum in 1985.

Sobolewicz attributed his survival mainly to sheer luck and coincidence, as so many of his comrades perished along the way, but also to his strong will to survive, the help of God, his strong desire to reunite with his mother and family, and his strong desire to bear witness to the atrocities committed by Nazi Germany, in the hope that they may never be repeated.

For the rest of his life Sobolewicz lived in Kraków, Poland. He worked as an actor in the Theater for over 40 years, which had helped him to deal with and share his experiences. He also served as a consultant and played the role of an SS officer in the 1989 film, Triumph of the Spirit. He frequently gave talks to various groups of all ages, especially youth groups on student trips to Auschwitz, about his life and experiences during the Holocaust. He is buried at the Rakowicki Cemetery in Kraków.

== Books by Tadeusz Sobolewicz ==
- Wytrzymałem więc jestem. (Polish, 1986). Oświęcim: Auschwitz-Birkenau State Museum. ISBN 83-216-0674-1.

The below titles are translations of the above Polish original.

- Aus dem Jenseits zurück. (German, 1993). Oświęcim: Auschwitz-Birkenau State Museum. ISBN 83-85047-09-3.
- Aus der Hölle zurück: Von der Willkür des Überlebens im Konzentrationslager. (German, 1999). Frankfurt: Fischer. ISBN 3-596-14179-6.
- But I Survived. (English, 1998). Oświęcim: Auschwitz-Birkenau State Museum. ISBN 83-85047-63-8.
- He Sobrevivido al Infierno. (Spanish, 2002). Oświęcim: Auschwitz-Birkenau State Museum. ISBN 978-83-88526-26-8.
