= Protestant Central Cemetery, Regensburg =

Lutheran church operated cemetery in Regensburg, Germany

Der Evangelische Zentralfriedhof in Regensburg
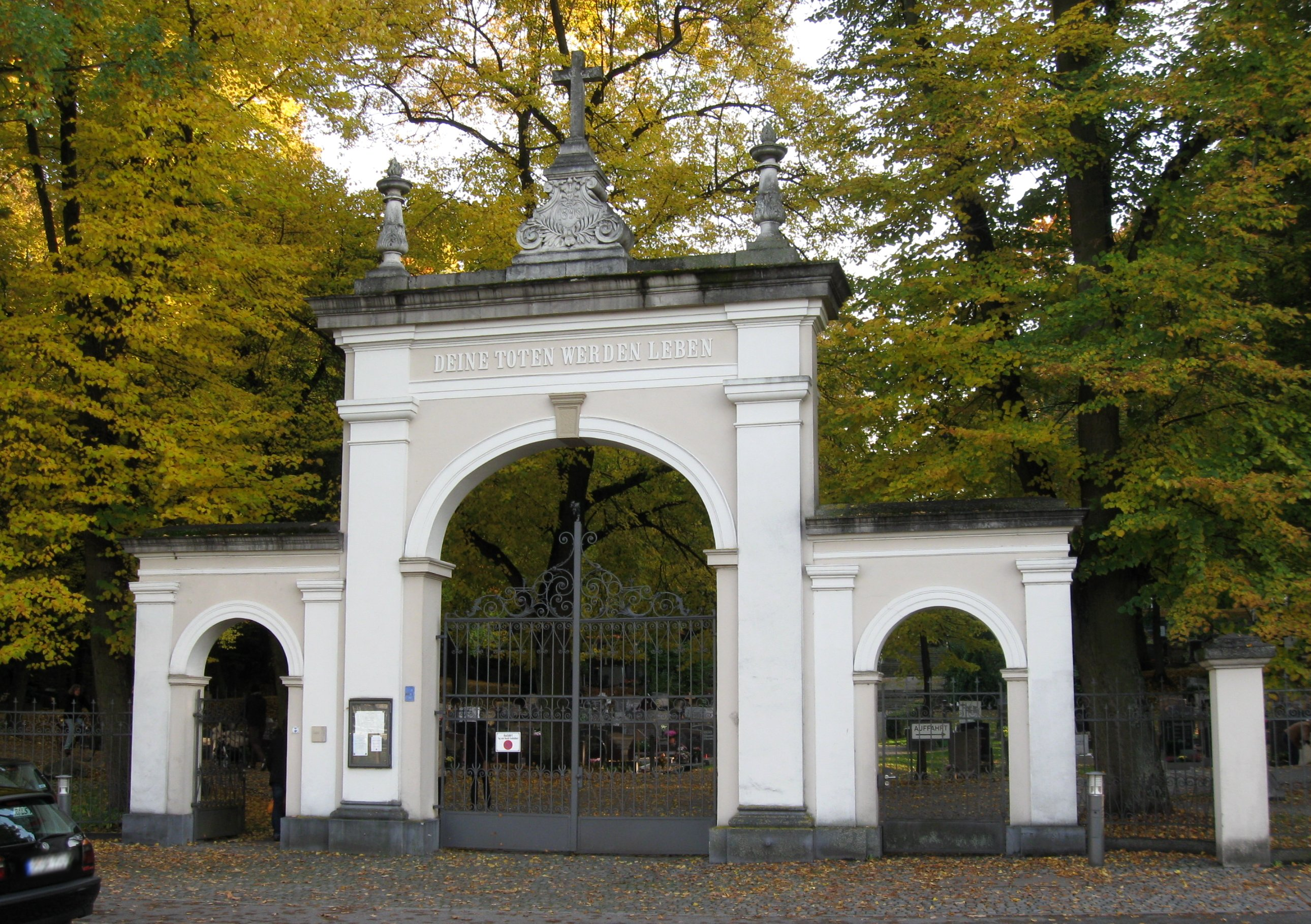
- The northern gate of the cemetery
- Interactive map of Der Evangelische Zentralfriedhof in Regensburg

Details
- Established: 1898
- Location: Regensburg
- Country: Germany
- Coordinates: 49°00′31″N 12°05′45″E
- Type: Protestant cemetery
- Owned by: Evangelical Lutheran Church in Bavaria
- Website: The official website
- Find a Grave: Der Evangelische Zentralfriedhof in Regensburg

The Evangelical Protestant Central Cemetery in Regensburg (German: Der Evangelische Zentralfriedhof in Regensburg) is a historic, church-owned and operated Lutheran cemetery located in the city of Regensburg, in Germany. The cemetery is located on a hillside, on the northern slope of Galgenberg, between Friedensstrasse 12 in the north and Bischof-Konrad-Strasse in the south.

== History and description ==
The Evangelical Protestant Central Cemetery in Regensburg was inaugurated on November 2, 1898. It blends the elements of a rural cemetery in a landscaped park-like setting with a monumental Christian cemetery character. The new central cemetery was the successor to two older non-existent Protestant cemeteries, namely the Lazarus cemetery and St. Peter's cemetery, which were both located near the city wall. To establish a new cemetery catering to all Protestant parishes of Regensburg, the Evangelical Lutheran deanery set up a commission that included Julius Pöverlein and Christian Zinstag as architects and appointed Conrad Mayer as a landscape designer. Some additional requirements from the city had to be taken into account, because part of the cemetery land was to be used as a communal municipal cemetery under the control of the city administration in order to bury the non-religious citizens without any church affiliation and serve as a potter's field for found unidentified decedent as well as suicide burials. The mortuary and a prayer hall were built in the Neo-Renaissance style in 1898. Access to the cemetery is from the north via a three-arched portal designed by German Bestelmeyer, with the Biblical inscription “Your dead shall live” (Isaiah 26:19) above the central arch, topped by a large stone cross. The cemetery was consecrated on November 2, 1898 by Rudolf Woldemar Koch, the Lutheran provost General-Superintendent, and the first burial recorded on the cemetery grounds was Luise Hirschmann, the wife of the stonemason Gottfried Hirschmann, who was also involved in the design of the cemetery. In mid-July 1899, an approximately 10 meters long gigantic crucifix was placed on the cemetery ground which was created by the sculptor Anton Hess. The cemetery houses many ornate mausoleums and family chapels, including the impressive Dörnberg mausoleum, built between 1911 and 1914. The mausoleum is characterized by an exterior staircase flanked by resting lions and a high, steep-arched stone dome with shell limestone cladding based on the Byzantine architecture. Above the portal is the coat of arms of the Von Dörnberg family. In the interior, vaulted by a flat dome painted in Art Nouveau style, is the circular crypt with eight burial chambers. The room is decorated with mosaics and a large Caritas figure, as well as a bust of Ernst von Dörnberg.

== Gallery ==
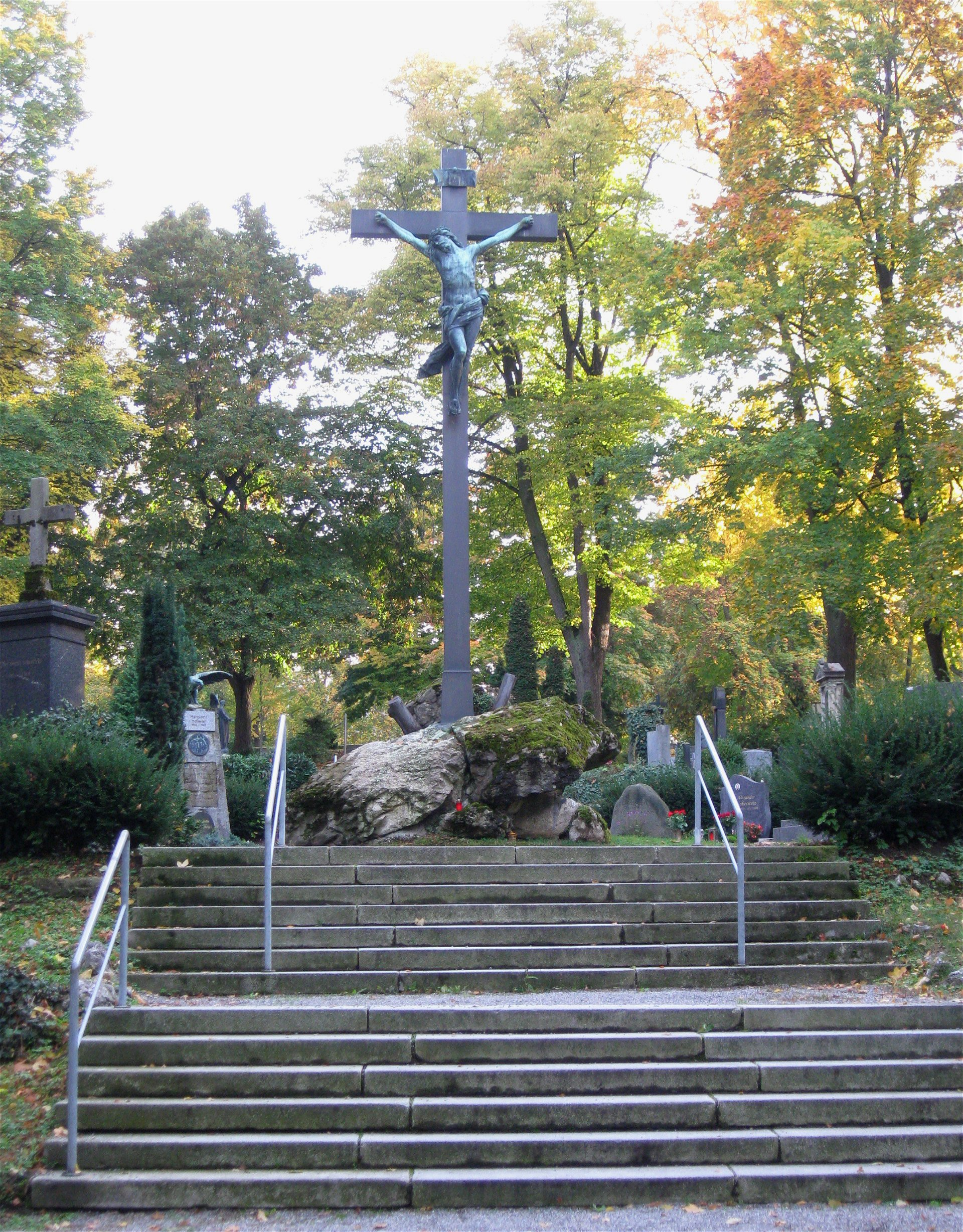
The monumental crucifix created by sculptor Anton Hess on the cemetery ground

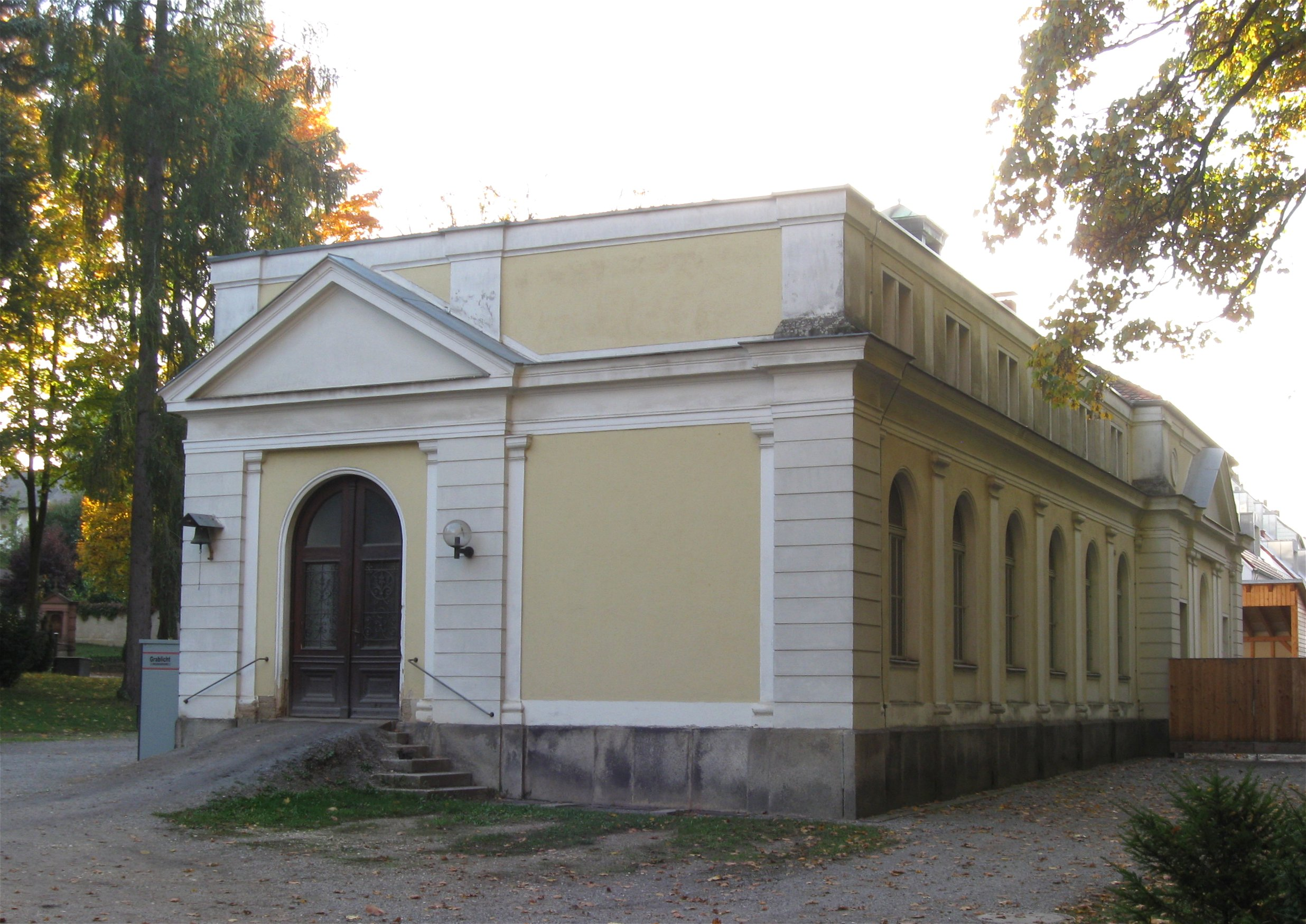
Ceremony hall

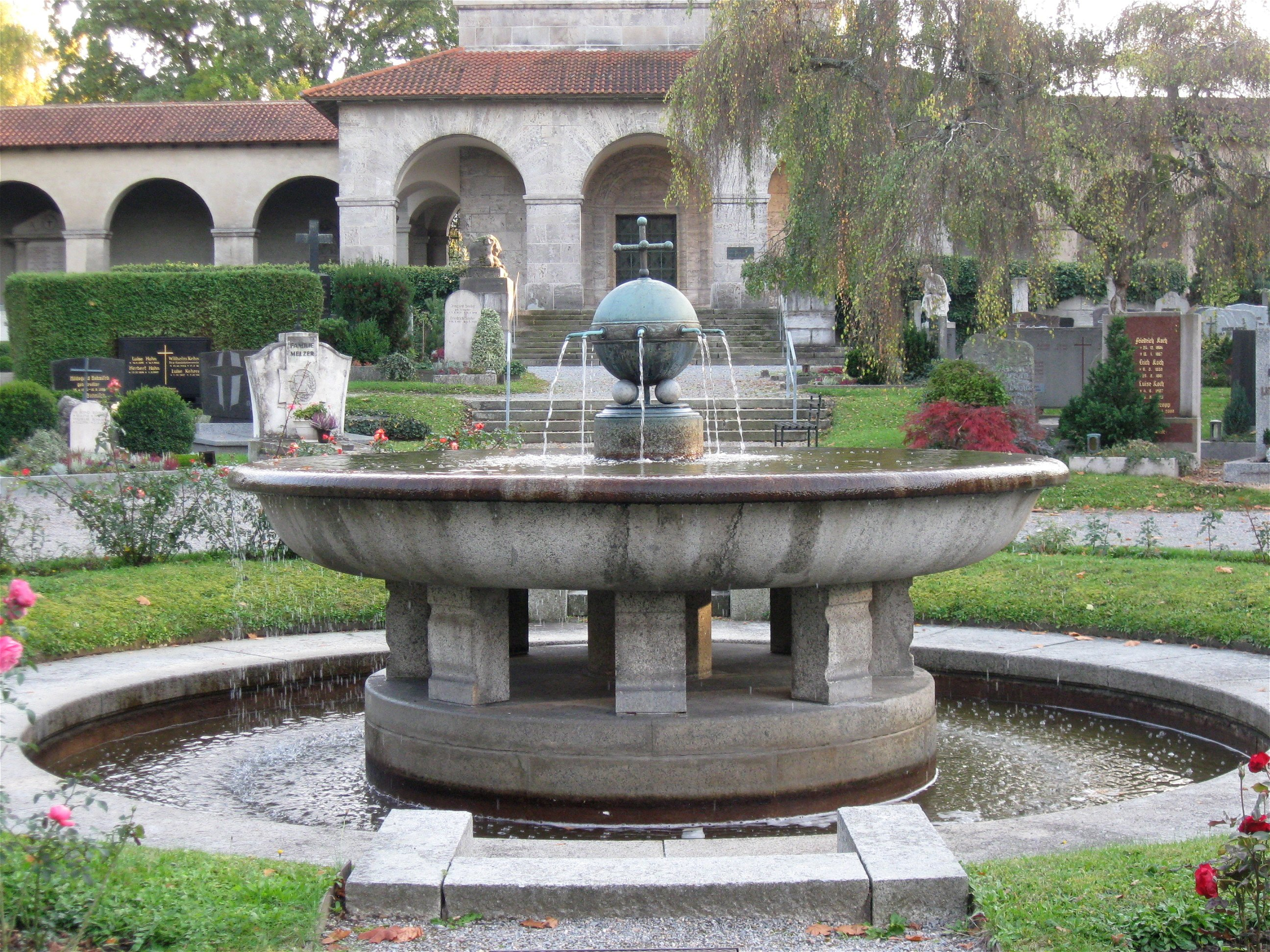
The fountain in front of the Dörnberg Mausoleum

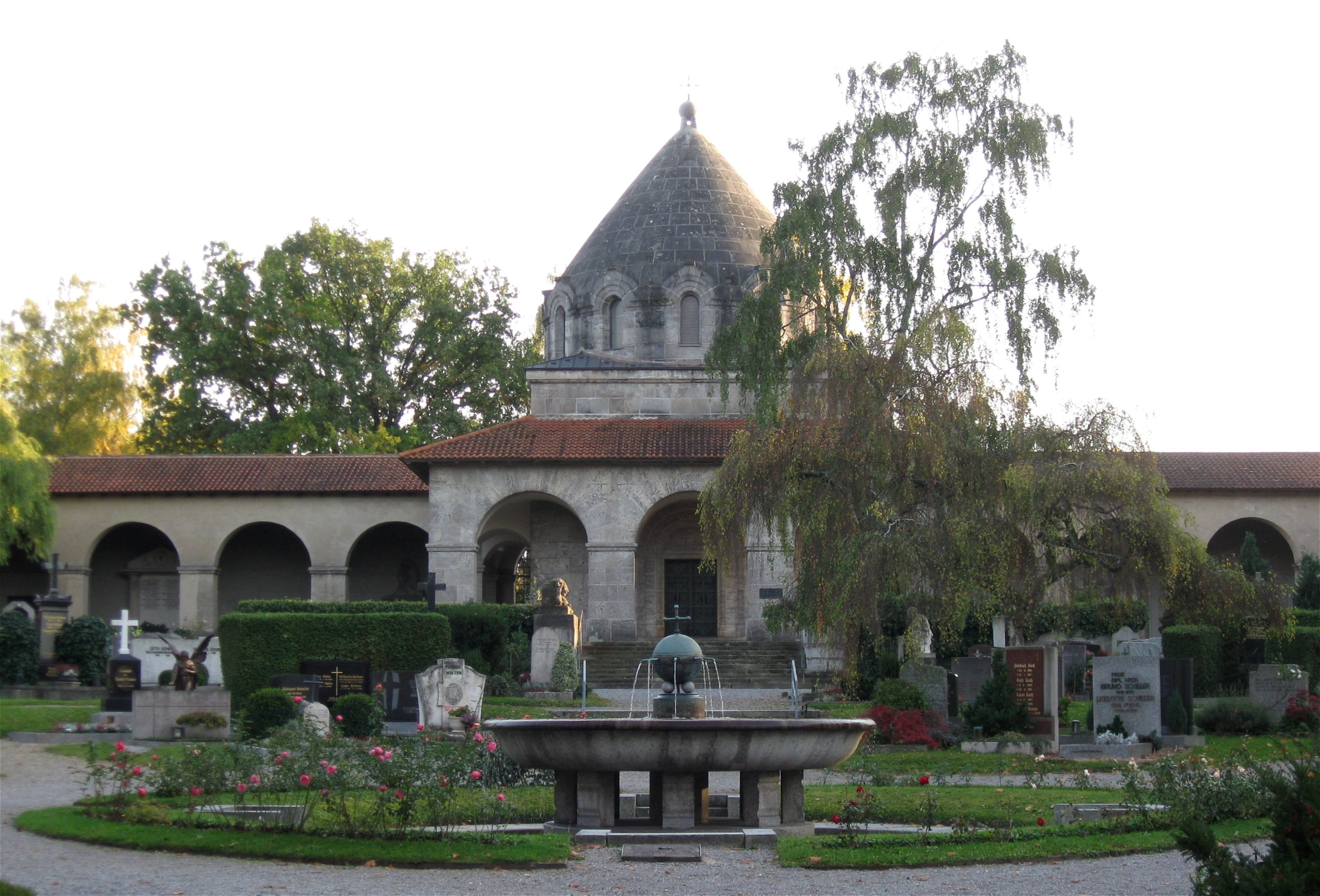

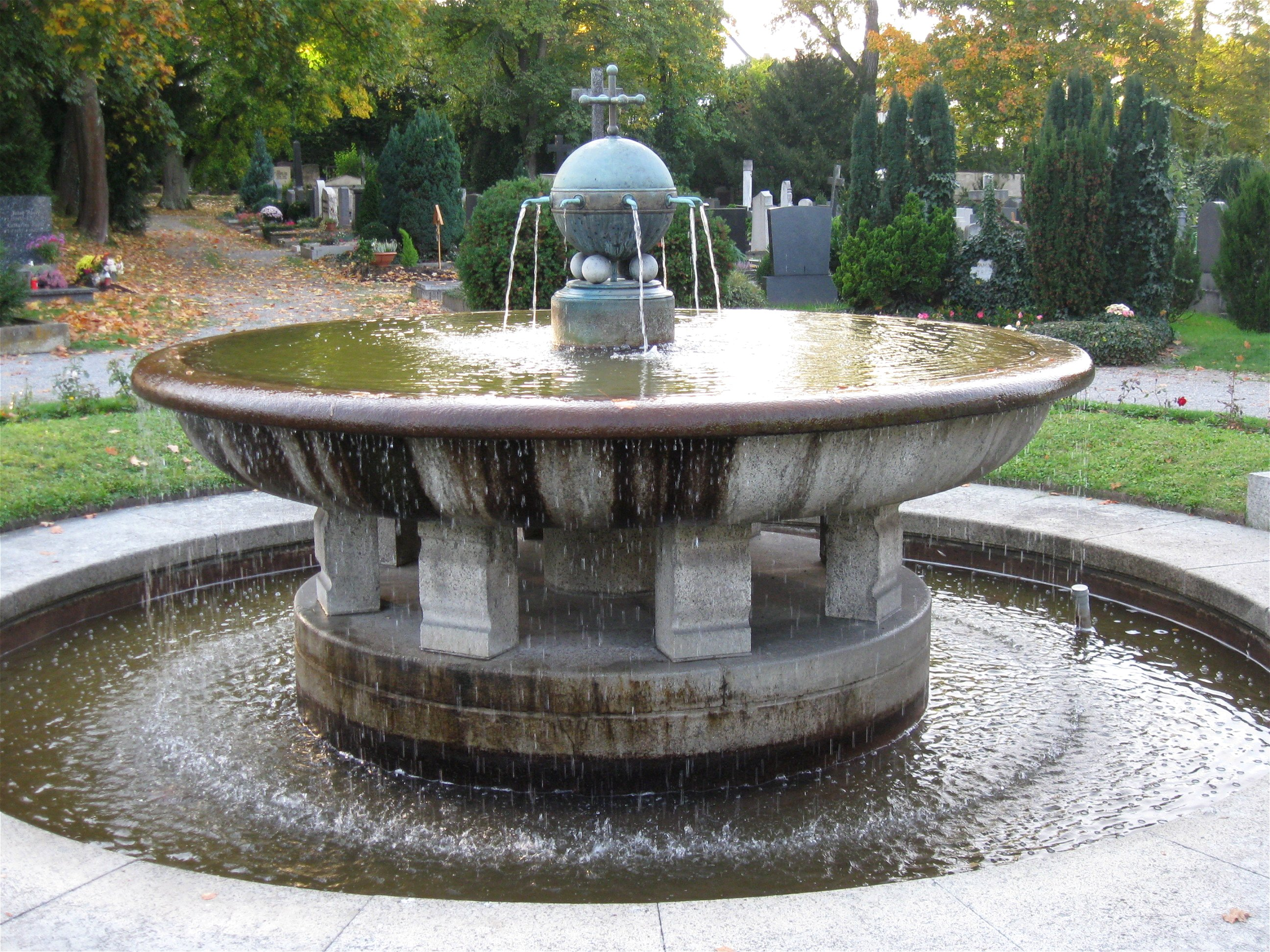

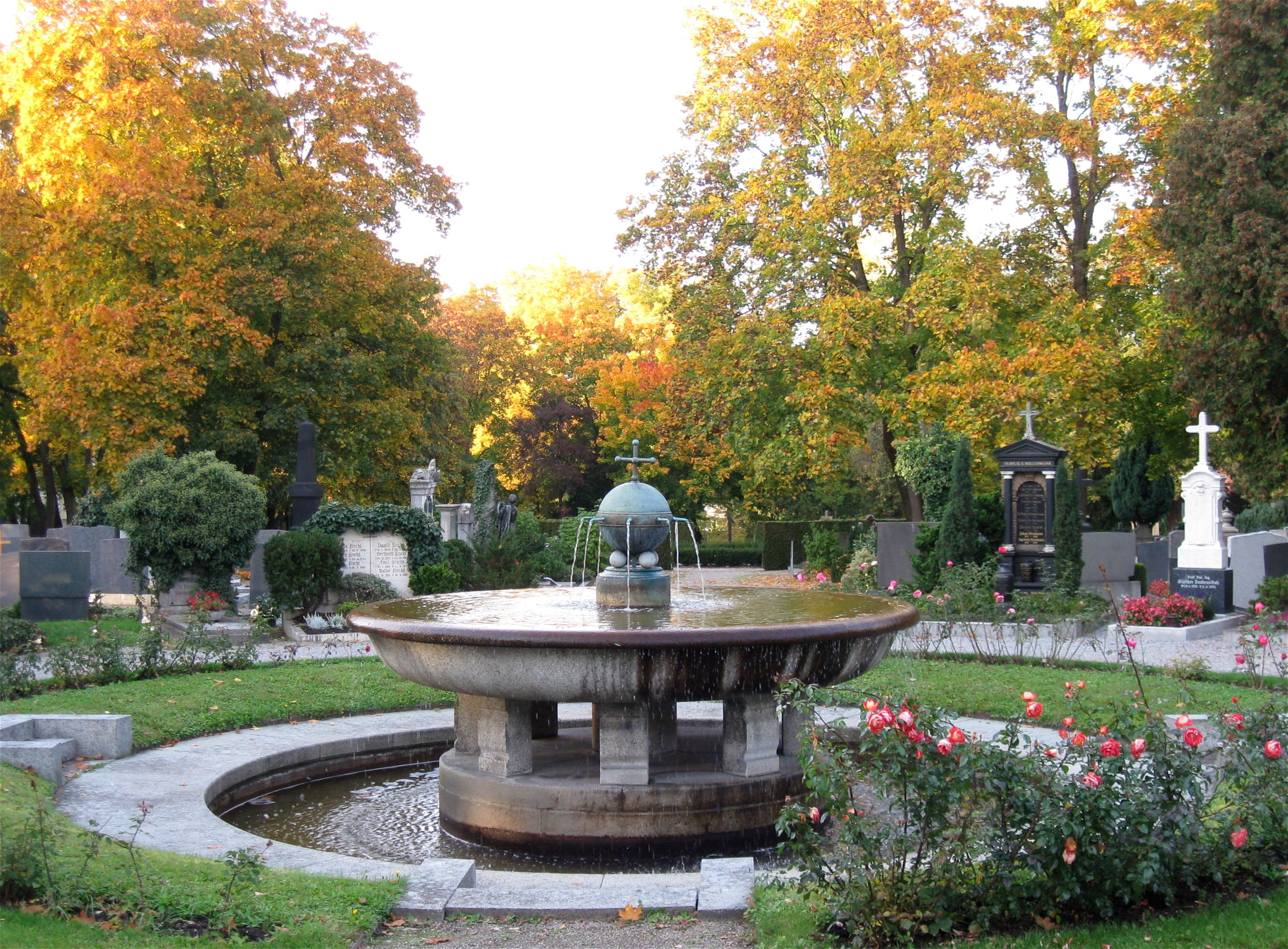

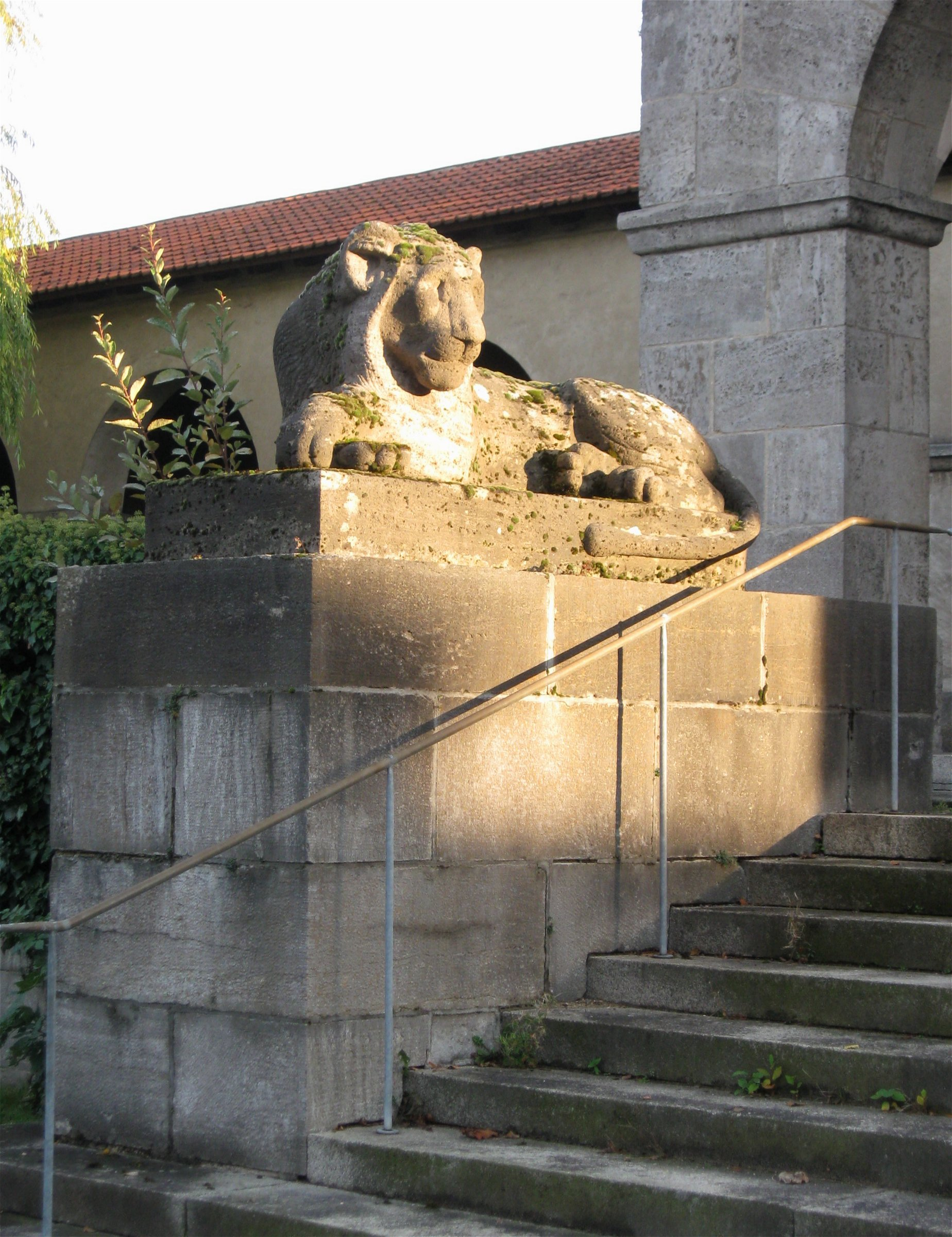

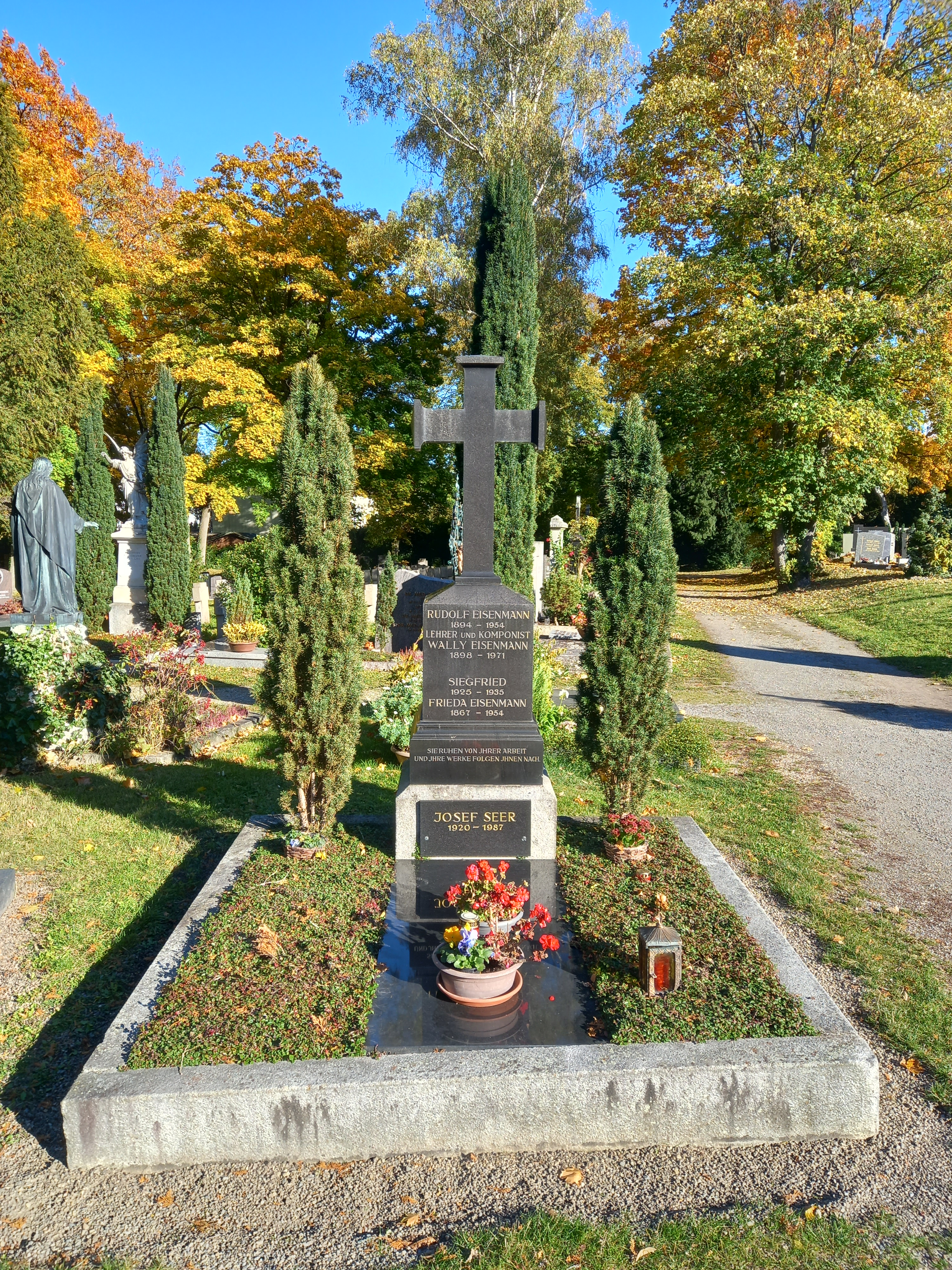

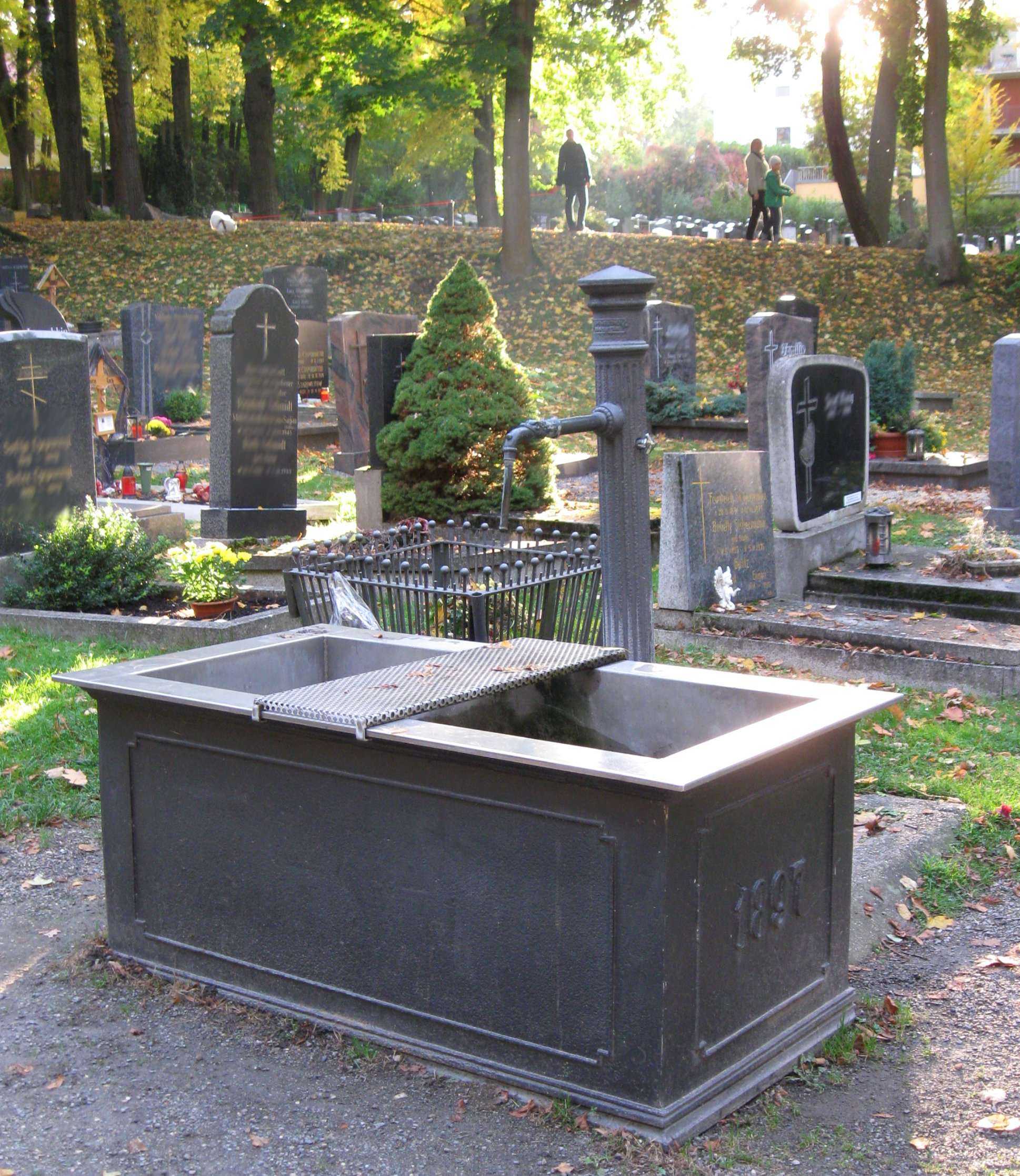

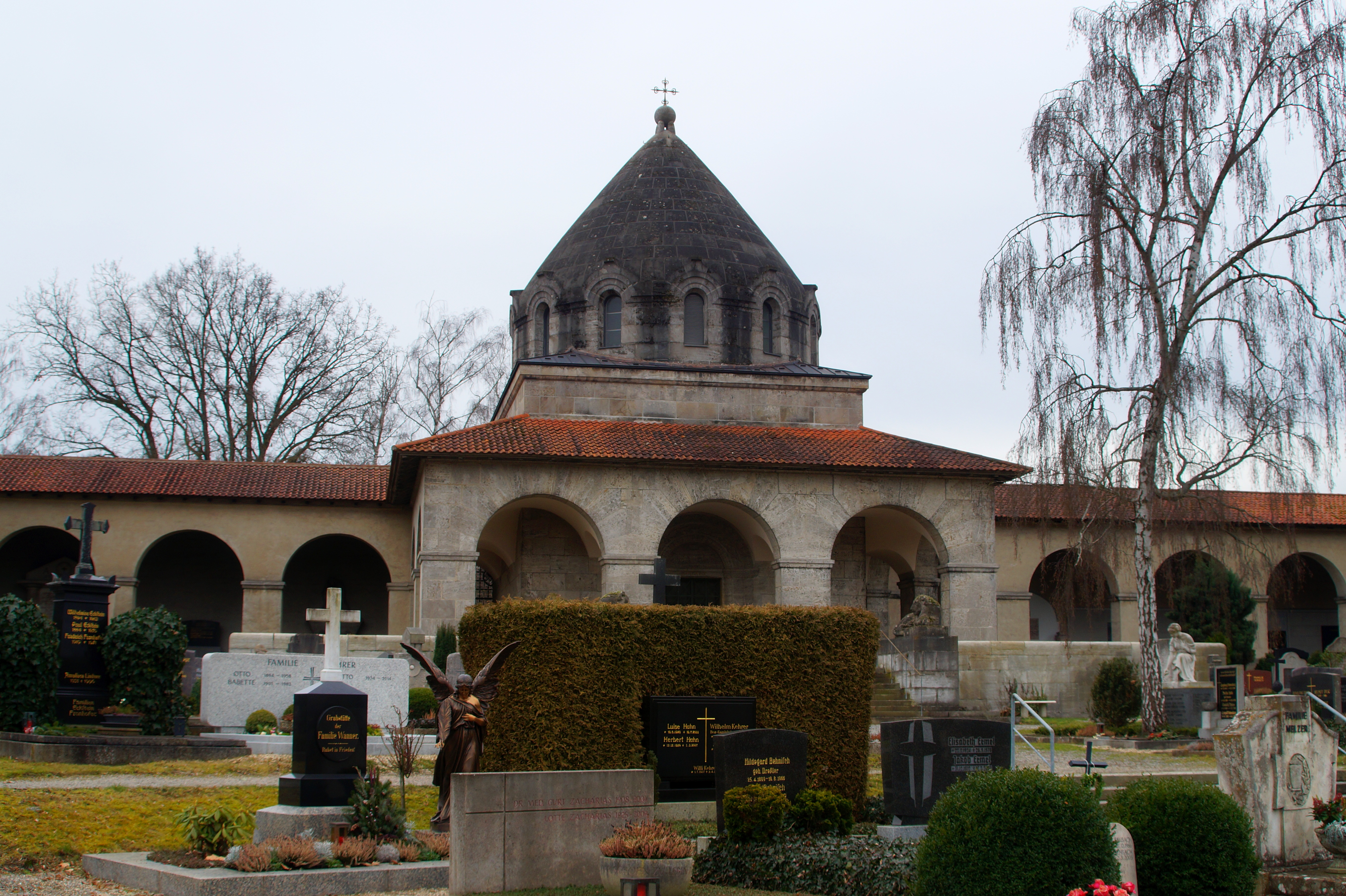

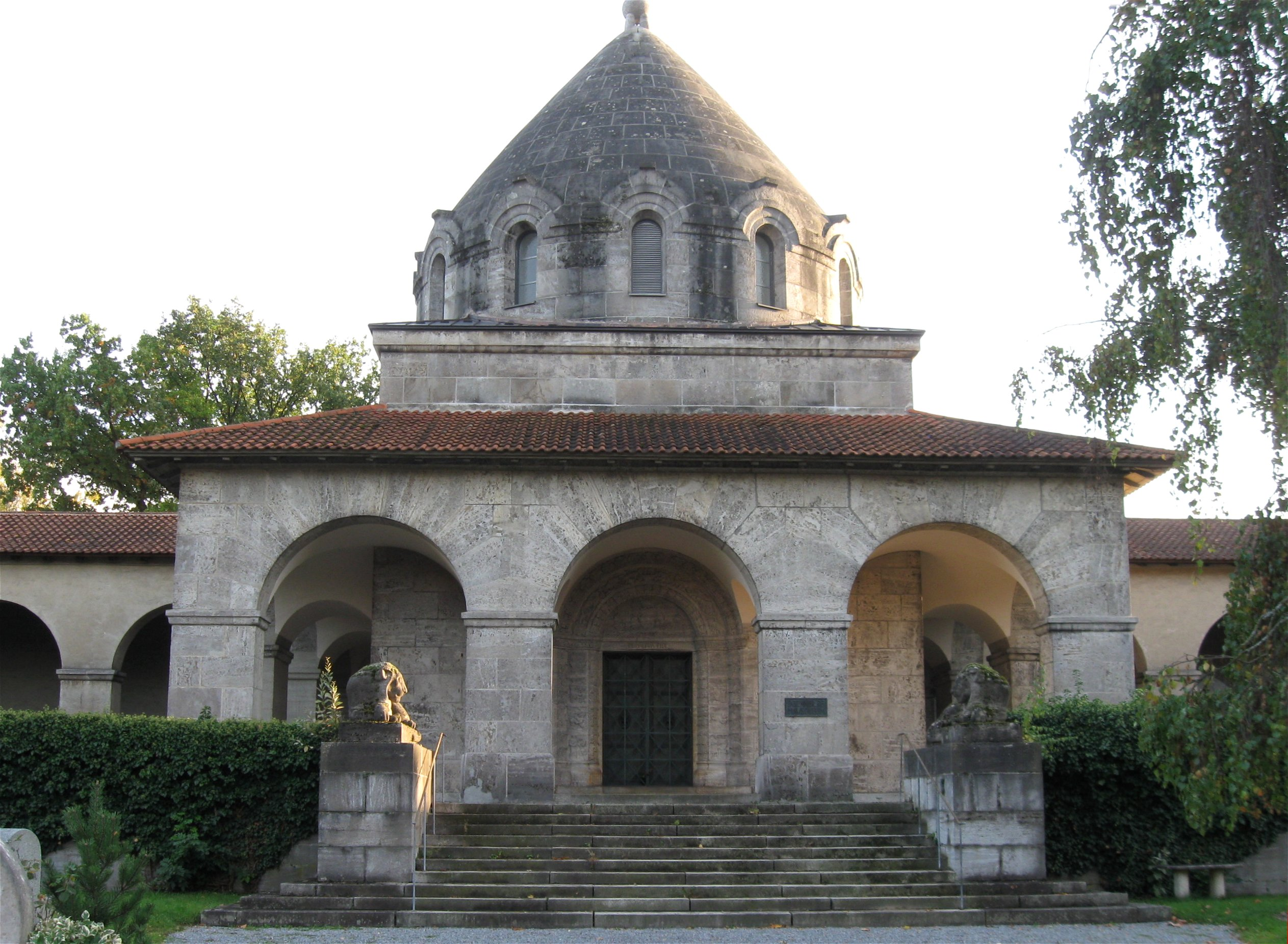

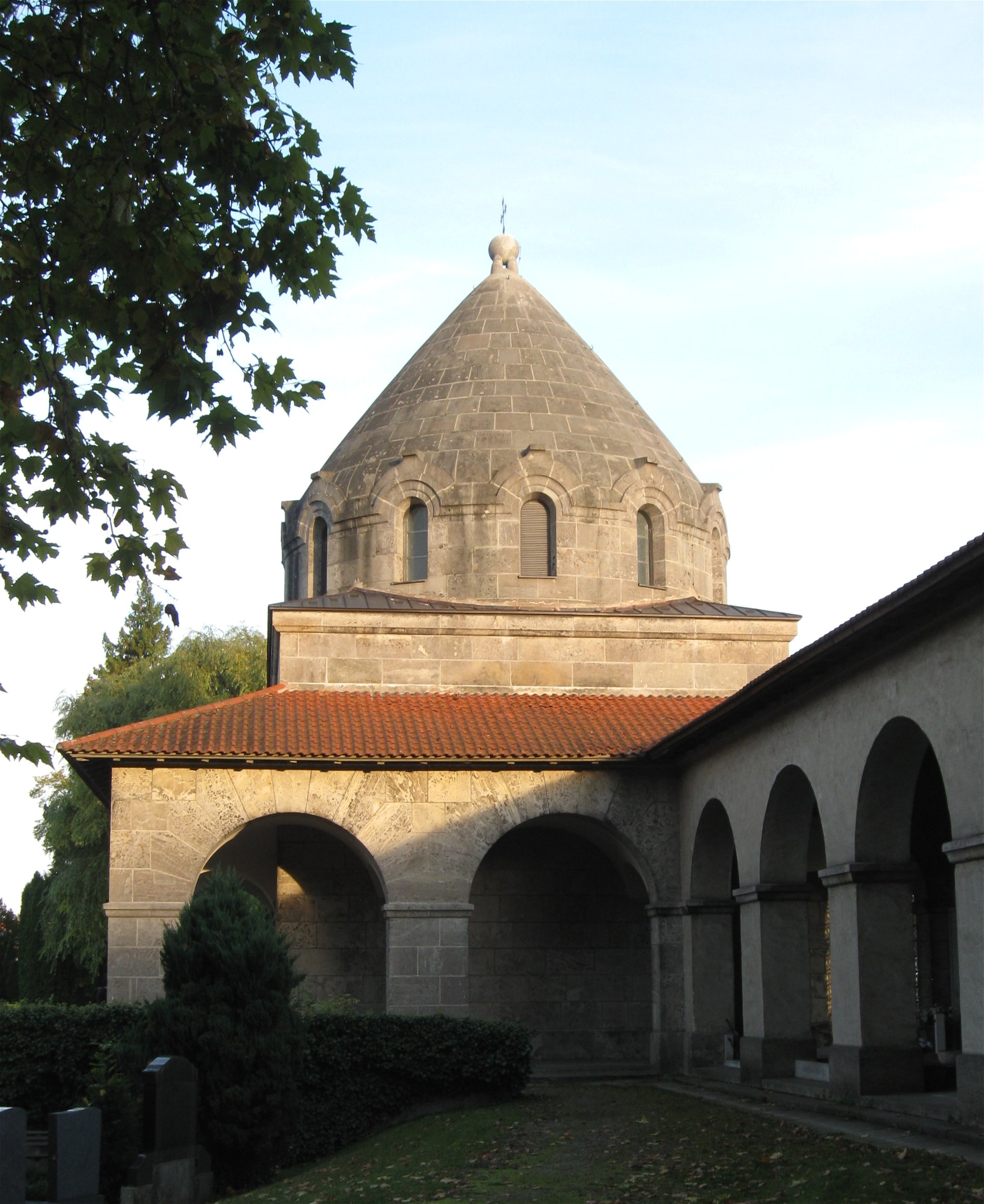

== External links and reference ==
- Regensburg Evangelischer Zentralfriedhof at Find a Grave
- The official website
