= Museum Boerhaave =

Coordinates: 52°09′41″N 4°29′20″E

Rijksmuseum Boerhaave
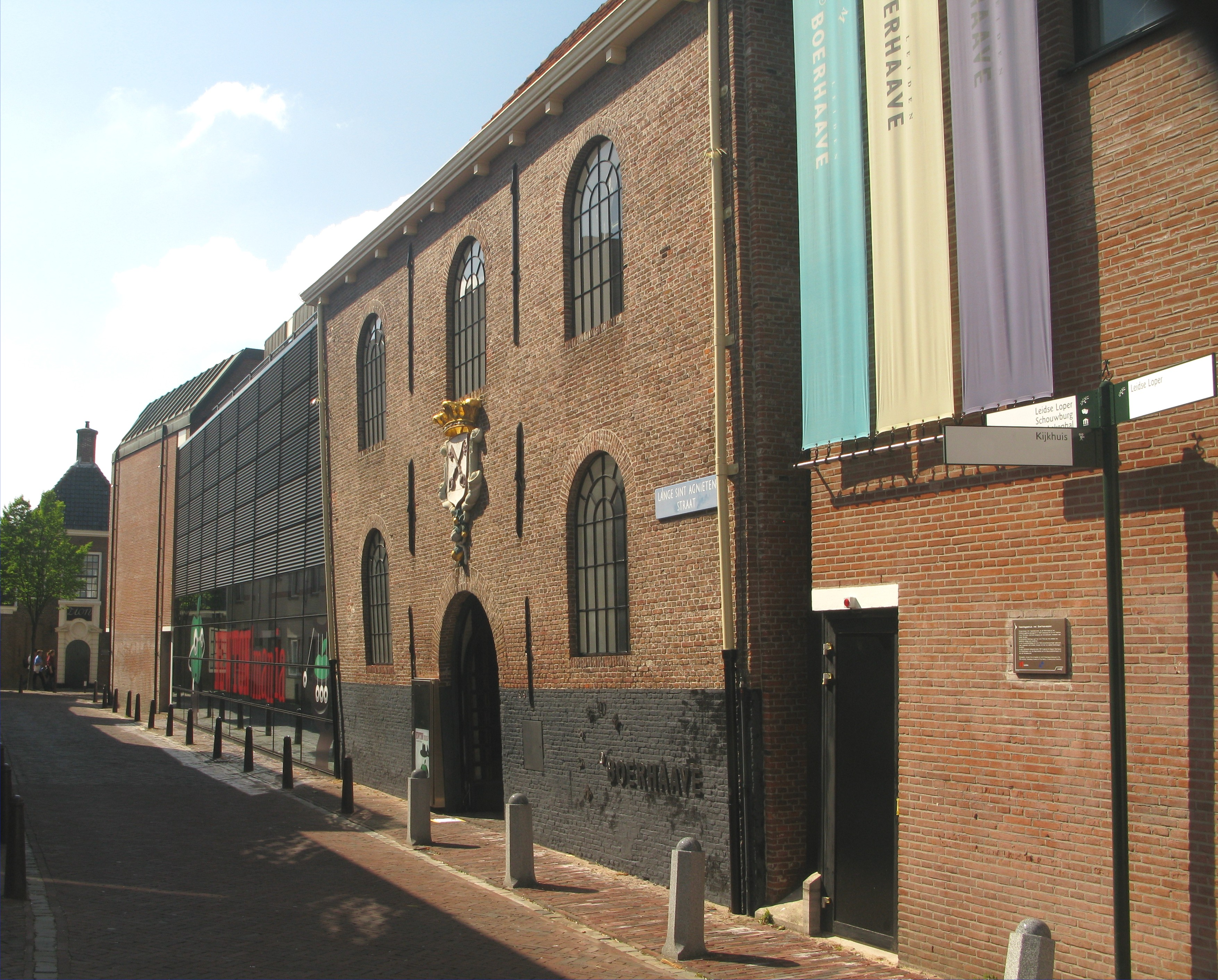
- Entrance of the museum
- Established: 1931
- Location: Lange Sint Agnietenstraat 10; Leiden, Netherlands
- Type: Science Museum
- Collection size: 87,600 objects
- Visitors: 55,000 (2011)
- Director: Dirk VanDelft
- President: Douwe Breimer
- Curator: Hans Hooijmaijers
- Public transit access: Leiden Centraal
- Website: rijksmuseumboerhaave.nl

Rijksmuseum Boerhaave is a museum of the history of science and medicine, based in Leiden, Netherlands. The museum hosts a collection of historical scientific instruments from all disciplines, but mainly from medicine, physics, and astronomy.

The museum is located in a building that was originally a convent in central Leiden. It includes a reconstructed traditional anatomical theatre. It also has many galleries that include the apparatus with which Heike Kamerlingh Onnes first liquefied helium (in Leiden), the electromagnet equipment used by Wander Johannes de Haas (a Leiden physicist) for his low-temperature research, and an example of the Leiden jar, among many other objects in the extensive collection.

The museum is named after Herman Boerhaave, a Dutch physician and botanist who was famous in Europe for his teaching at Leiden and lived to a great age, receiving brilliant students from all over Europe, including Peter the Great, Voltaire and Linnaeus.

== History ==
Boerhaave Museum's history began in 1907, when a Historical Exhibition of Natural Science and Medicine was held in the Academy Building of Leiden University. The many objects in the exhibition came from all the learned corners of the country. It was a great success and there were immediately calls to set up a permanent science history exhibit.

In 1928 a foundation was initiated by physicist Claude August Crommelin, who worked at Leiden university, for a museum for the history of natural sciences. The aim of the museum was described in the preliminary statutes of the foundation: "the collection of instruments, tools, slides and specimens, documents and other objects, which are important for the history of the natural sciences; to look after these objects, describe them and keep them in a museum which is to be located in Leiden". The sciences to be represented included: Astronomy, Physics, Chemistry, Botany, Zoology, Pharmacy, all medical sciences – including Physiology, Anatomy et cetera, and Mathematics.

In 1931 the museum opened as "The Dutch Historical Museum of the Natural Sciences" (Het Nederlandsch Historisch Natuurwetenschappelijk Museum). To the view of Crommelin, the museum was to become a national museum: the 's Gravesande-Musschenbroek collection would form the starting point, to which collections from other institutes were to be added.

In 1947 the museum, which was in fact a private foundation, became formally a national museum. It was renamed to "The Dutch National Museum for the History of the Natural Sciences" (Rijksmuseum voor de Geschiedenis van Natuurwetenschappen). An advisory board was installed in which members of Dutch universities would take seat. It underlined the ambition to become a national museum, not a museum solely connected to the Leiden University.

Before moving in 1991, the museum was located in the former Boerhaave Laboratory at the Steenstraat 1, Leiden, a building which belonged to the Leiden Academic Hospital (Leiden Academisch Hospital), now part of LUMC, Leiden University Medical Center. This location of the museum now houses the National Museum of Ethnology.

To create better housing the former nunnery of Saint Cecilia was bought by the Government Buildings Agency (Rijksgebouwendienst). This historic building has had various functions over time. The building dates from the early 15th century. The building had become municipal property after the Protestant Reformation and shortly before 1600 was converted into a pest house and lunatic asylum. The Leiden Academic hospital was founded in this location between 1636 and 1639. In 1967, with the prospect of a new location the name of the museum was changed to "Museum Boerhaave". However, it took more than twenty years before the museum finally moved. After extensive restoration and expansion, the building is in use as a museum since 1991.

Rijksmuseum Boerhaave was elected European Museum of the Year 2019. Founded in 1977, this is the oldest and most prestigious museum award in Europe. The international jury praised the completely renewed science and medicine museum in Leiden: "The exceptional public quality of this museum results from its artful approach to communicating science. Important and beautiful objects are interpreted using the latest technologies and the personal stories of those driven by a passion for the pursuit of knowledge. The result is science with a human face, inspiring curiosity and amazement as well as engaging a wide public in debates on important scientific and ethical questions issues of our time."

== Collection ==
The Boerhaave Museum is running a project to document approx. 3000 objects in its collection online, with pictures and descriptions for every single object. In April 2010 the site featured over 1750 objects, ordered by room and showcase. This overview is in large part based on the museum's online documentation.

The museum has 25 galleries, which are by and large organised chronologically, with thematical subgroupings per gallery.

=== 16th–17th century ===
0 Museum Foyer

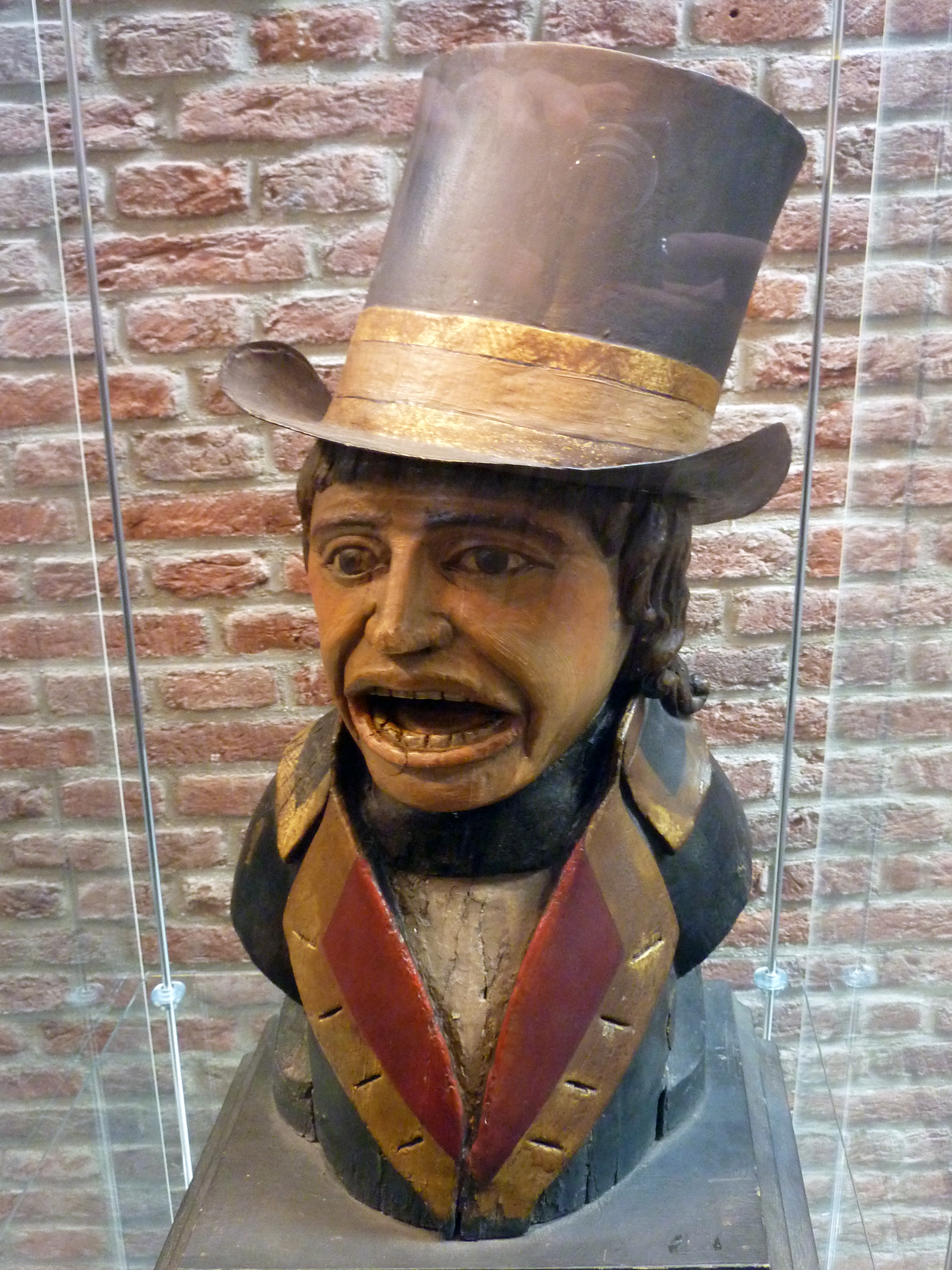
Gaper

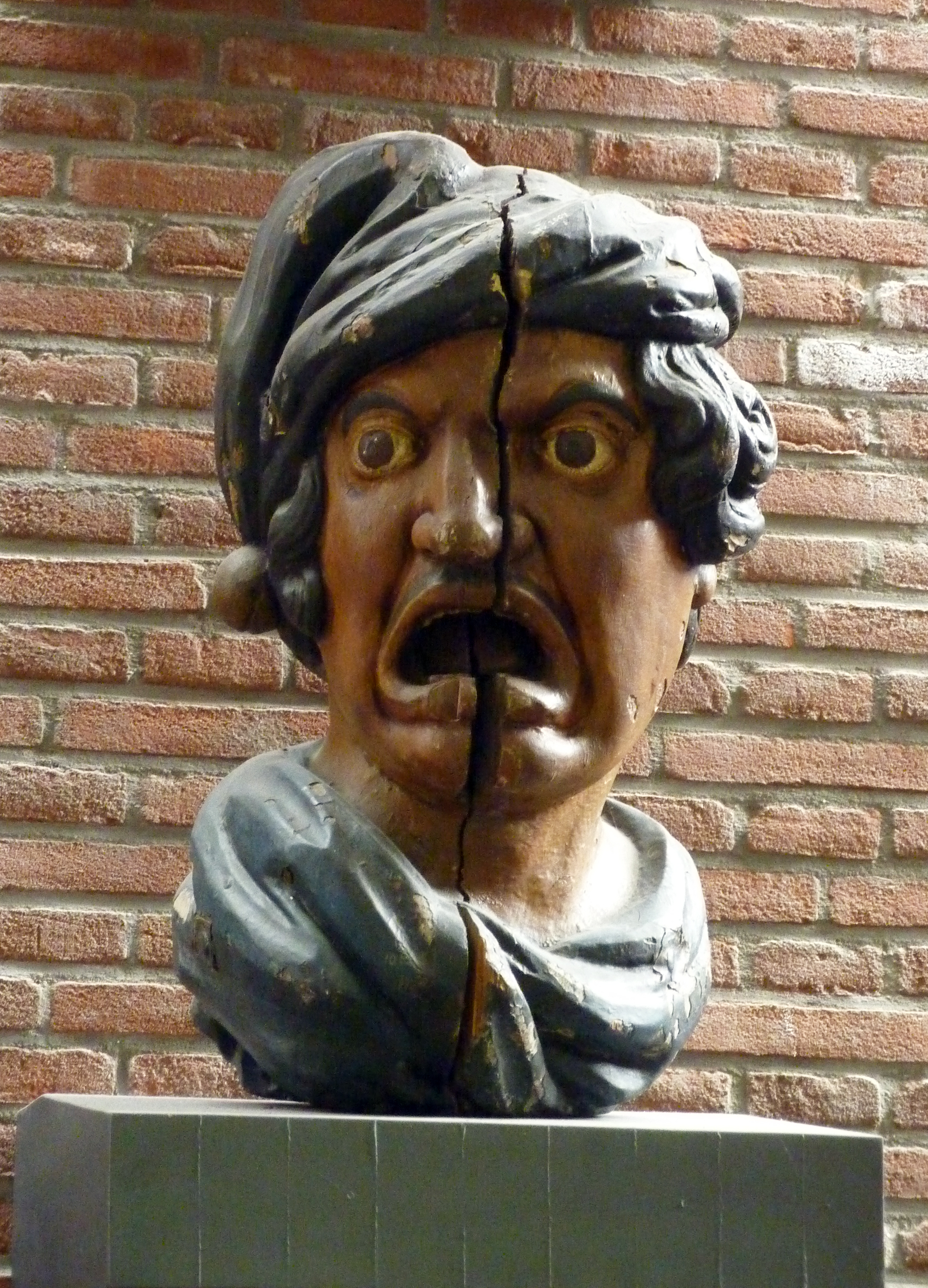
Gaper

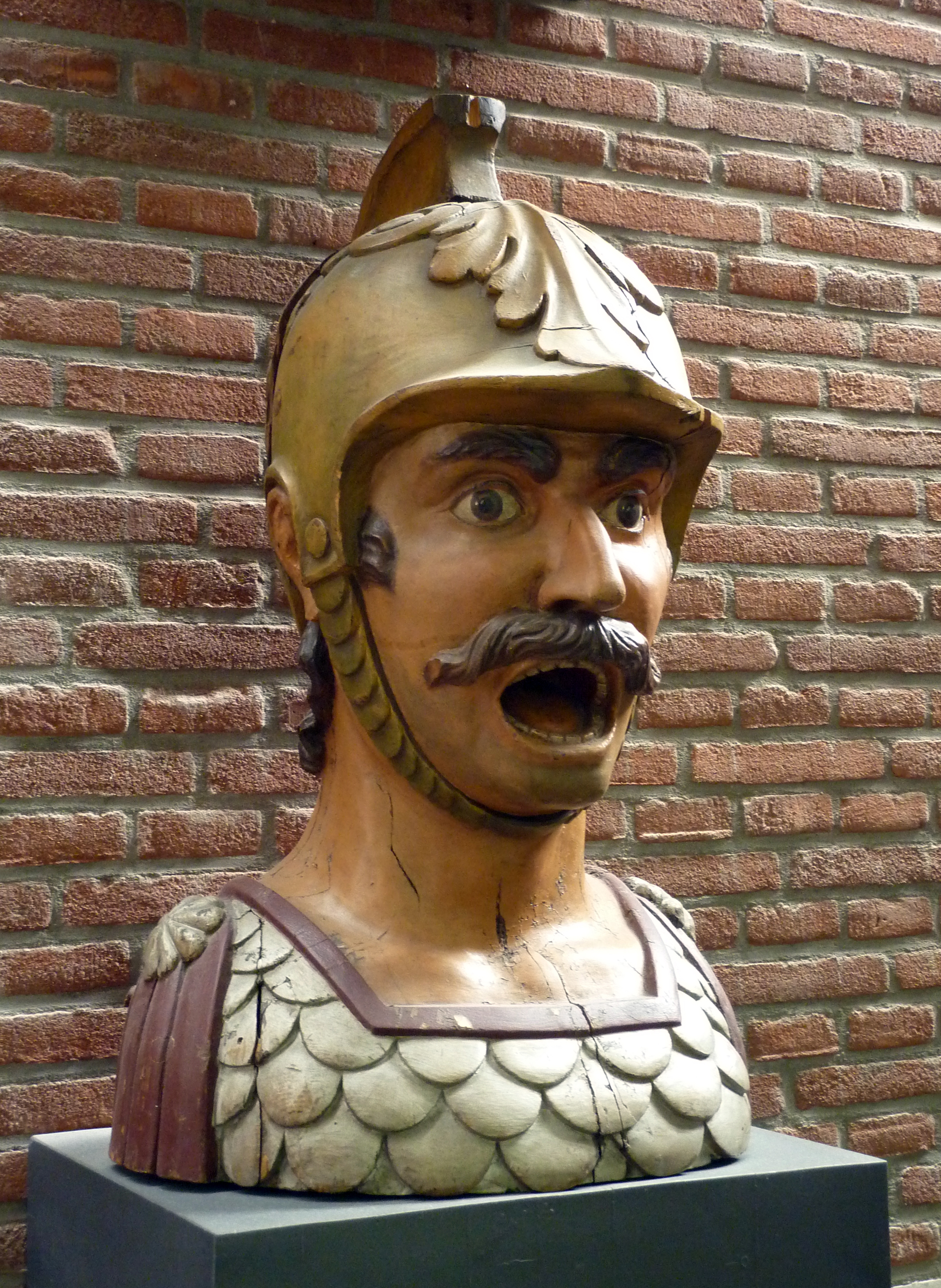
Gaper

Gapers (wooden heads miming the swallowing of pills) and other shop signs for pharmacies and druggists. Also a 'dictionary of health': a tall book-shaped wooden chest (1660) filled with simples (basic substances used in medicine).

1 Leiden Anatomical Theater

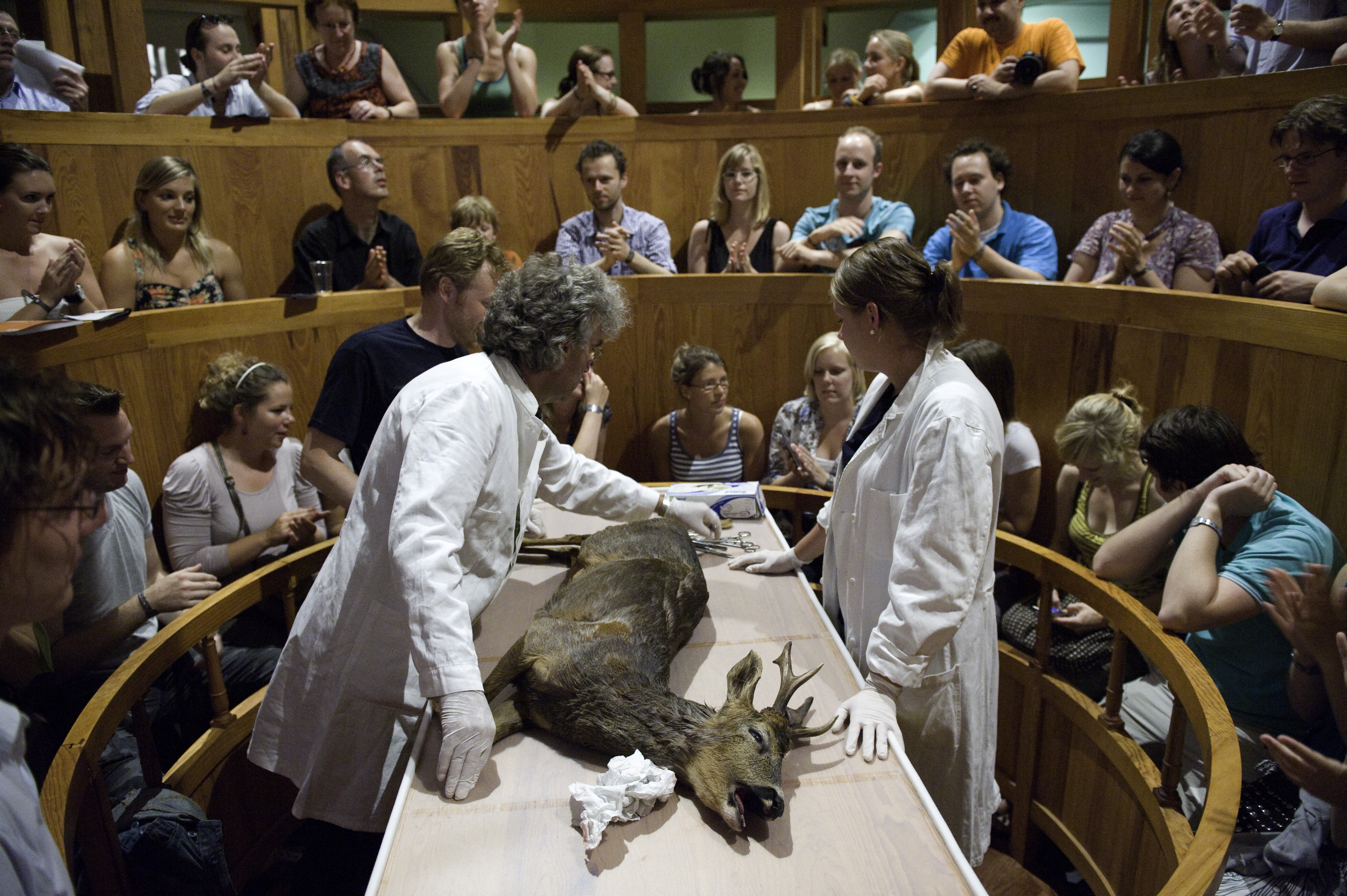
Dissection of a roe deer during the 2nd Leiden Museum Night in the Anatomical Theatre by an animal taxidermist with assistants from Naturalis. The deer had died earlier in a road accident.

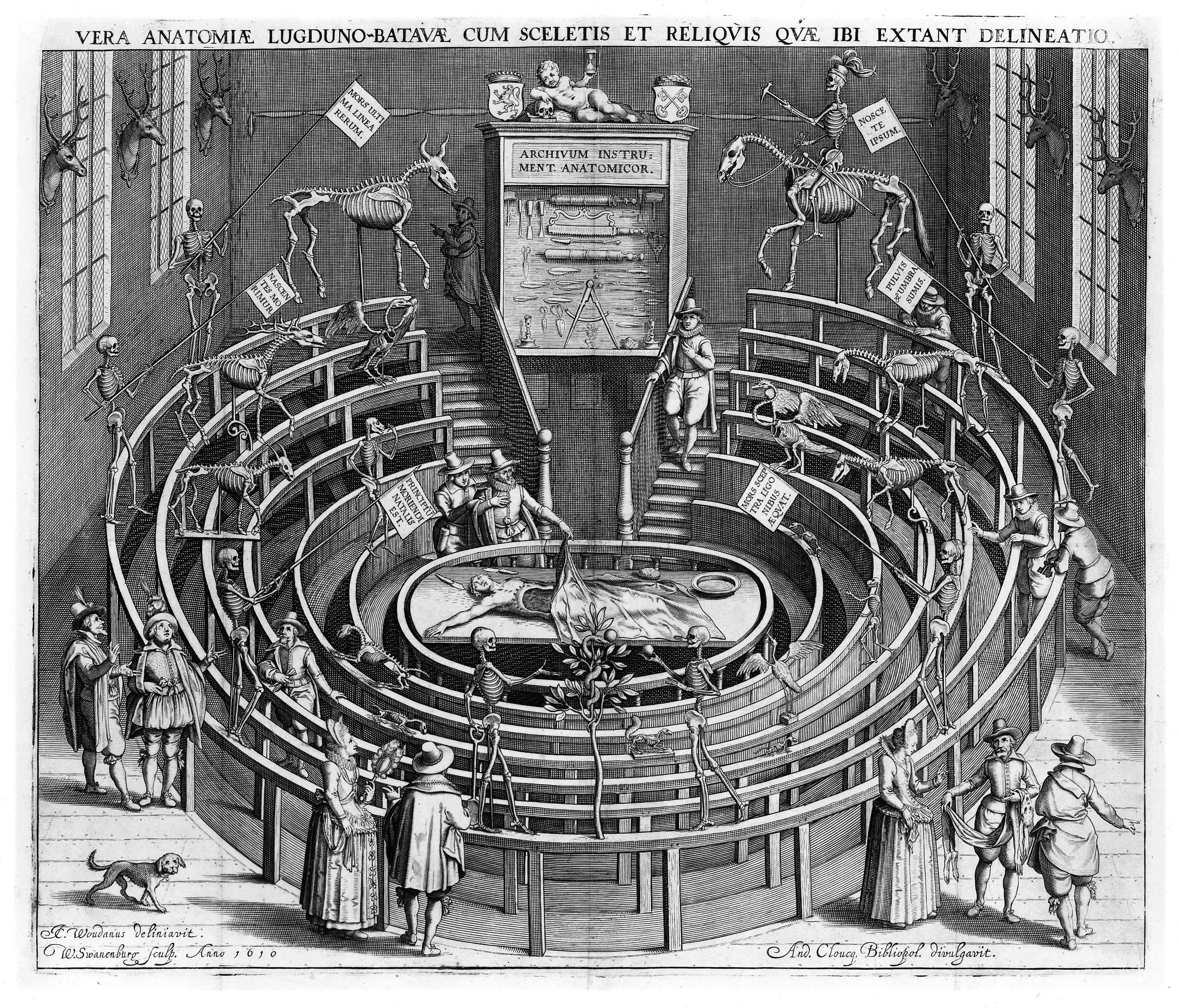
The anatomical theatre at Leiden University in the early 17th century

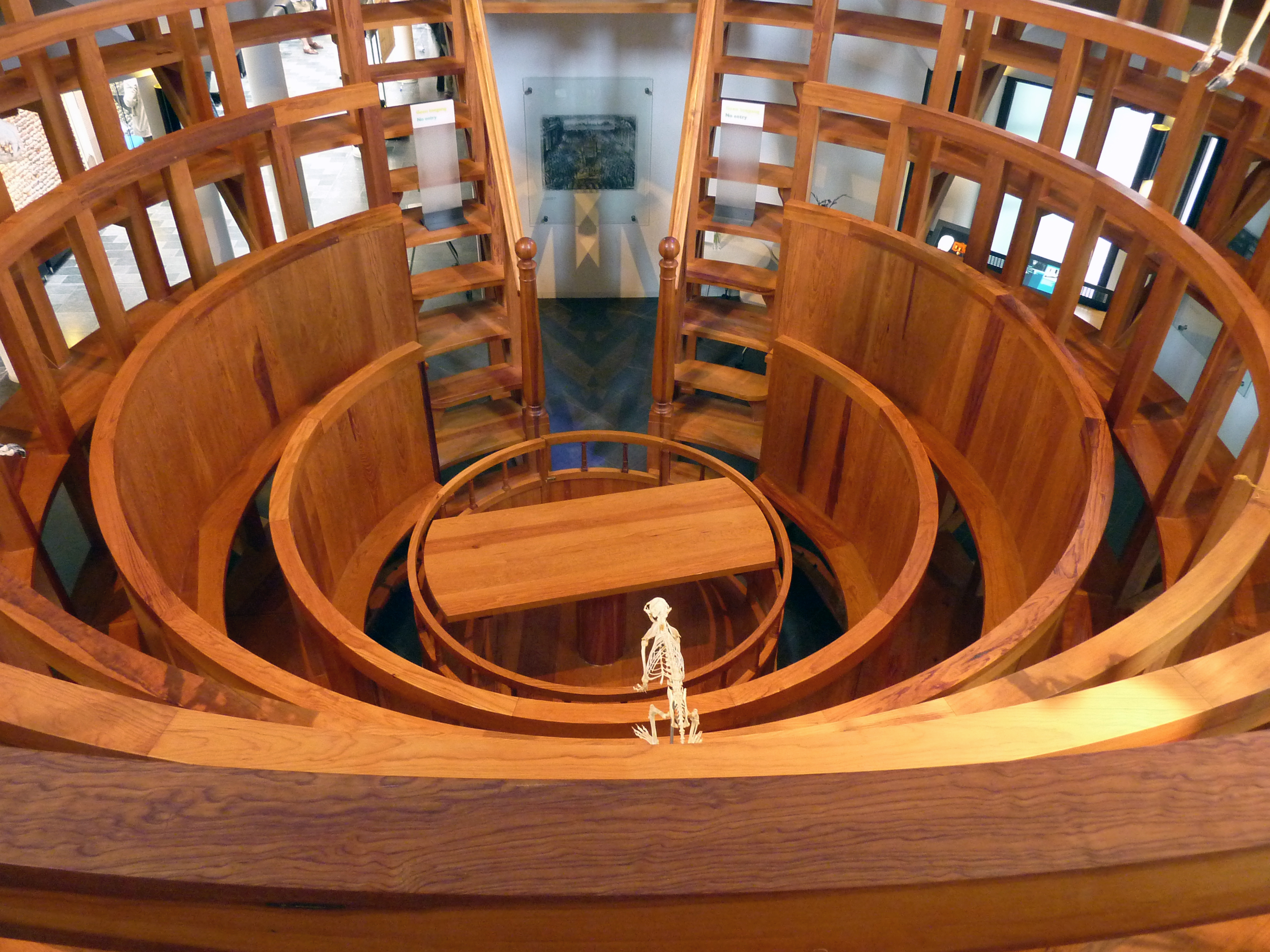
Reconstruction of the anatomical theatre (1988)

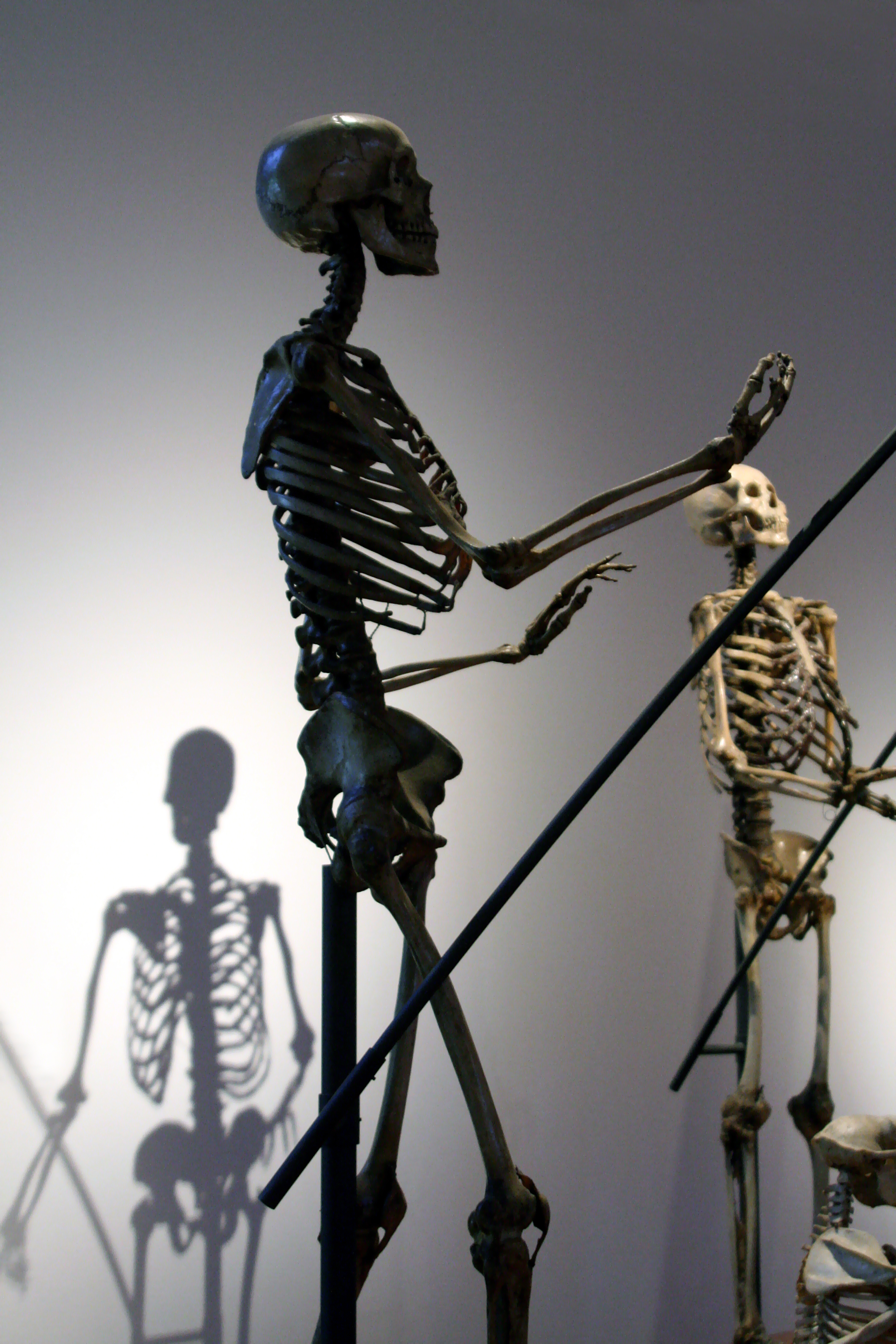
Skeletons around Anatomical Theatre

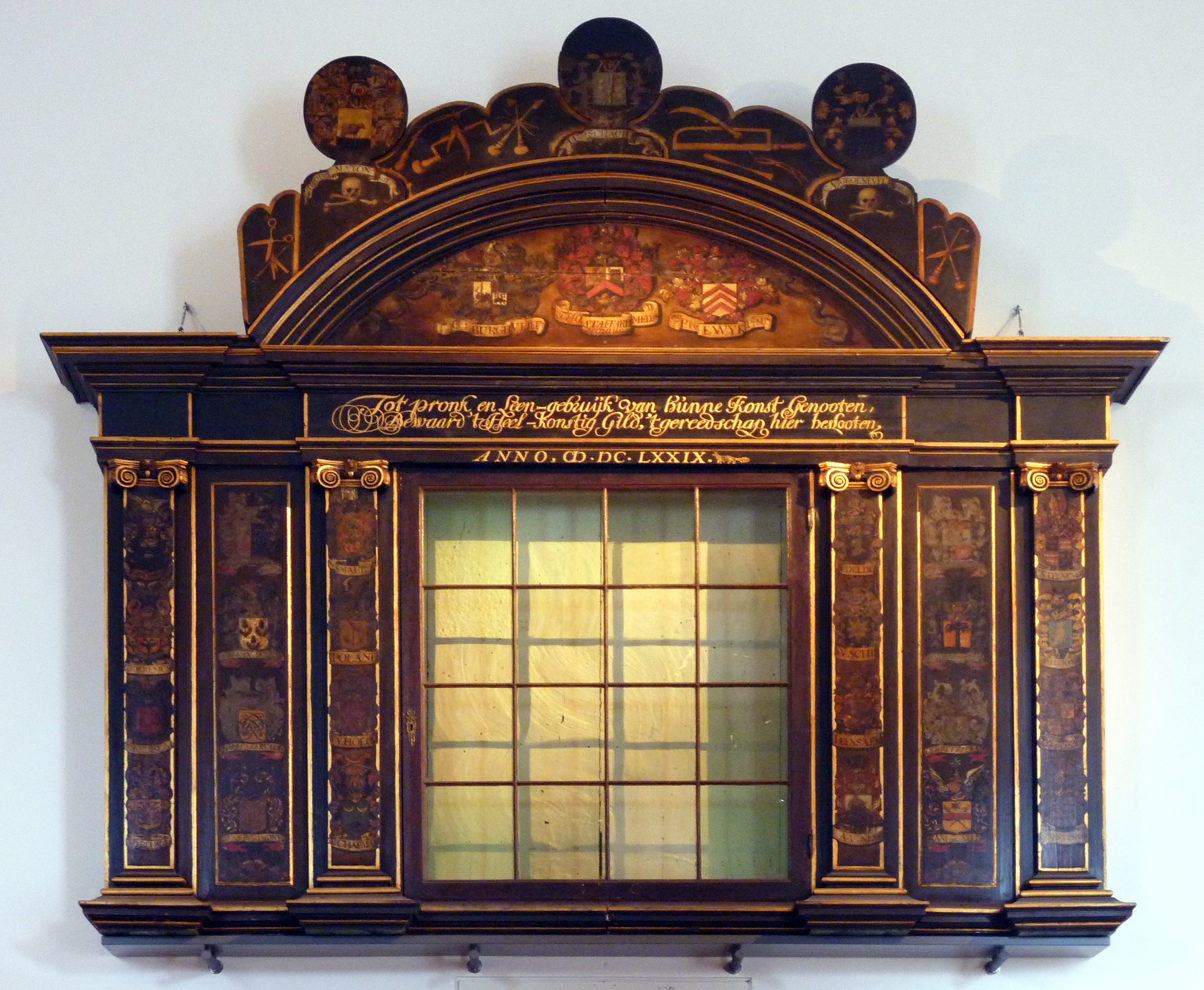
Surgeons instrument chest used by the Leiden surgeons’ guild and decorated with the coats-of-arms of board members

The room shows a reconstruction (1988) of the Theatrum Anatomicum (anatomical theatre) (built 1596). A richly decorated instrument chest (1670) which belonged to the Leiden surgeon's guild. A small collection of objects (largely Egyptian antiquities) that survived from the now gone Leiden Theatrum (one of the oldest museums of Europe) are shown as well. On the wall three paintings: one depicting the magistrates of the Catharina and Caecilia Hospitals (the latter now houses the museum), a second showing a Prussian peasant from whom a 10-inch sword, swallowed in a drinking bout, has surgically been removed, a third showing renowned surgeon and designer of medical instruments Cornelis Solingen (1680). One of Solingen's inventions (part of the collection) was a screw to unindent a soldiers skull who had been hit by a bullet. Often in those days bullets did not fully penetrate a skull, merely deformed it.

2 Drawn from life

The Doctor as the Devil

Four large allegoric paintings (± 1610) show in stages how the appreciation of a patient for his physician declines, from being a true savior (Christ) when the illness is at its height to being a devil when the bill is delivered. Three solid figures of Saints Cosmas and Damian, patrons of doctors and pharmacists.

Six anatomical books and drawings (1520–1570) and six books on herbs (1480–1590) testify how in the Renaissance there was an urge to study life diligently and not take traditional beliefs for granted. A large collection of baked and painted apothecary jars (1550–1650) and (often ornamented) cast-iron and bronze mortars (1350–1700).

3 The Golden Age

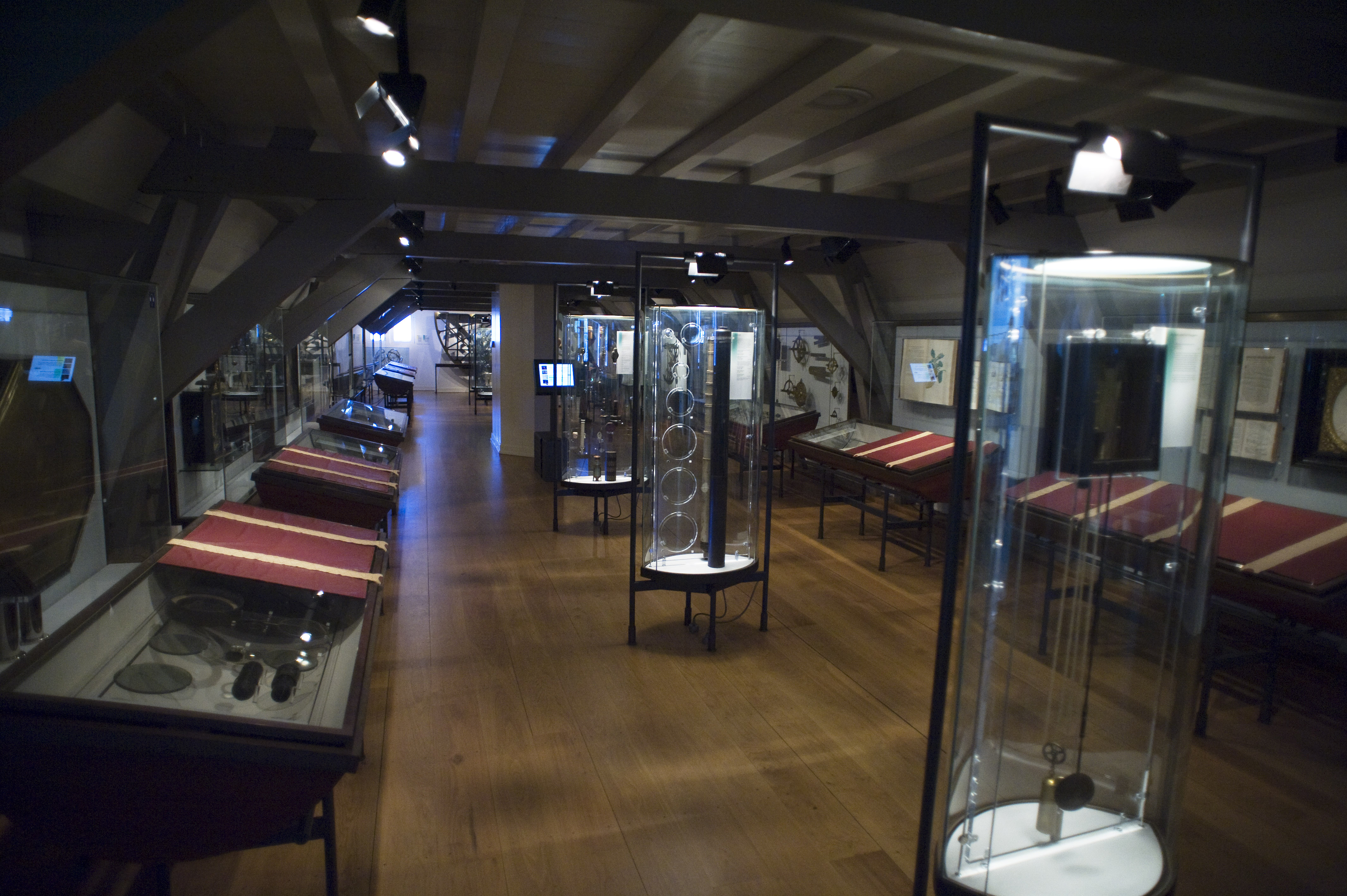
Room 3: The Golden Age

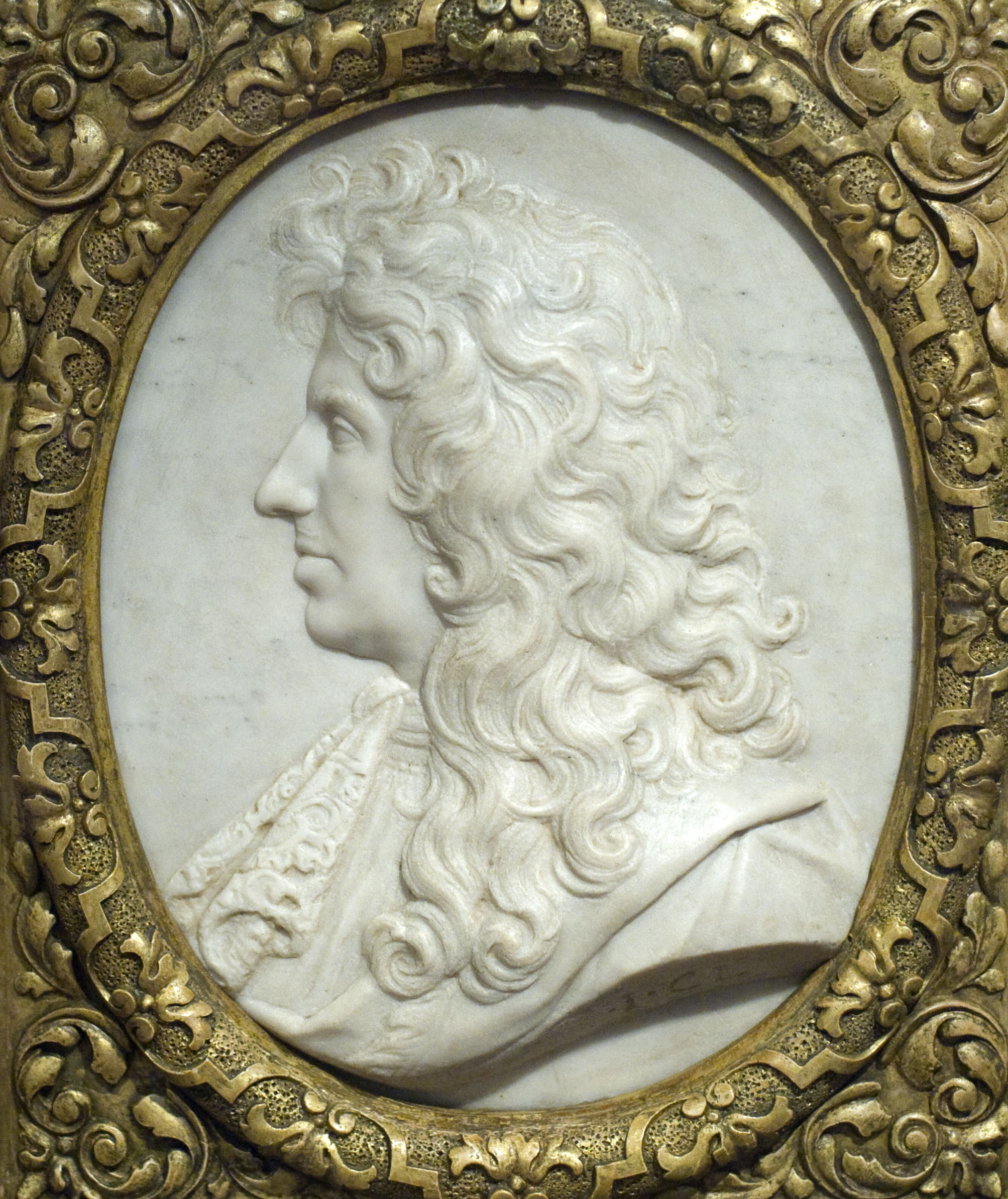
Christiaan Huygens

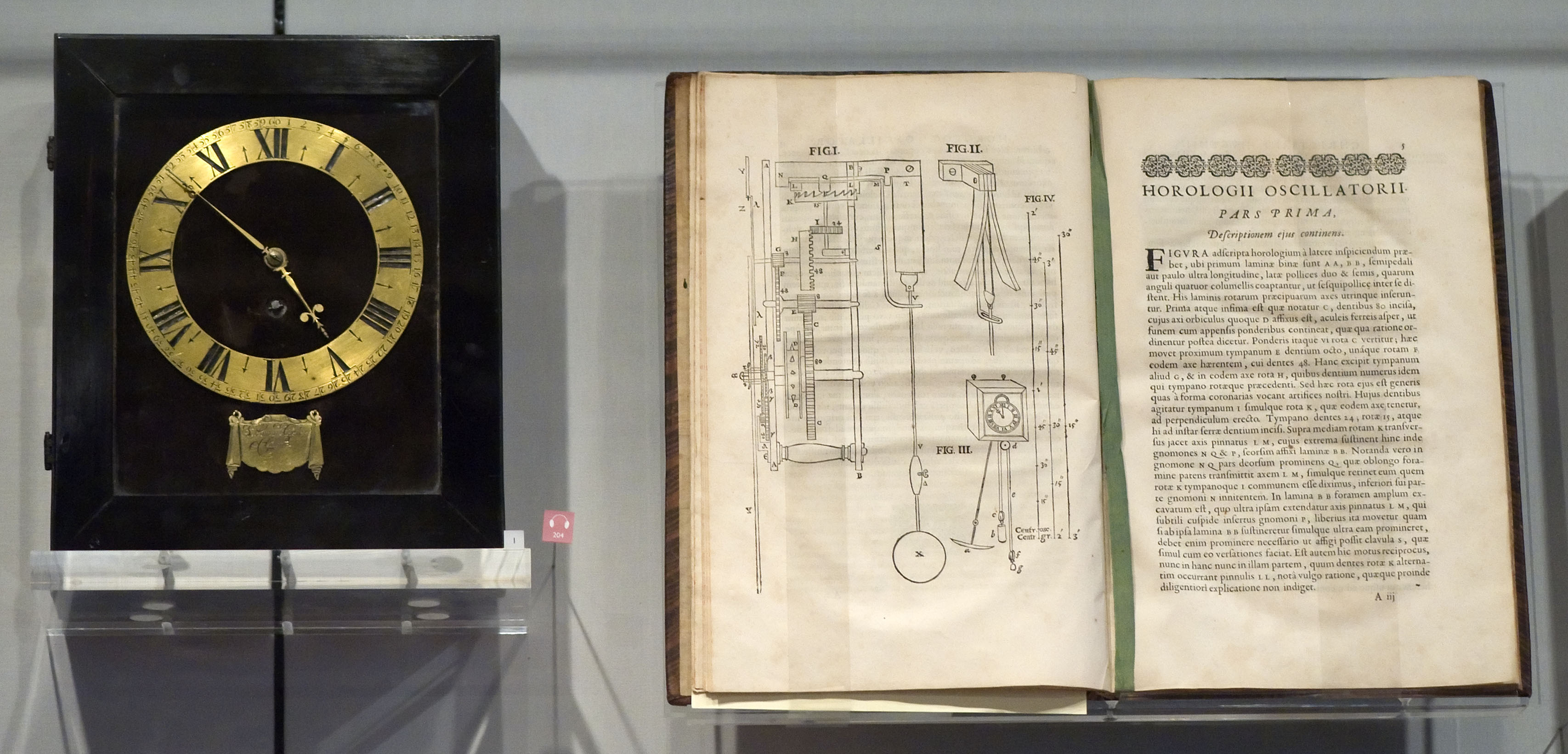
Spring driven pendulum clock, designed by Huygens, built by instrument maker Salomon Coster (1657), and manuscript Horologium Oscillatorium

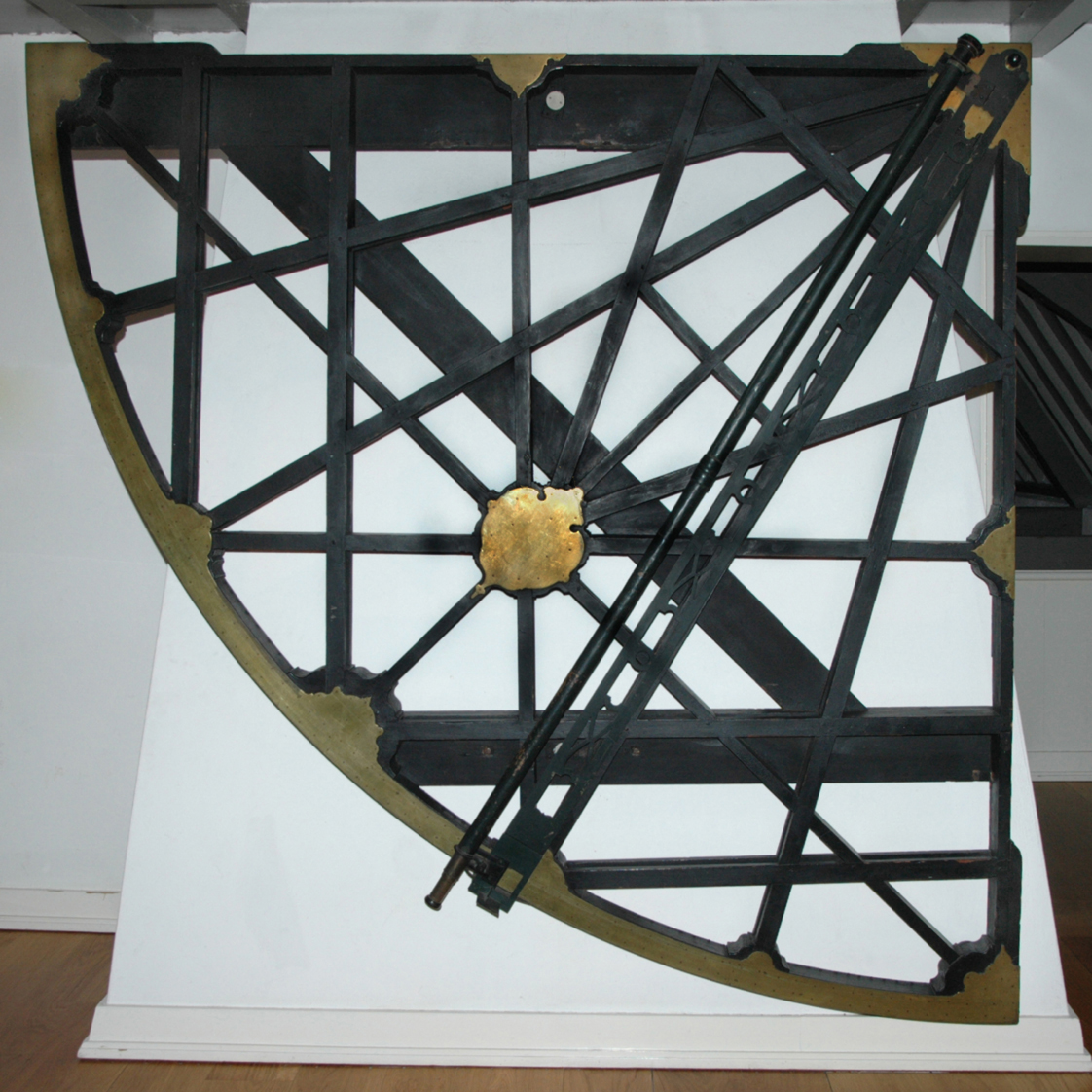
Snellius Quadrant

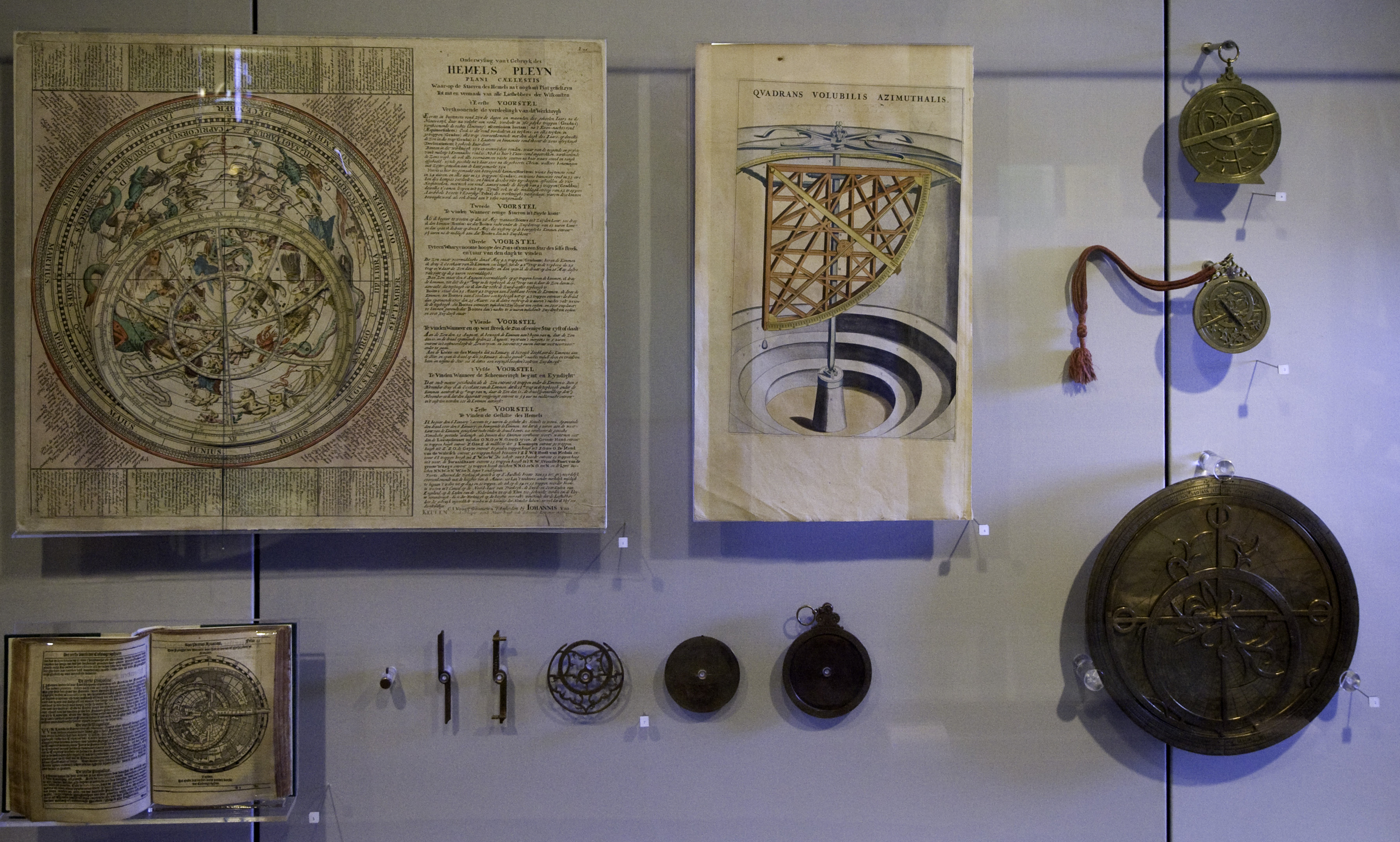
Astronomy

=== 18th century ===
The following two rooms are dedicated to an era of blossom for the University of Leiden, the oldest university of the Netherlands (founded in 1575).

4 Leiden University: Boerhaave and ‘s Gravensande

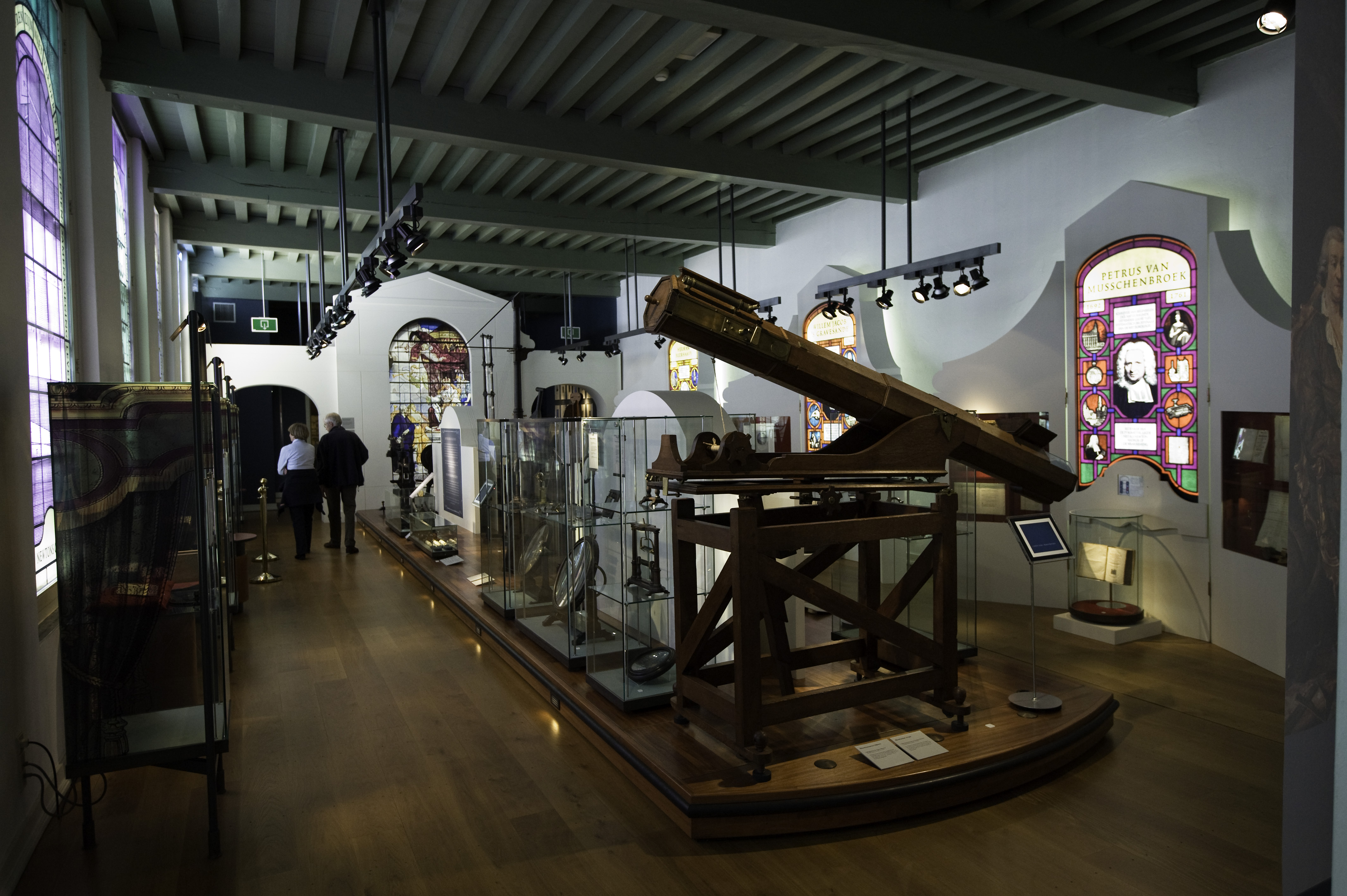
Room 4: University of Leiden, Boerhaave and ‘s Gravensande

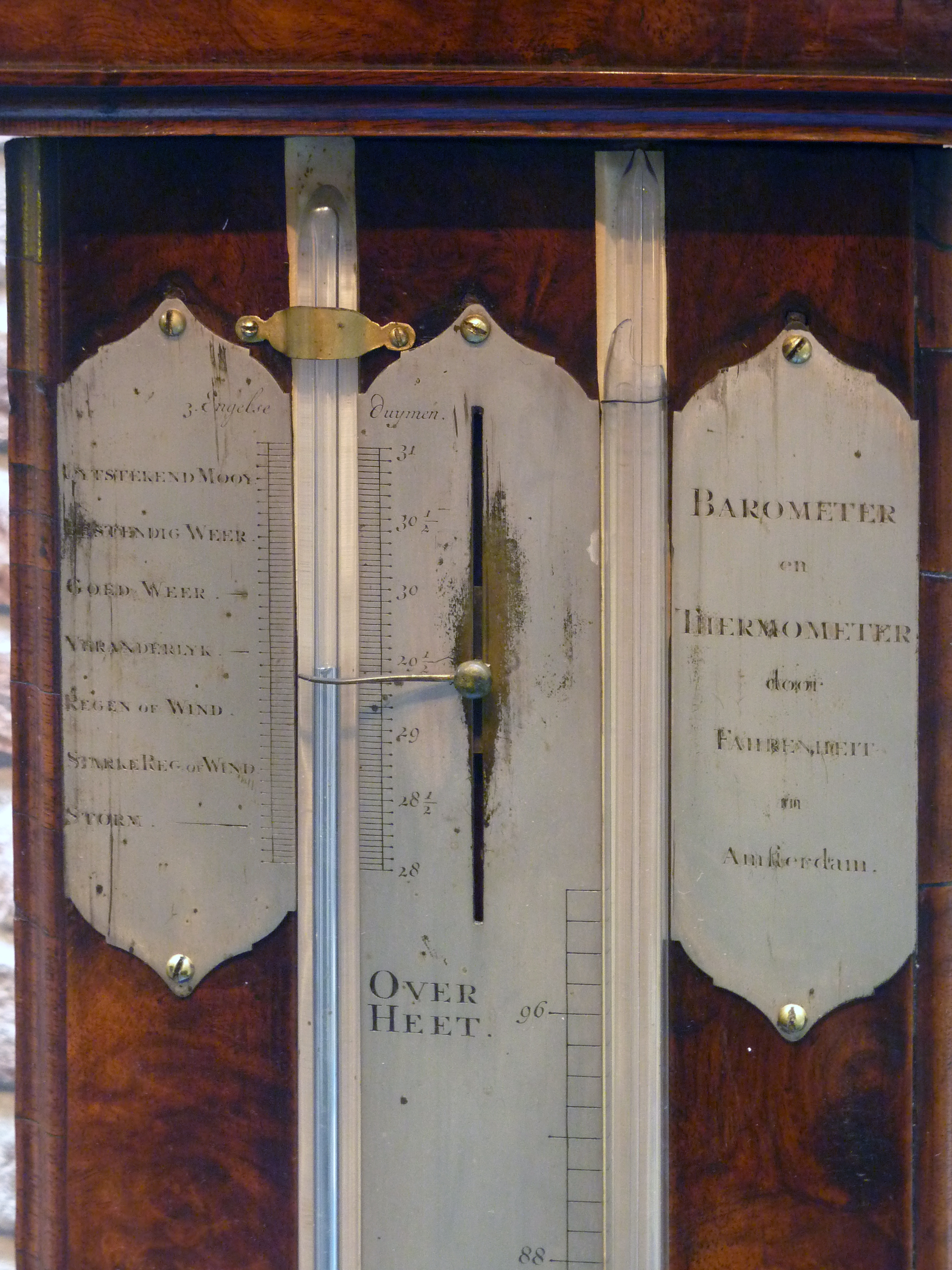
Fahrenheit thermo barometer

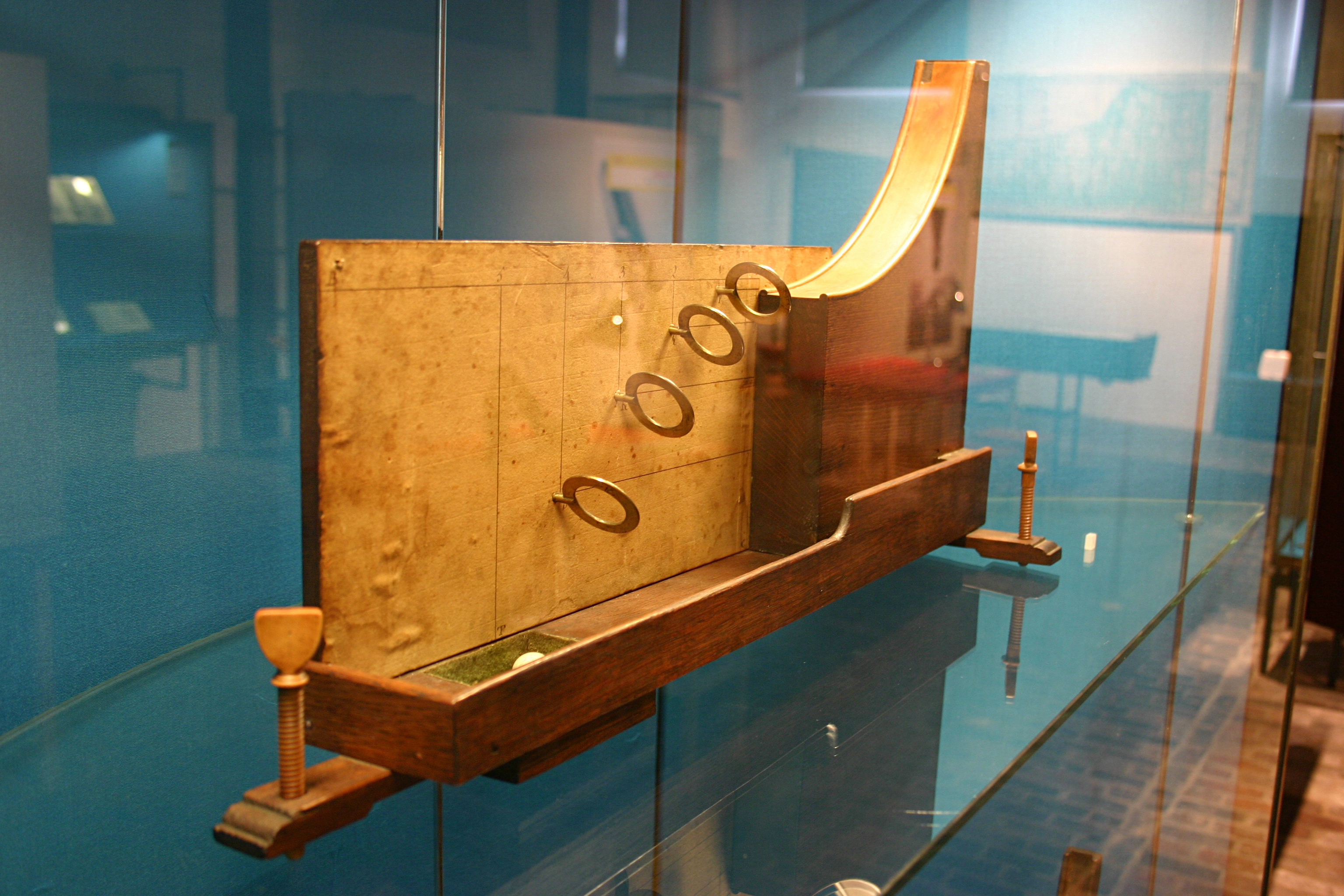
Demonstration device

This large room is dedicated to physician, botanist and chemist Herman Boerhaave, physicist Willem 's Gravesande and instrument-maker Jan van Musschenbroeck. On display are large globes and a tiny pocket globe (all ~1700), each depicting heaven and earth. A table size planetarium by clock-maker Steven Tracy Mercury shows Venus, Earth with its moon, Mars, Jupiter with four moons and Saturn. There is also a large star atlas.

Air pumps (1670–1730) and demonstration devices, notably several Magdeburg hemispheres, were made to explore the properties of the newly discovered vacuum. Other devices did the same for centrifugal force, collisions and laws of momentum, and gravity.

Hydrometers, an aerometer, a hydrostatic bellows, a balance and steam pump, several table-top fountains all were used to look into hydrostatic pressure, and capillary attraction.

Also shown are a large set of mathematical instruments to measure angles: sectors, a protractor and beam compass.

A collection of balances, levers, tackles demonstrate laws of statics.

A variety of lenses, prisms, a slit, trays and screens explore optics. About ten screw-barrel and compound microscopes (1710–1780) demonstrate how this young science underwent dramatic progress in few years. A variety of curved mirrors, used as anamorphic toys, show how a deliberately distorted image can be restored back to the original.

The room also houses a range of instruments (levers and forceps) used to facilitate childbirth.

Lastly, shown are models of three out of five of Archimedes' so called simple machines (lever, inclined plane, wedge, screw and wheel), several hydrostatic balances to demonstrate Archimedes' law and two tables of forces which demonstrate interactions of forces in a horizontal plane.

5 Leiden University: Linnaeus and Van Musschenbroek

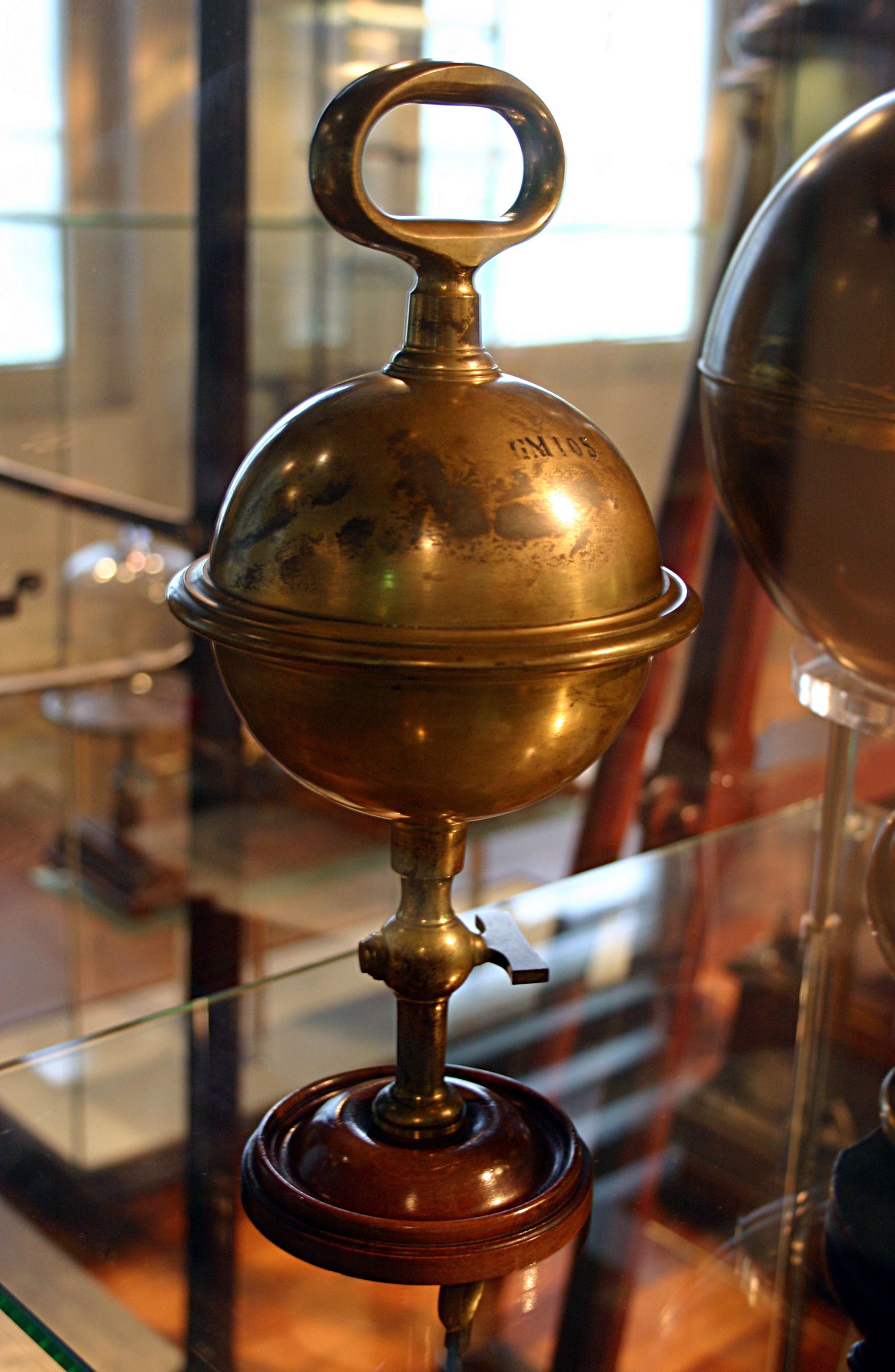
Magdeburg hemispheres

Carl Linnaeus published his famous Systema Naturae in 1735, during his 3-year stay in the Dutch Republic, in which he also earned a degree in medicine, and closely worked together with Boerhaave. At display are paintings of Linnaeus and Boerhaave. Also 18th-century models and scientific measuring instruments: models that demonstrate basic physics principles, and instruments: several antique thermometers, a barometer, a theodolite and several pyrometers. Also two antique globes (one showing the heavens, one earth) and two mirror telescopes. The room is conamed after the brothers van Mussenbroeck: Pieter a professor, credited with the invention of the first capacitor in 1746: the Leyden jar, and Jan a famous instrument maker, who shipped his hand crafted precision thermometers all over Europe.

6 Wonders of nature

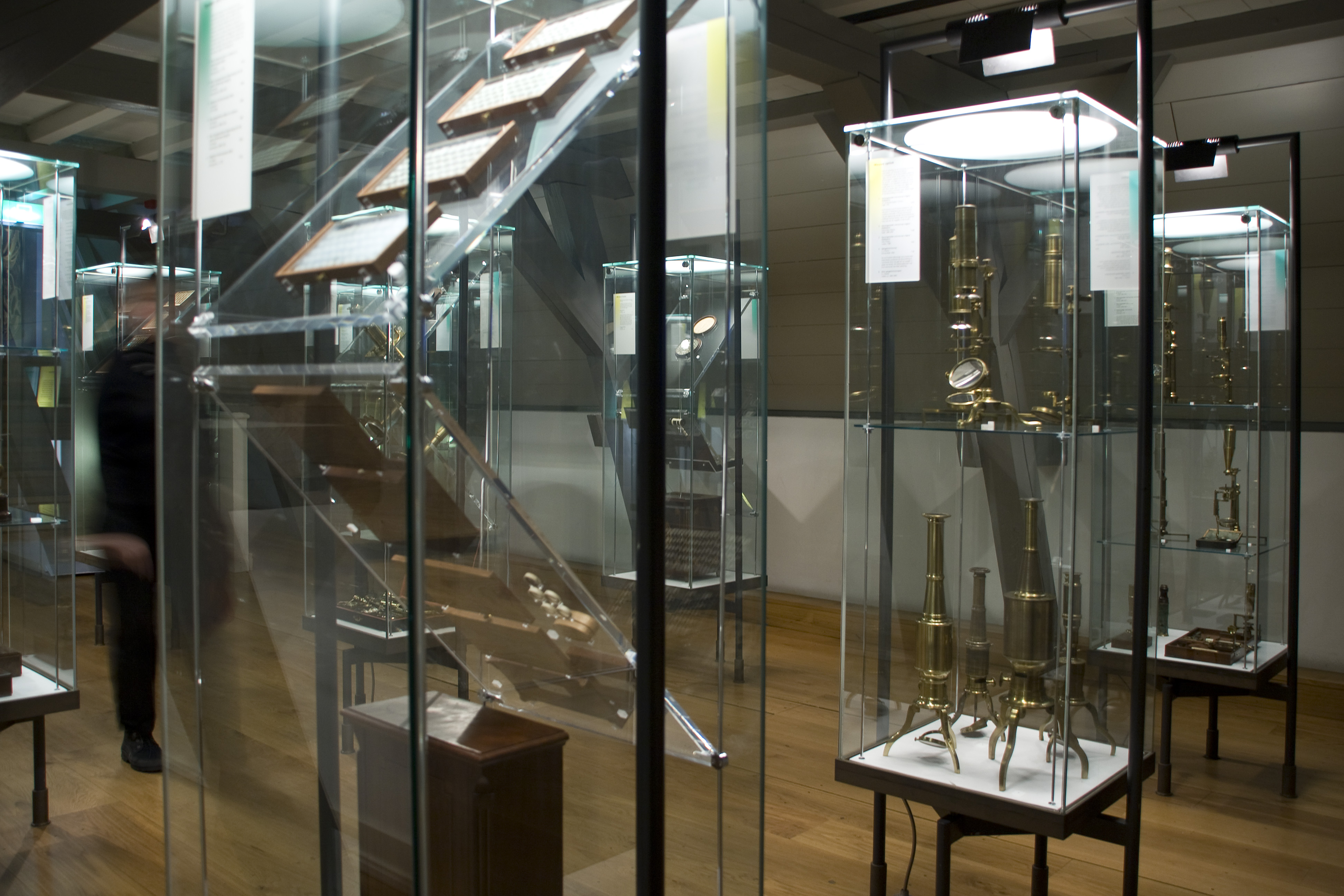
Room 6: Wonders of Nature

Over 30 antique microscopes are shown, most from the 18th century, in a large variety, with different solutions for lighting the subject and minimization of lens defects (e.g. chromatic aberration): simple, compound and reflecting microscopes, so called English microscopes (renowned for their quality), solar microscopes (which project their image on a wall, using sunlight only). Several wooden cabinets with microscopic slides are testimony of the craftsmanship than went into collections of ready made samples, which at the time were highly fashionable among well-to-do citizens who took an interest in scientific developments.

7 Collection: The Albinus Brothers

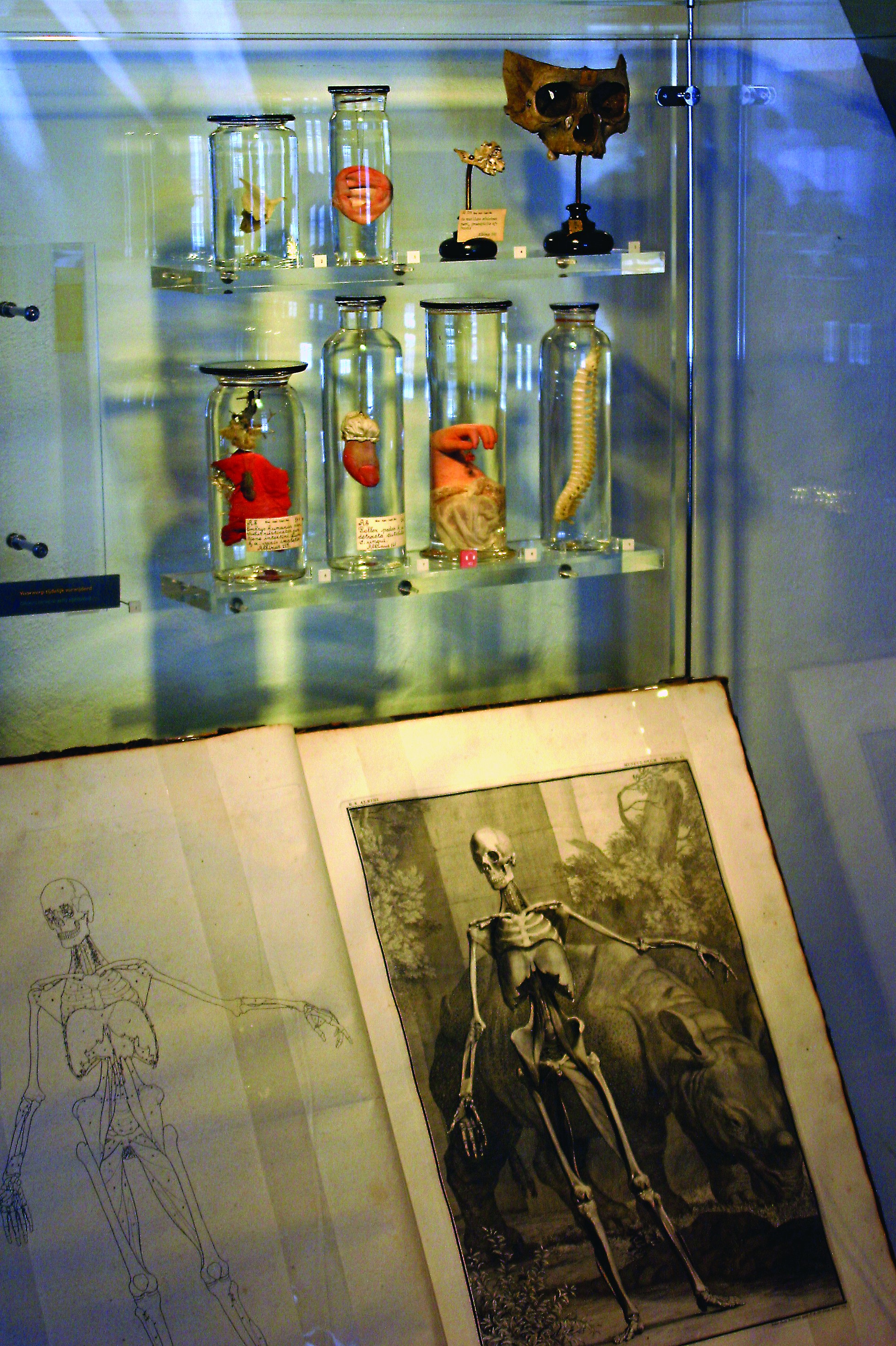
Room 7: Specimens prepared by Bernhard Siegfried Albinus (1697–1770) and his brother Frederik Bernhard

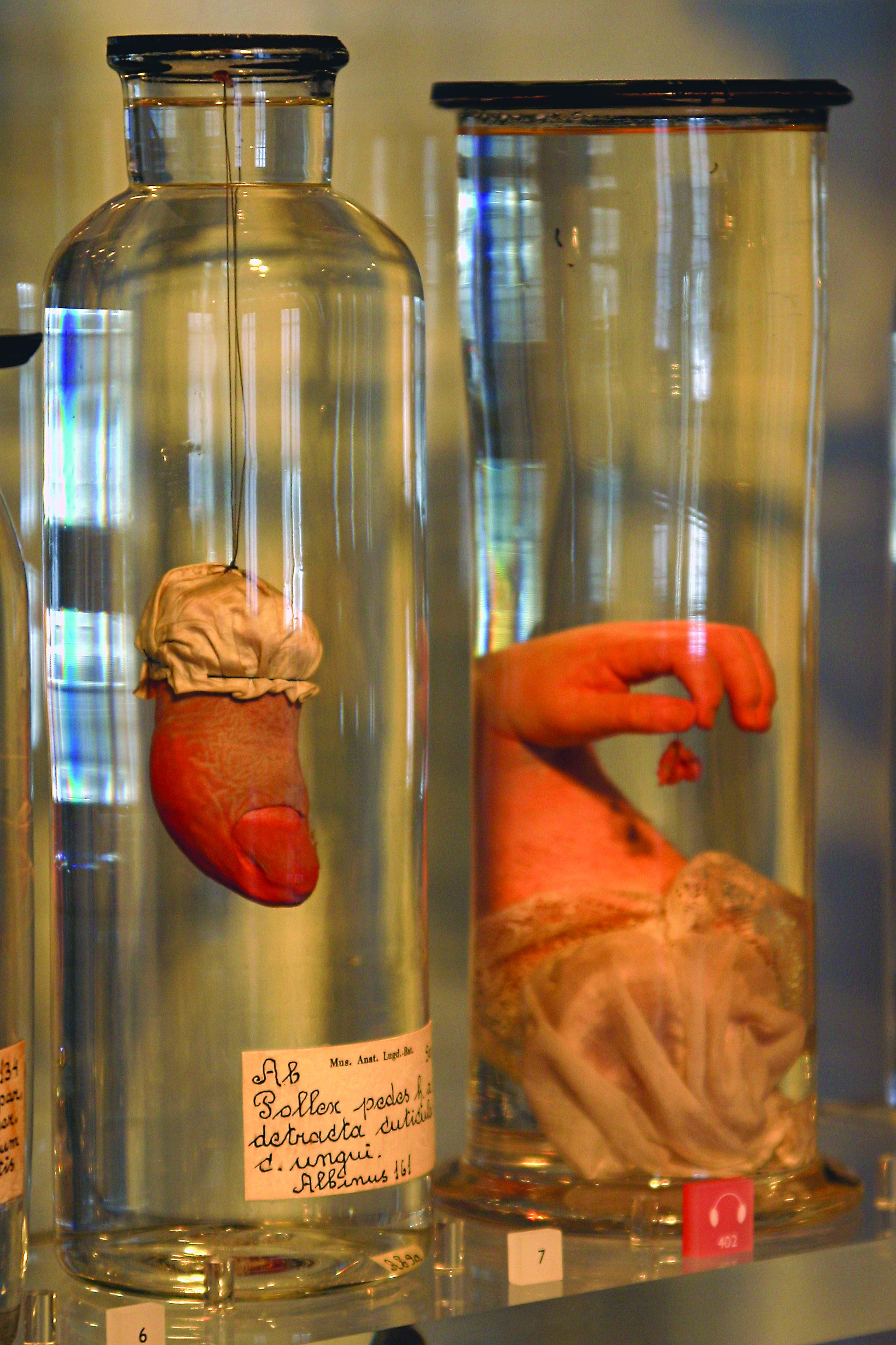
Specimen by brothers Albinus

The room is dedicated to famous 18th-century anatomist Bernhard Siegfried Albinus and his brother and successor Frederik Bernhard Albinus, showing a few of the over 750 wet and dry anatomical samples that Bernhard Siegfried collected, and a wide variety of medical instruments (most 1670–1700) collected by his brother: several amputation saws and knives, cauterizing irons, a wide variety of forceps and clamps, spatulas, an elevator, a bullet extractor and brace, several (drill) crowns, two drills, a lenticular, several elevatoriums, a chuck key, a coach screw, a retractor, lithotomy scoops, a Phimosis knife, gorgerets, a catheter, a bistoury cache, a combined syringotome and seton needle, a wound retractor, lithotomy directors, probes, a tobacco enema

8 Collection: Sebaldus Justinus Brugmans

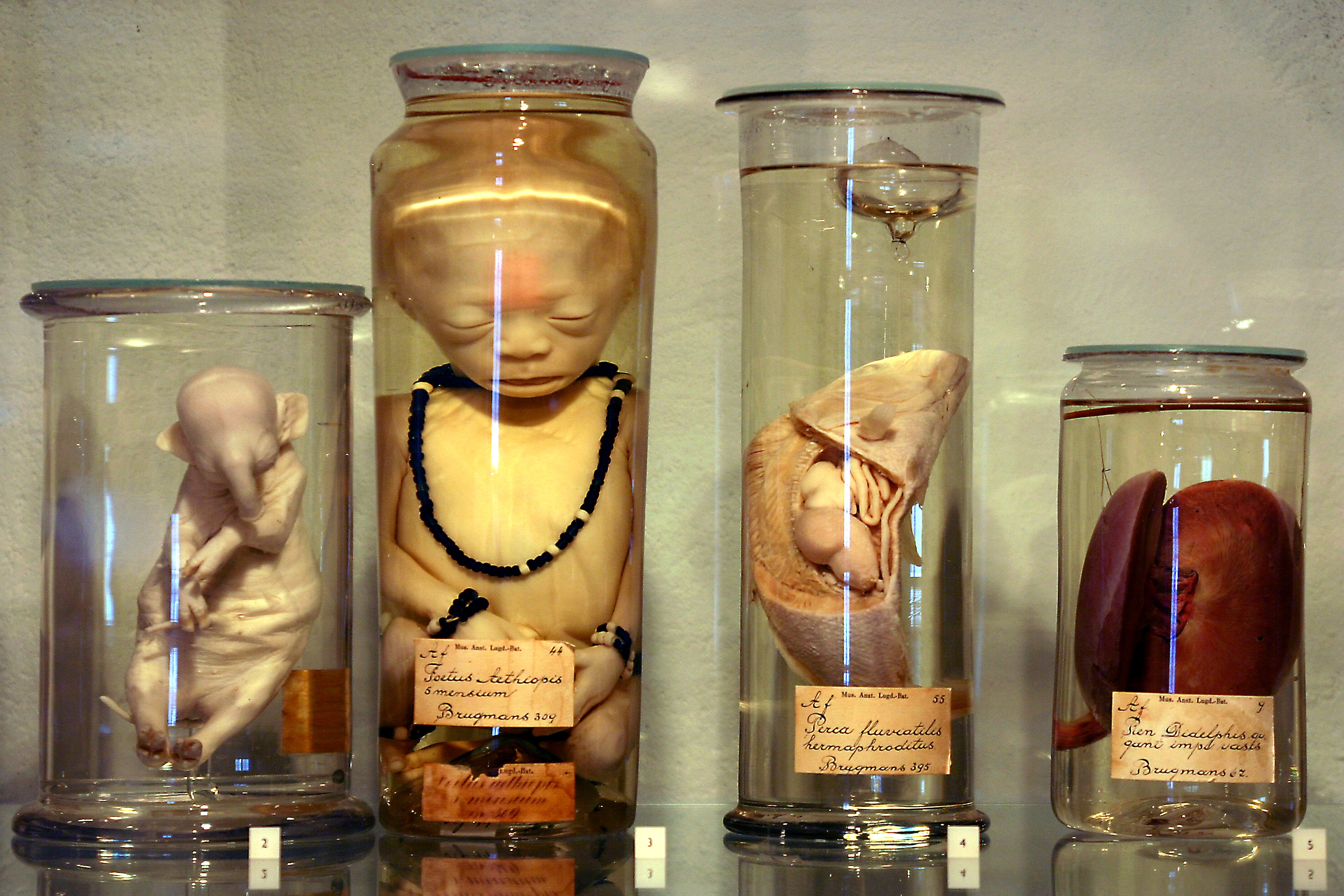
Specimen by Sebaldus Justinus Brugmans

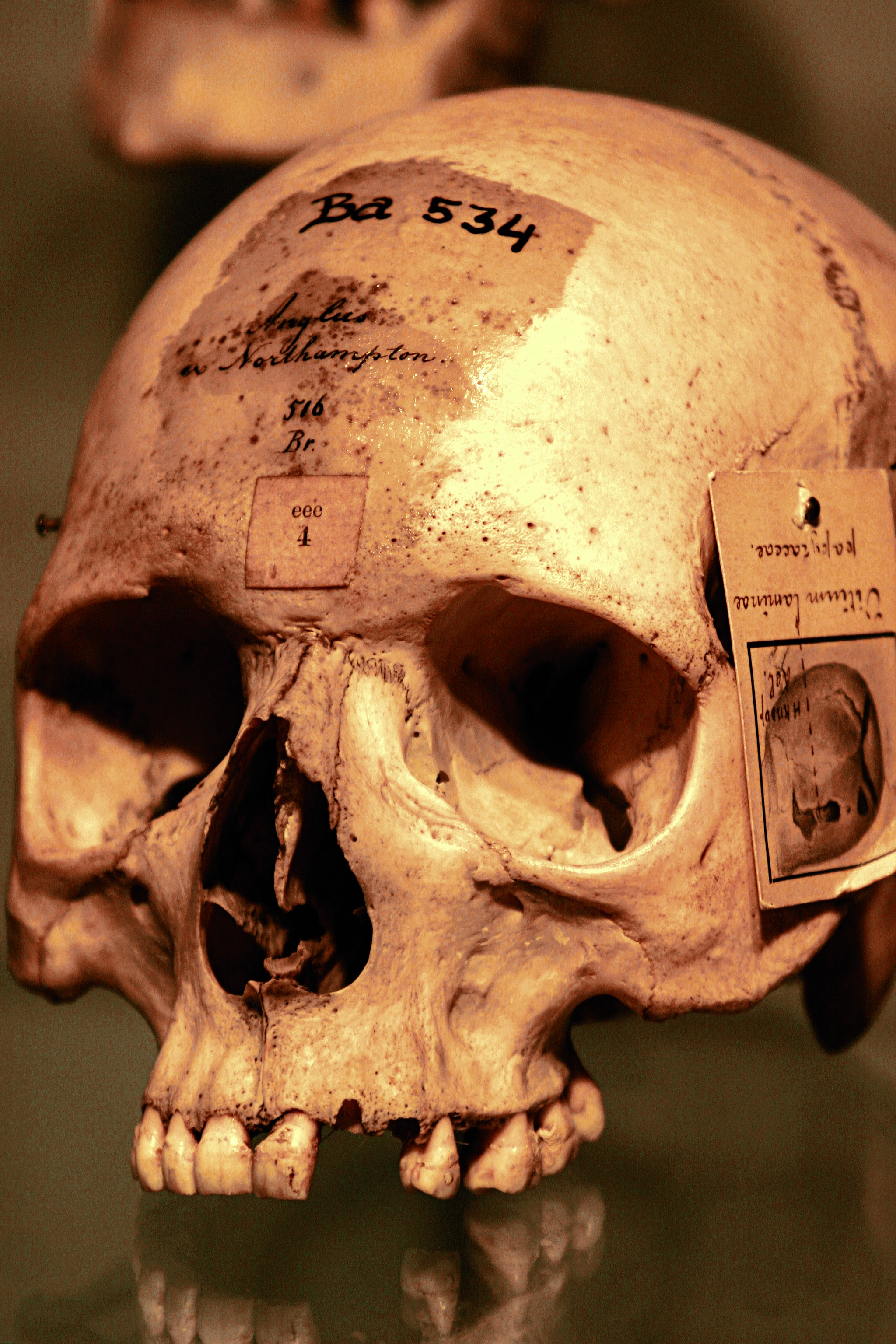
Skull by Sebaldus Justinus Brugmans

Sebald Justinus Brugmans was a Dutch botanist, physician and professor of natural sciences. As an army physician he became notable for his battle against unsanitary conditions, and spread of contagious diseases. The room shows a large collection of fish skins ('the protected body'), human skulls (some affected by accident or disease), animal skulls (mainly birds) and a variety of other anatomic samples, including some foetuses in a jar.

10 Hendrik Bosch's collection of medicine, Butterfly cabinet

The room houses a large simples cabinet (1760), from Amsterdam physician Hendrik Bosch. Also a large cabinet with butterflies (1760) (content lost) from Christiaan Sepp and son, who published a work on butterflies and insects in several volumes (1762–1860).

=== 19th century ===
9 Collection: Nature in drawers and cabinets

A large collection of shells. Four book shaped boxes (1809), out of a collection of 150, each box made of wood of a particular tree or shrub and filled with its wood, leaves, seeds and fruits. Also on display cases with butterflies and beetles. Lastly a portrait of Abraham Nieuwland (1780).

11 Collection: Theodoor Gerard van Lidth de Jeude

Shown are a collection of 19th century animal organ specimens (protected against decay with wax and varnish) which had been prepared for research (e.g. comparative anatomy), and educational purposes (e.g. veterinarian school). Also shown are anatomical drawings from that same period. Many specimens and drawings are from large mammals, cattle but even more large mammals of non European origin.

12 Collection: Repositories of the animal kingdom

The room shows wax models of human and animal brains (1850–1870), prepared for educational purposes. Also display boxes with carefully arranged human hand bones and foot bones, and several skeletons of small animals. Also some 25 jars containing animals in preservative fuels (alcohol, formalin), some anatomically prepared to show inner organs (1830–1910). Part of the collection in the room was prepared by Jan van der Hoeven (1802–1868), professor of Zoology, Comparative Anatomy, Anthropology, Mineralogy and Geology at the University of Leiden. His portrait is on display. Van der Hoeven studied members of 'exotic races' (as it was called at the time), and produced a large amount of visual materials (drawings, engravings, lithographs). Three of these visual studies are on display.

13 Collection: Petrus Koning

Anatomical wax models by Petrus Koning (1787–1834), anatomical gouaches

14 Temporary exhibition space
15 Temporary exhibition space

16 Electricity and light

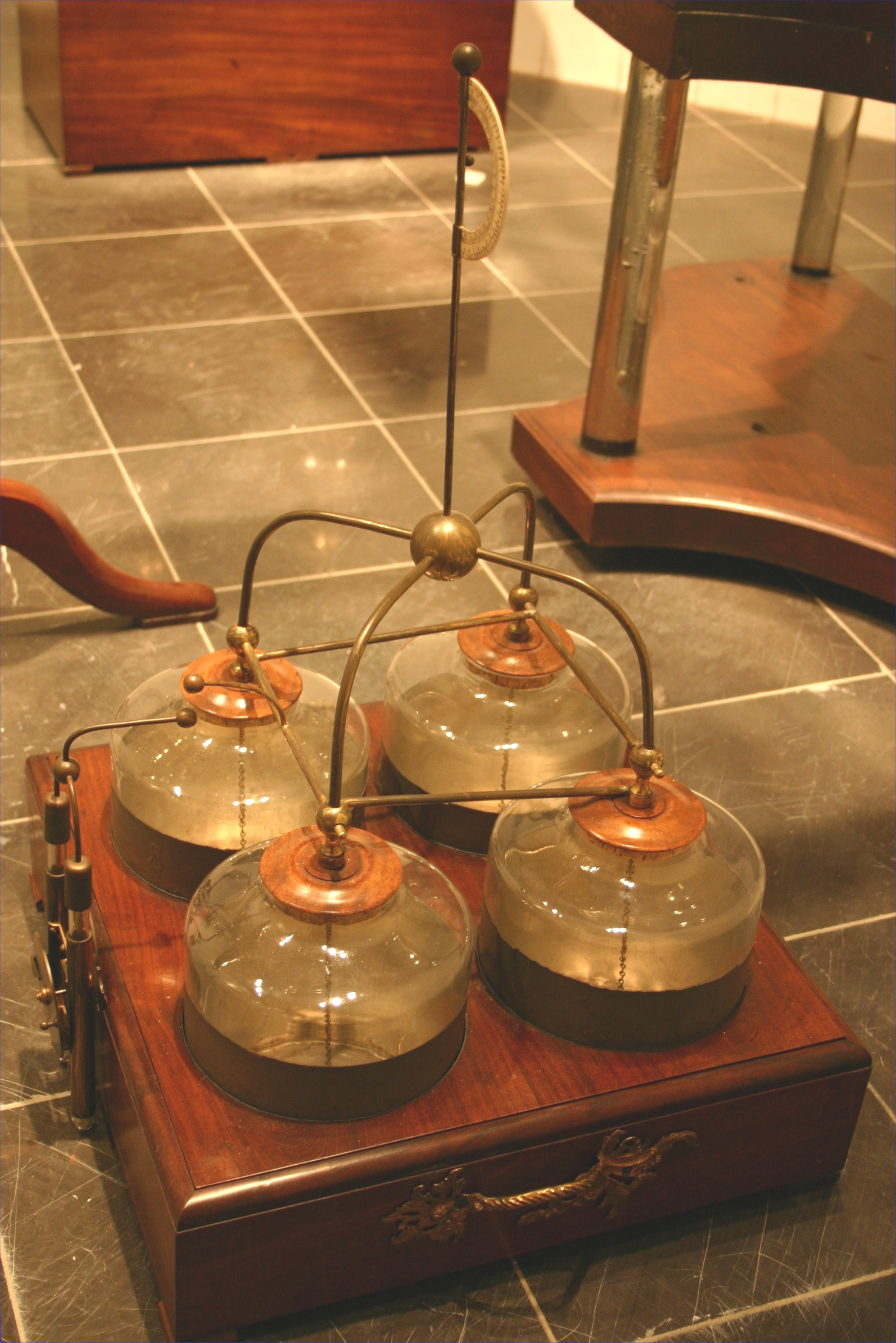
Leiden Jars

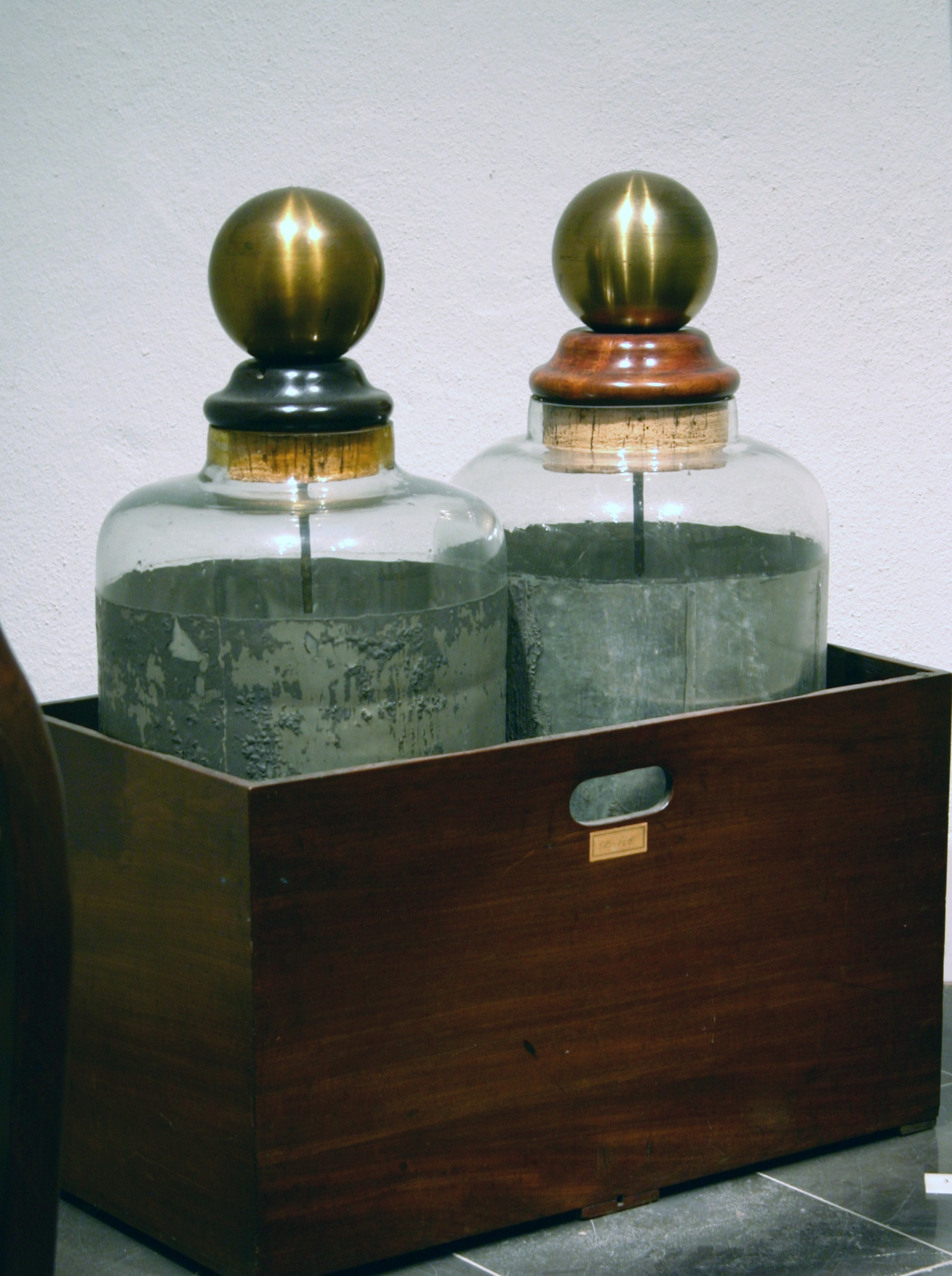
Leiden Jars

This room is dedicated to the scientific and technical progress in fields of electricity and optics in the 19th century. Inventions like telegraphy and the camera had a revolutionary and lasting impact on everyday life.

The room shows a collection of 'microscopes (compound, binocular, achromatic, inverted) (1730–1860) and attributes. A set of instruments for optical chemical analysis (1850–1900): a crystal goniometer, a polarimeter, a saccharimeter, a spectroscope, a bunsen burner, a solution tube, gas-discharge tubes. Devices to study, demonstrate and explain the physical qualities of light: prisms and lenses, a heliostat and carbon arc lamp (with clockwork)(1820–1870). A collection of applied optics: a camera, sextant, stereoscope, several telescopes, mechanical lantern slides, a repeating reflecting circle (?), a phantascope (two discs, one with slits, one with images, which when rotating in opposite directions create a cinematographic effect), a projection lantern (1770–1860). Several telescopes: achromatic telescopes (1770 and 1850) and a reflecting telescope (1830). Several electrostatic devices: batteries composed of leyden jars and electrical machines (1770–1800) that were used to generate electricity. A variety of electrostatic toys and experimentation kits (1770–1820) to amuse and educate the public. Some show cases still to do.

17 Zander Devices

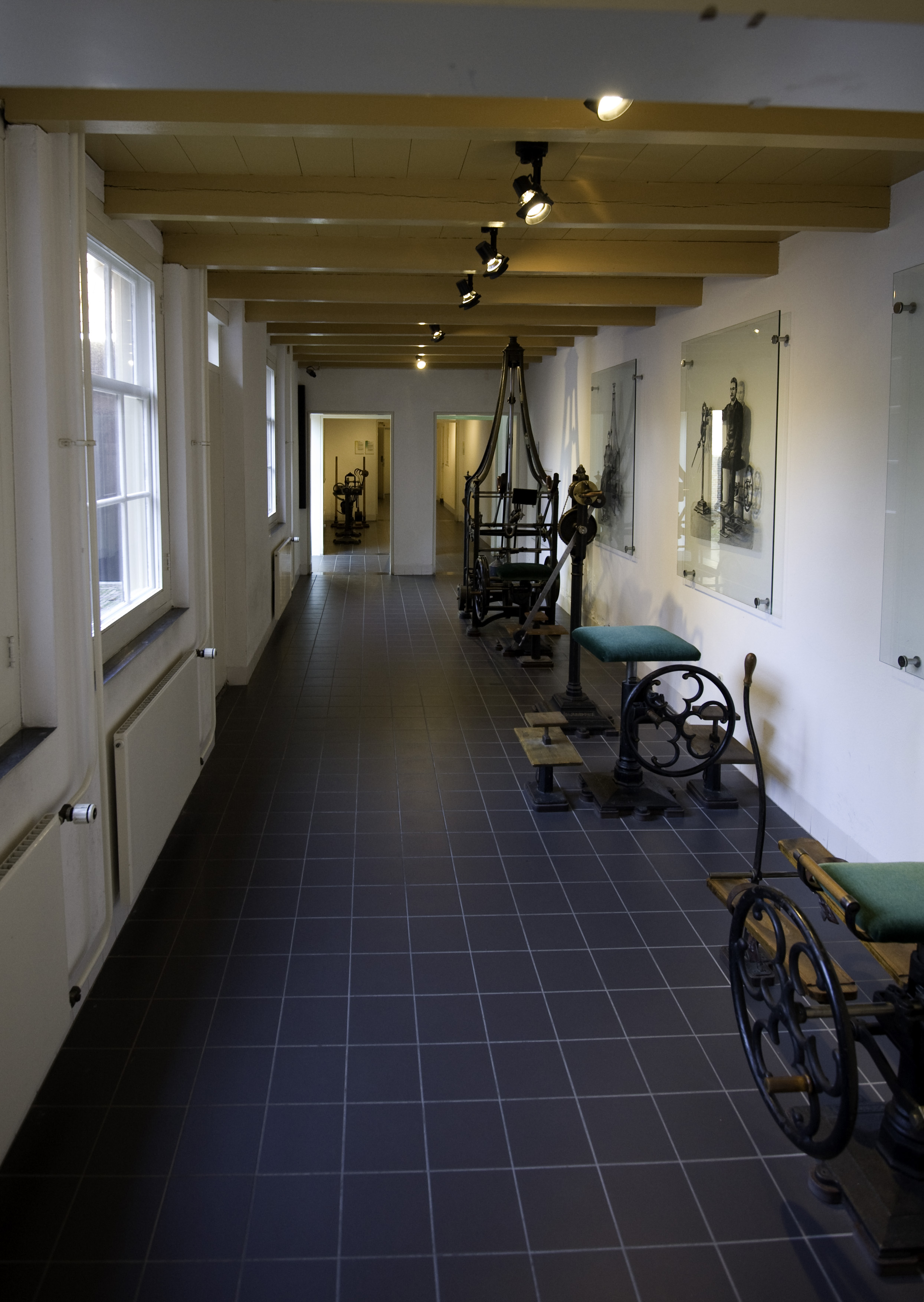
Zander devices

Devices for physiotherapy using the method of Swedish physician Gustav Zander, developed ca. 1865. These devices featured on two world exhibitions. Their success led to 120 Zander institutes worldwide.

18 Specialisation in medicine

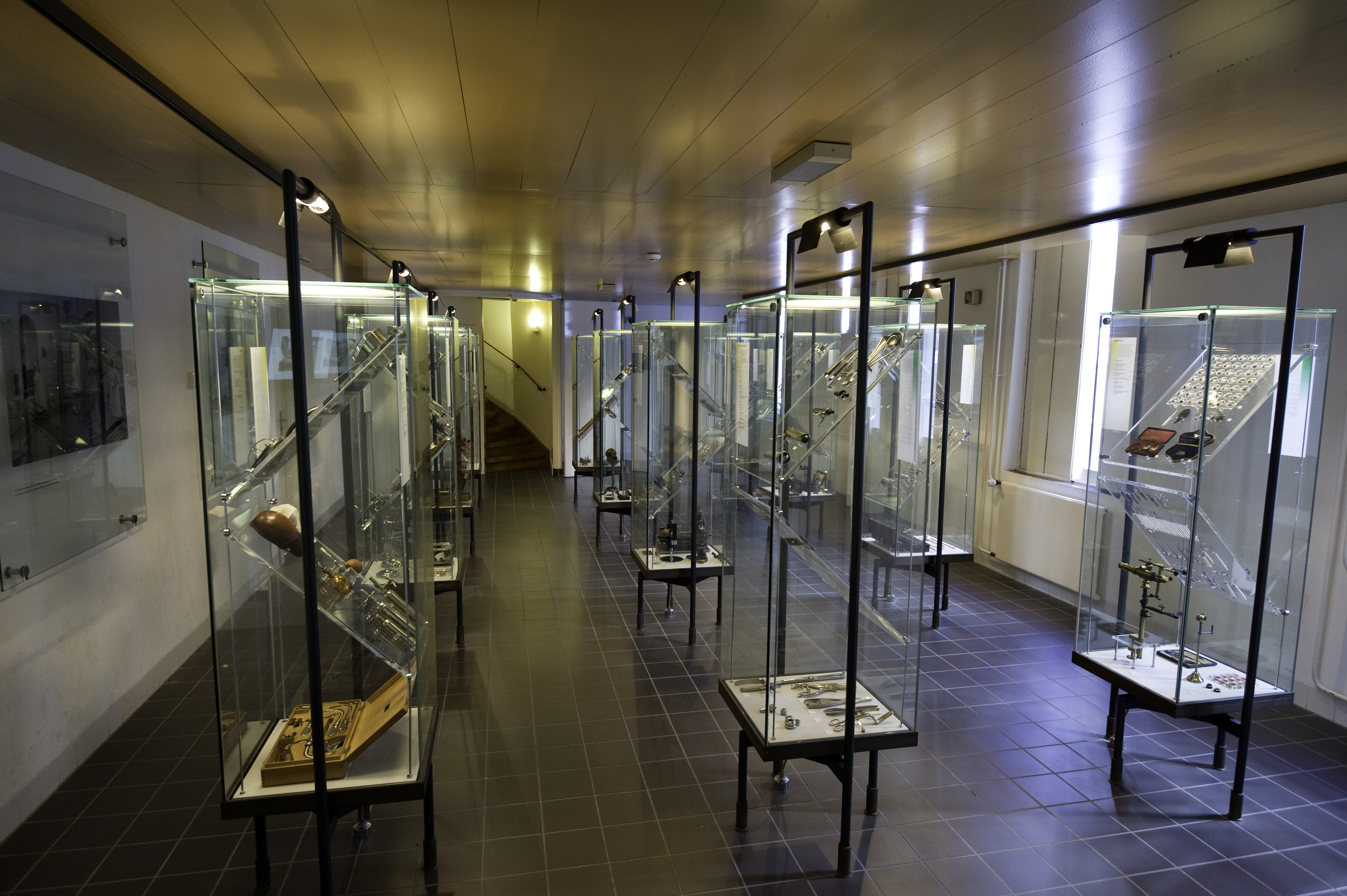
Room 18: Specialization in Medicine

19 The Anatomical world of Dr Auzoux

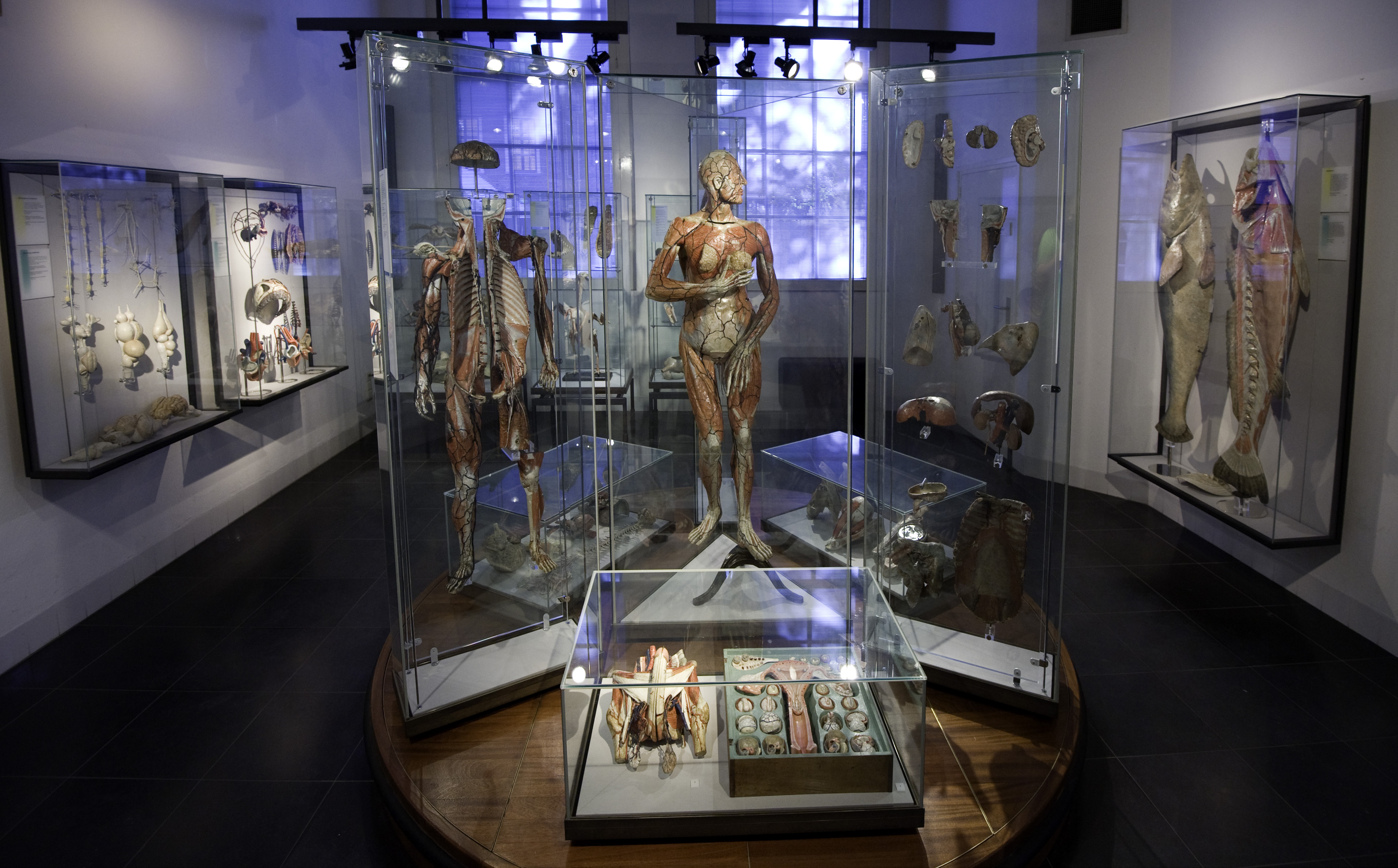
Room 19: Anatomical World of Auzoux

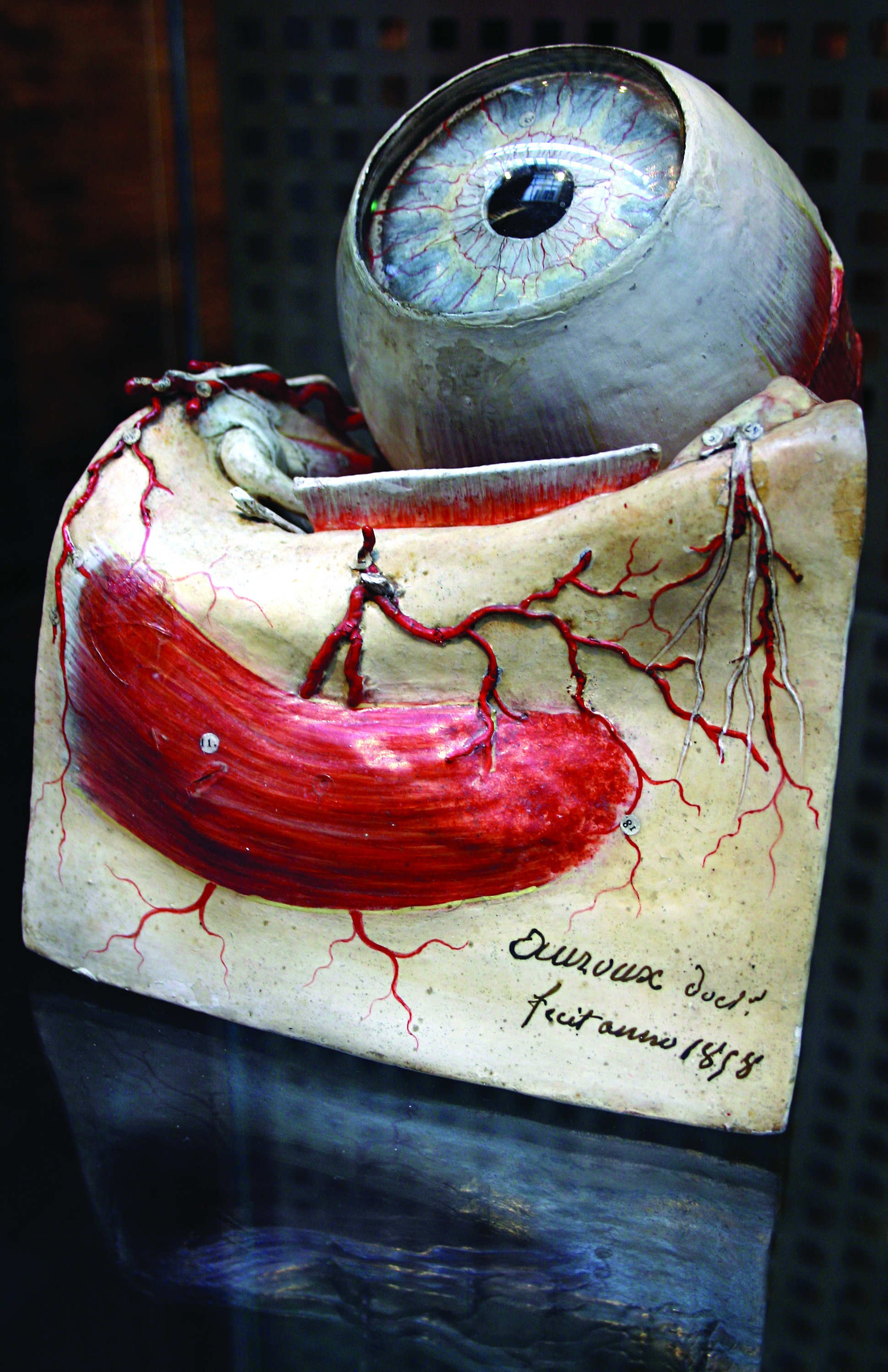
Model of eye, by Dr. Auzoux

French doctor Louis Auzoux (1797–1870) pioneered the use of papier-mâché for highly detailed and colored anatomical models, with detachable parts, which allowed mass production for educational purposes. A selection of the many models on display: many human body parts, for example a box set with a model of female sexual organs plus almost 20 embryonic stages, models of the womb for every month of pregnancy. For purposes of comparative anatomy: models of brain or nervous system of diverse animals, models of blood circulation in diverse animals (e.g. a turtle, a crocodile), models of stomach or alimentary canal (e.g. octopus, honey bee).

=== 20th century ===
20 Chemistry: Dutch First Nobel Prize

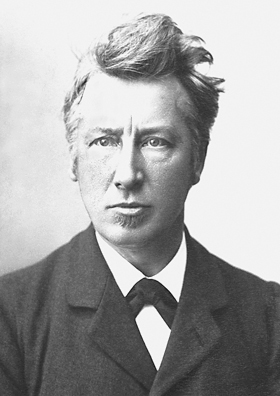
Jacobus Henricus van 't Hoff

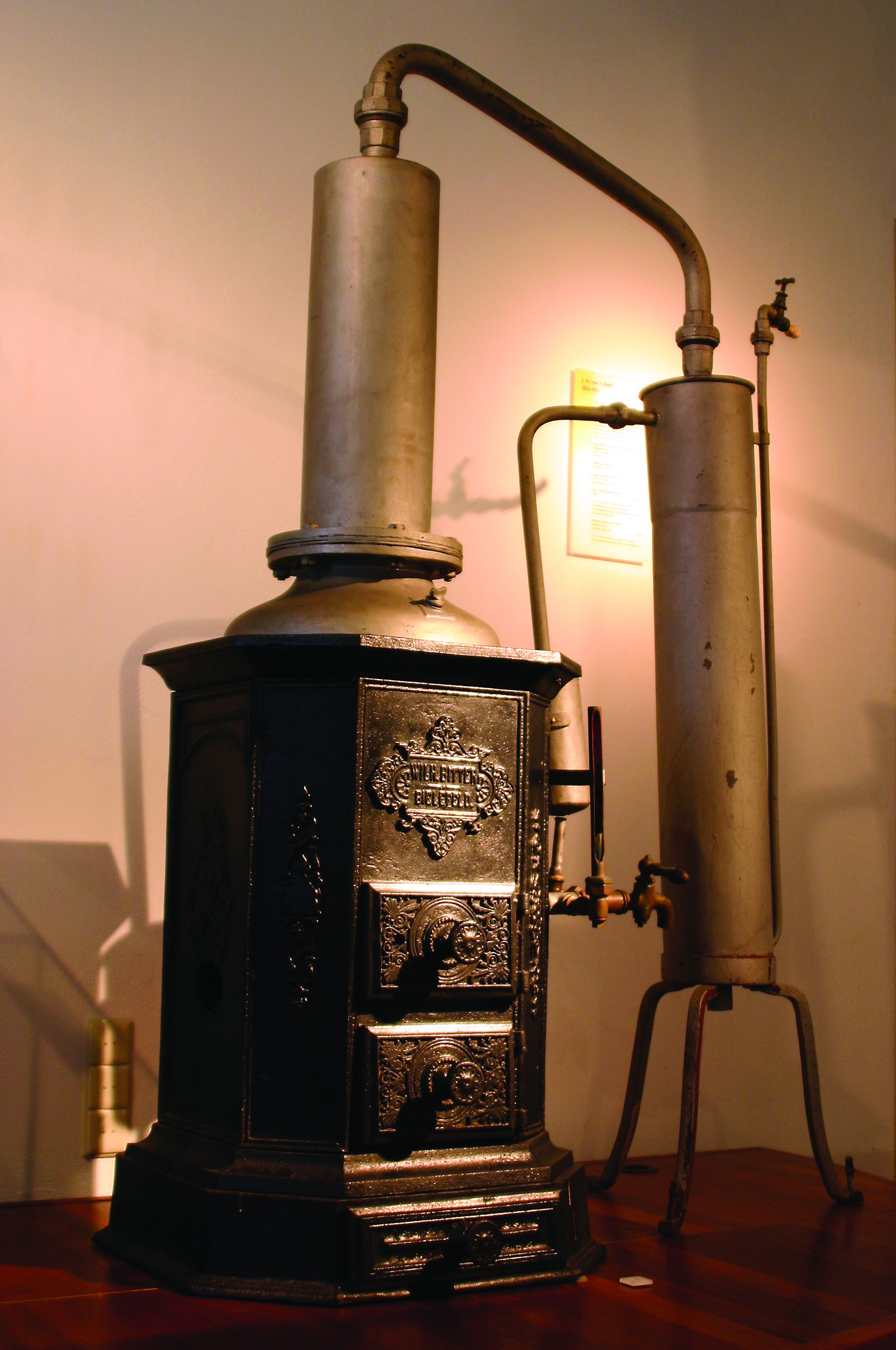
Distilling apparatus

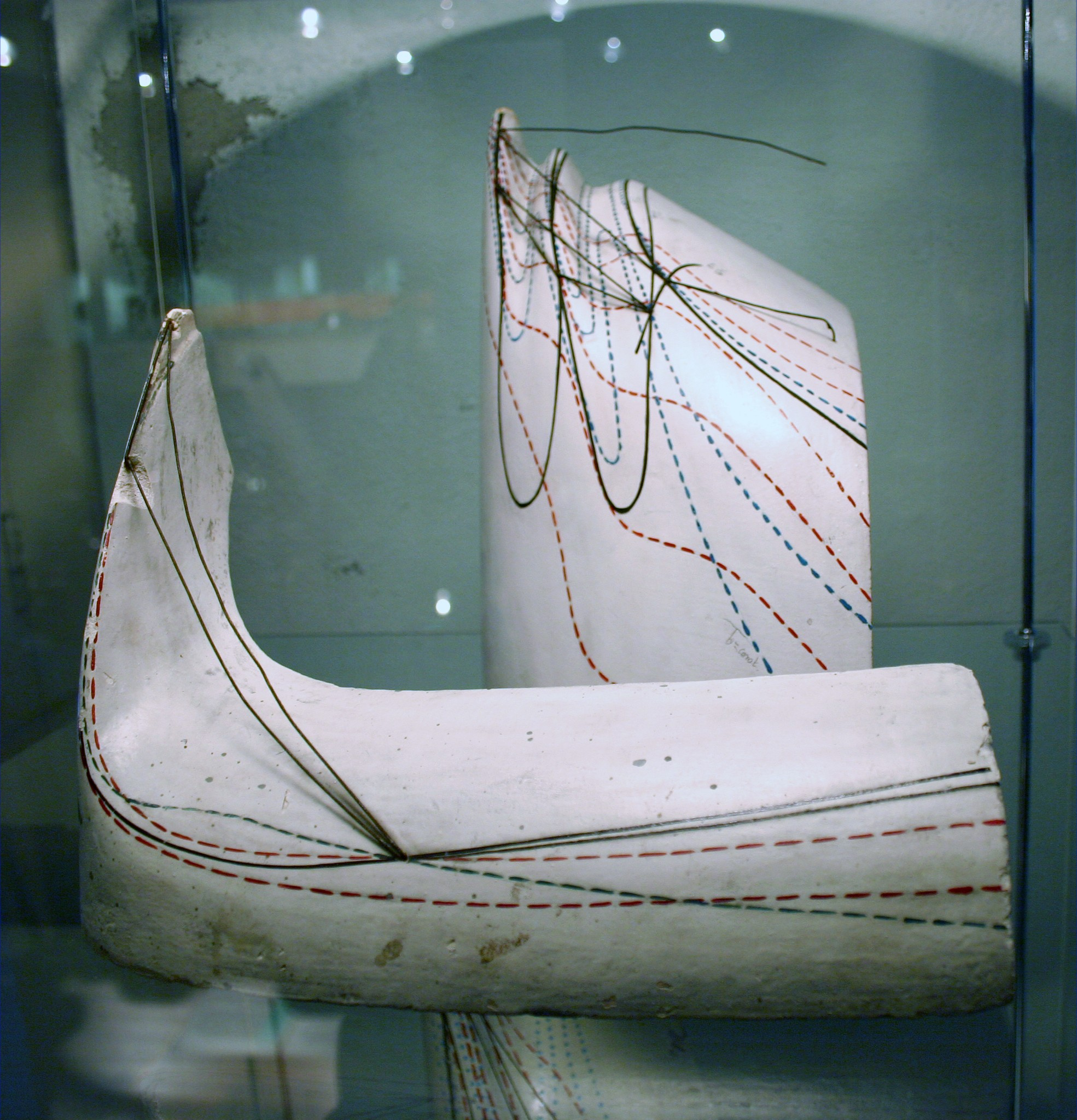
Plaster model of energy surface for carbon dioxide

Dutch scientist Jacobus Henricus van 't Hoff (1852–1911) was the first person to receive the Nobel Prize in Chemistry, for his discovery of the laws of chemical dynamics and osmotic pressure in solutions.

In the room hangs a painted portrait of van 't Hoff. His golden Nobel prize medal, and a lab journal are also shown. Also a variety of elementary equipment for a chemical laboratory: a distilling apparatus for water (1860), dilatometers, thermometers, hydrometers, alcohol meters, an oleometer, a colorimeter (1880), pycnometers (some with thermometer), pipettes, burettes, volumetric flasks, a boiling flask, a spectral burner and spectroscope (1880), polarimeters, a kipp generator (1850), sample collections of experimental chemicals (some in wooden boxes), an evaporating basin, gas burners, an oxyhydrogen voltmeter, apparatus for electrolysis, an analytical balance, cork presses, a refractometer (1910), a flash point apparatus for petroleum, a circular slide rule.

21 Physics: Factories of Science

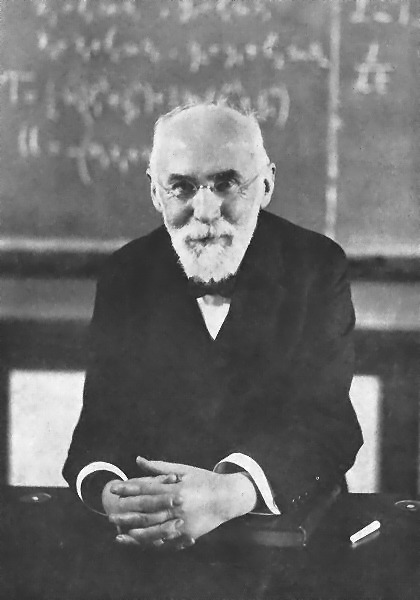
Hendrik Lorentz

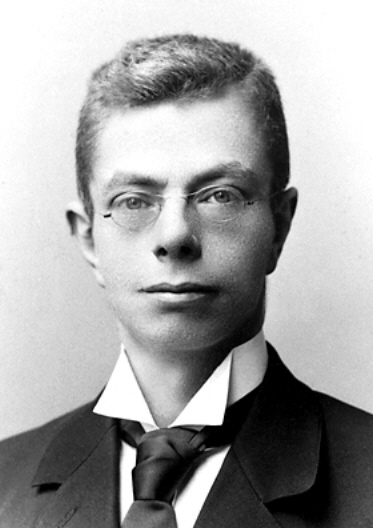
Pieter Zeeman

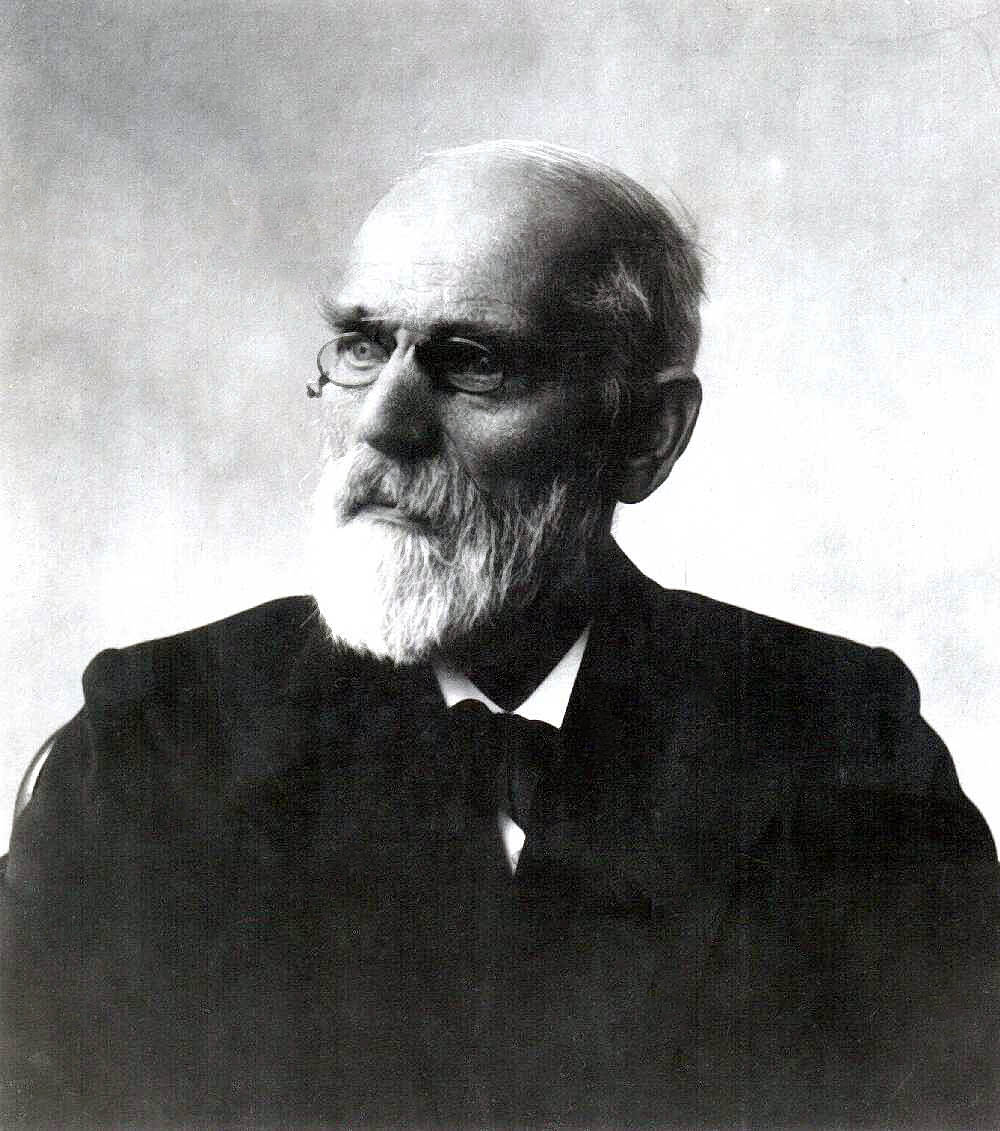
Diederik van der Waals

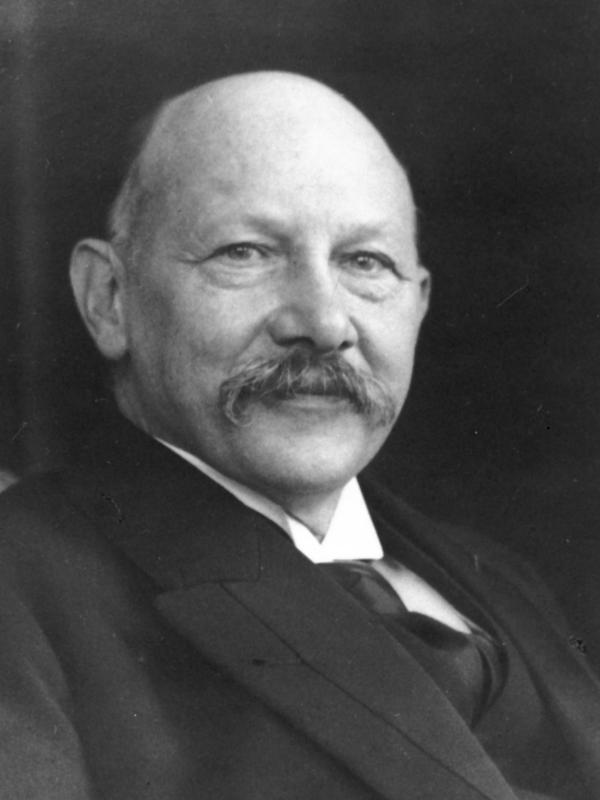
Heike Kamerlingh Onnes

In the early years of the 19th century, 4 Dutch physicists received a Nobel Prize in quick succession. This room is dedicated to their work and legacy.

- In 1902 Hendrik Lorentz (1853–1928) and Pieter Zeeman (1865–1943). For their combined work on and discovery of the Zeeman effect, where spectral lines split under the influence of a magnetic field.
- In 1910 Johannes Diderik van der Waals (1837–1923) thermodynamicist famous for his work on an equation of state for gases and liquids.
- In 1913 Heike Kamerlingh Onnes (1853–1926). Onnes was the first to liquefy helium (1908), and the discoverer of superconductivity. For many years his laboratory was the coldest place on earth.

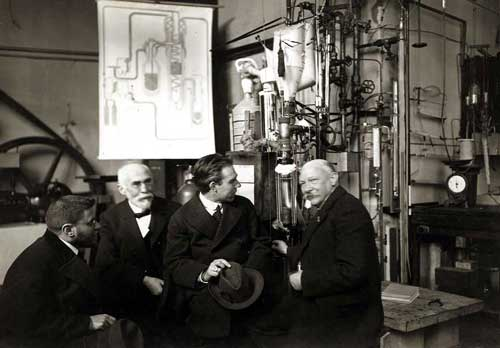
Paul Ehrenfest, Hendrik Lorentz and Niels Bohr visit Heike Kamerlingh Onnes (1919) in the cryogenic lab. Some instruments are now in the museum (room 21)

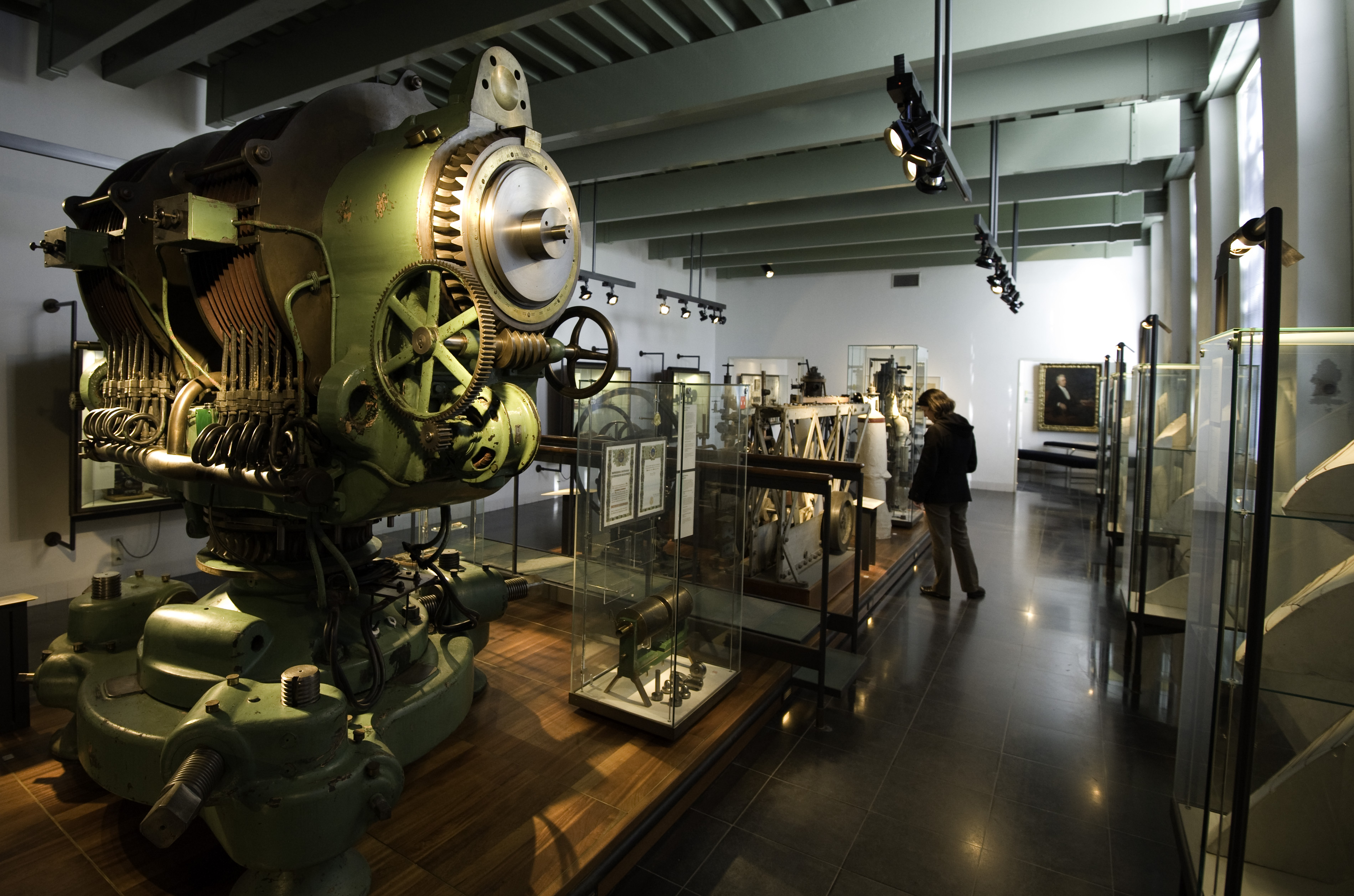
Room 21: Physics

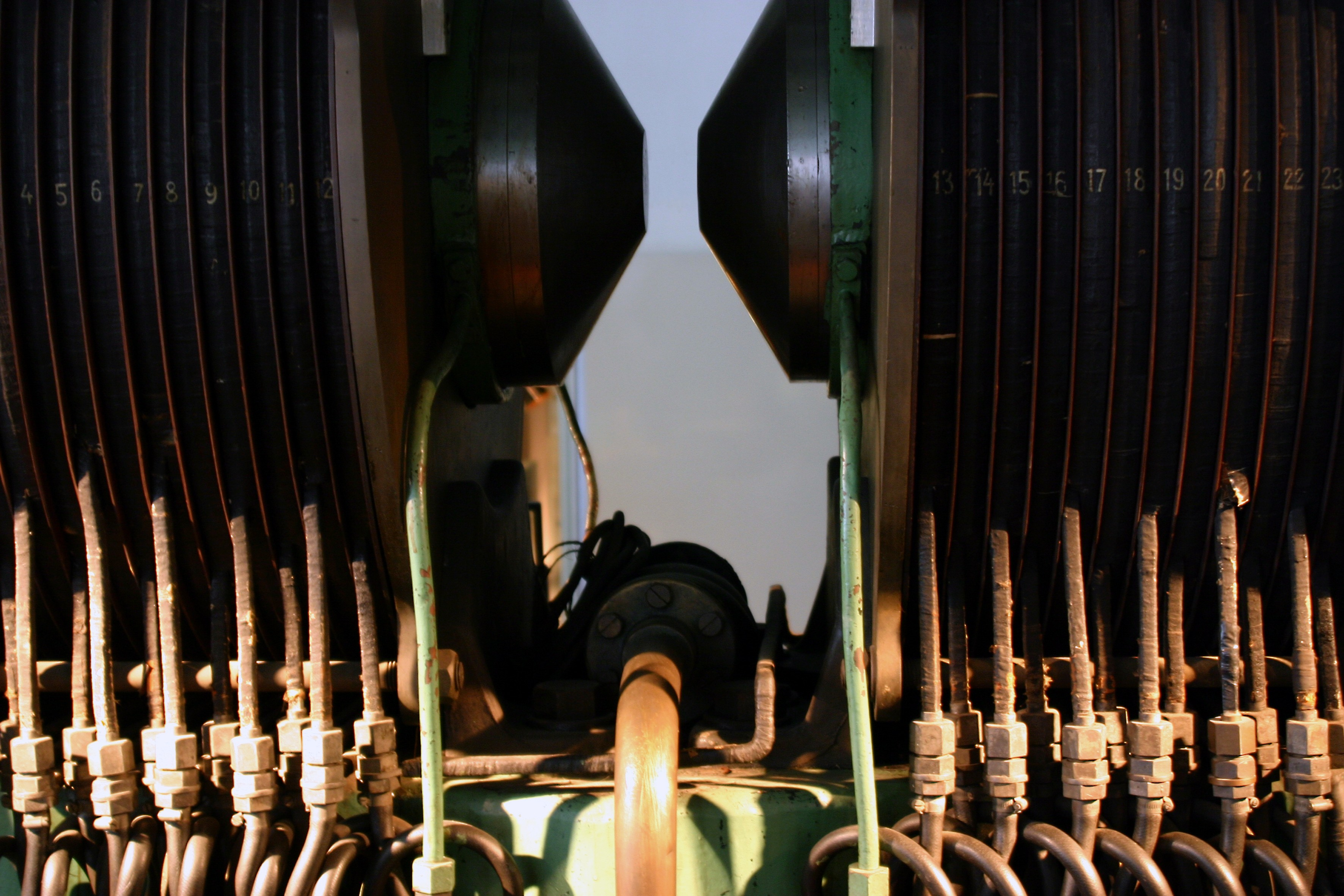
Giant Electromagnet 2.5 x 2.5 x 2 meters

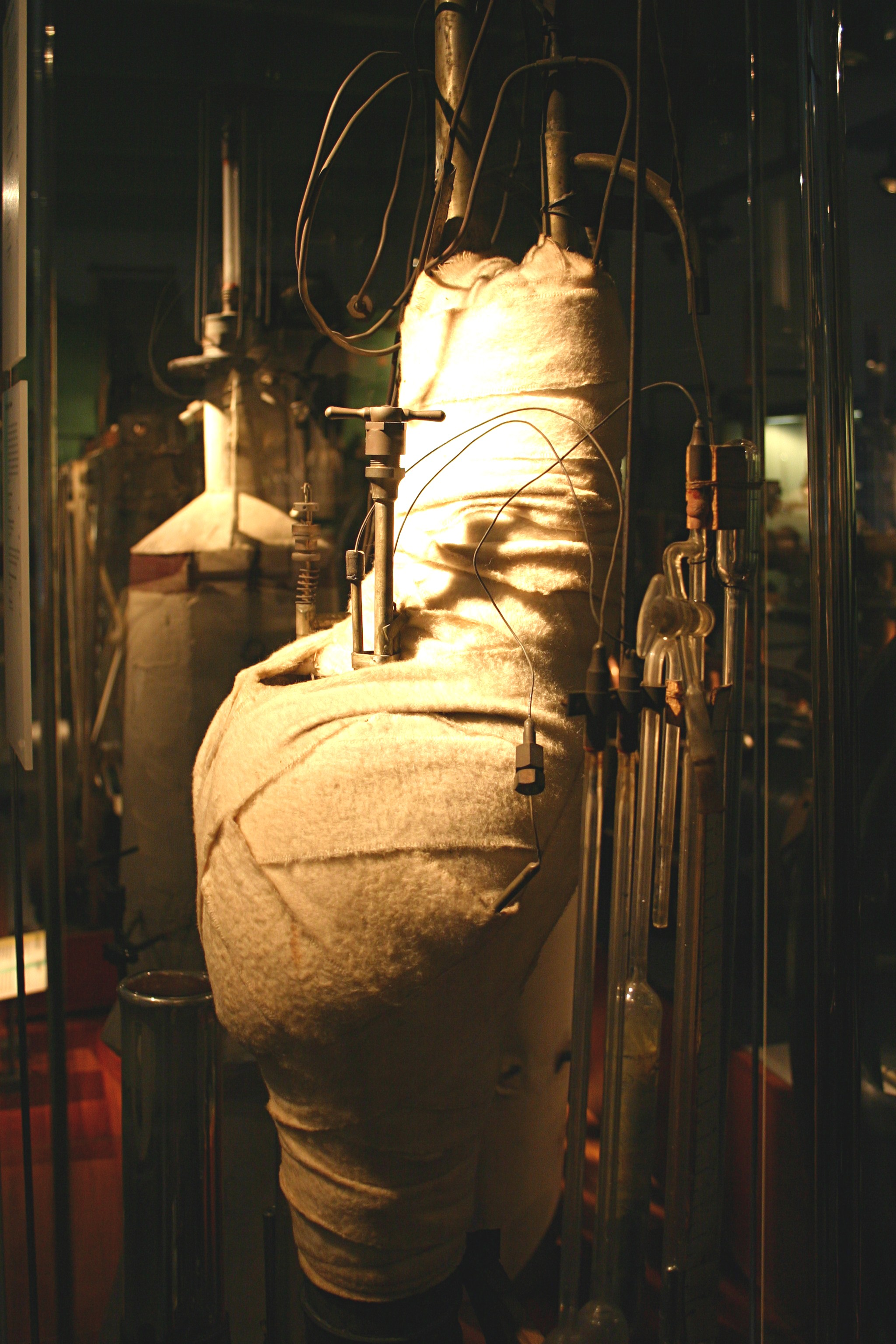
Helium liquefier (detail)

On display are a helium liquefier and associated tools, devices to measure superconductivity (e.g. rheostats), and to automatically record measurements: a cathode tube, a thermograph, drum recorders and a paper tape recorder.

Also large (from today's perspective) devices, mostly made from wood and copper, to measure and display electricity (1900–1930): volt meters, a resistance box, radio valves, a universal bridge, mirror galvanometers, a quadrant electrometer .

Apparatuses to study radiation: a Wilson cloud chamber, an electrometer with ionization chamber, X-ray, cathode-ray and canal ray tubes, a fluorescent lamp.

Equipment to study the properties of light (and radio waves in general), including the wave–particle duality (most 1900–1910): a slit, a polarizer, a photo-electric cell, a Fresnel double mirror, lenses, an induction coil, a photosensitive resistor, a spectroscope, an oscillograph, a Wireless receiver, a microphone, standards of self-induction.

Also Zeeman's Nobel Prize diploma and medal and a lab diary, an electromagnet with polar pieces, 3D plaster models to visualize thermodynamic properties (e.g. phase transitions).

22 Medicine: Man as a machine

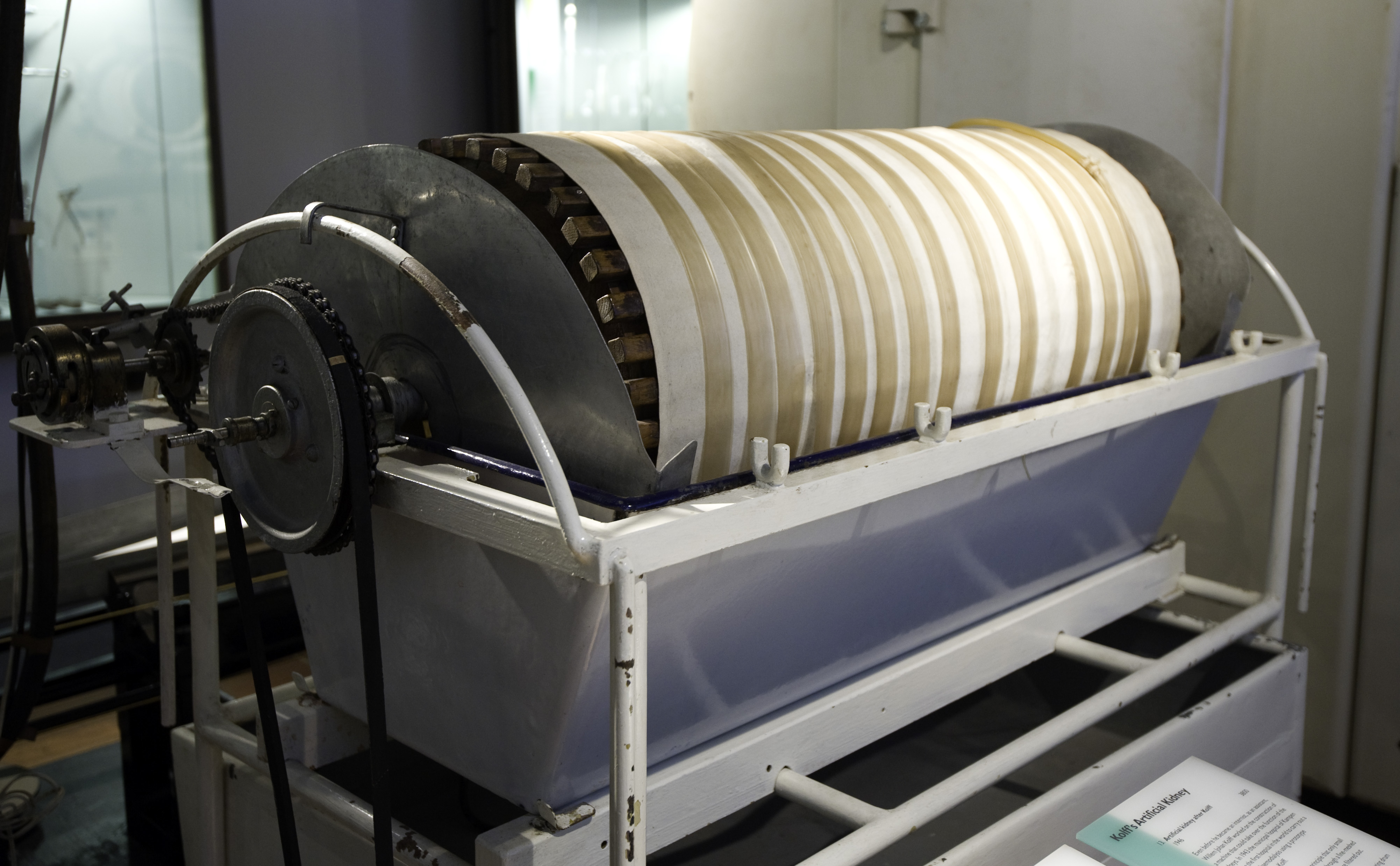
Kolff's Artificial Kidney

Pieces at display include: a gigantic microtome, the first heart-lung machine (prototype) by inventor Jacob Jongbloed (1948), the first kidney dialysis machine by inventor Willem Johan Kolff, X-ray equipment, an iron lung, galvanometer tools, a bow and arrow used to draw ultra thin quartz fibres (by shooting away a droplet of molten quartz), the original golden Nobel Prize medal from Willem Einthoven (for developing the first practical electrocardiogram in 1903)

23 Astronomy: Celestial Accounting

24 Microscopy: New ways

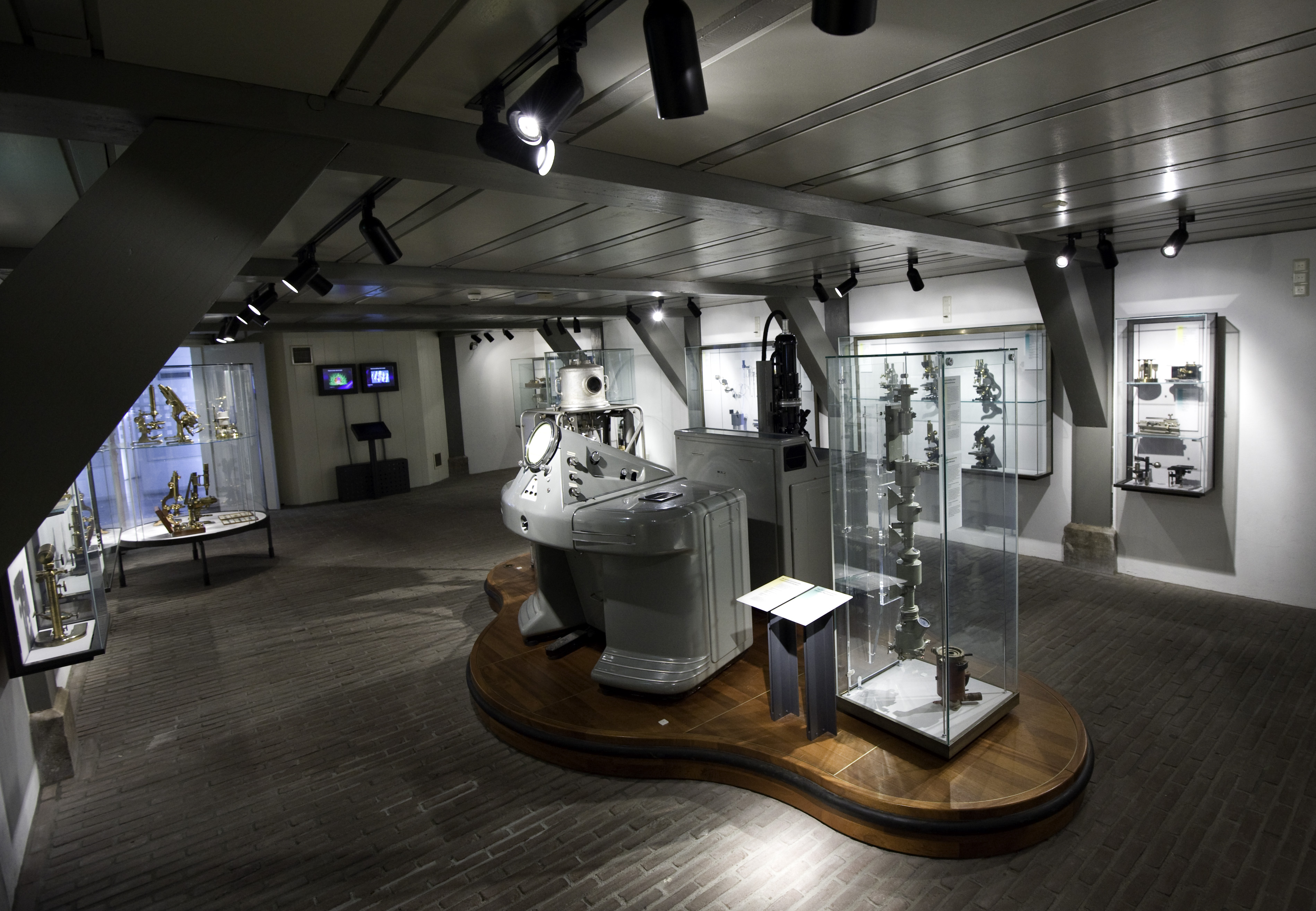
Room 24: Microscopy, new ways

The room houses two electron microscopes (1947–1950) and related equipment (gold vaporiser, lens, object holders, a cooler, a goniometer), a collection of compound and specimen microscopes (some binocular) (1840–1870) plus accompanying microscope lamps and a tool box, a binocular polarisation microscope (1850), several microtomes (a.o. a cryomicrotome) and ultramicrotomes, a phase contrast microscope, a fluorescence microscope (plus several epi-illuminators, to exploit the difference between emitted and reflected light frequencies that some substances display), compound microscope with transformer in camera installation, a photomicroscope (photo camera with inverted microscope), a boxed collection of microscopic specimens (1870).

The museum also contains a fountain pen that was gifted in 1921 by Albert Einstein to Paul Ehrenfest, then the director of the physics faculty of Leiden University. This pen was gifted to Ehrenfest as a thank you gift for the friendship that he and Einstein shared, and because Ehrenfest created a professorship for Einstein. Einstein was a 'bijzonder hoogleraar', meaning a professor by special appointment made possible by the Leids Universiteits Fonds from 1920 up to officially 1946. In the first half of his appointment he visited Leiden regularly to give lectures.

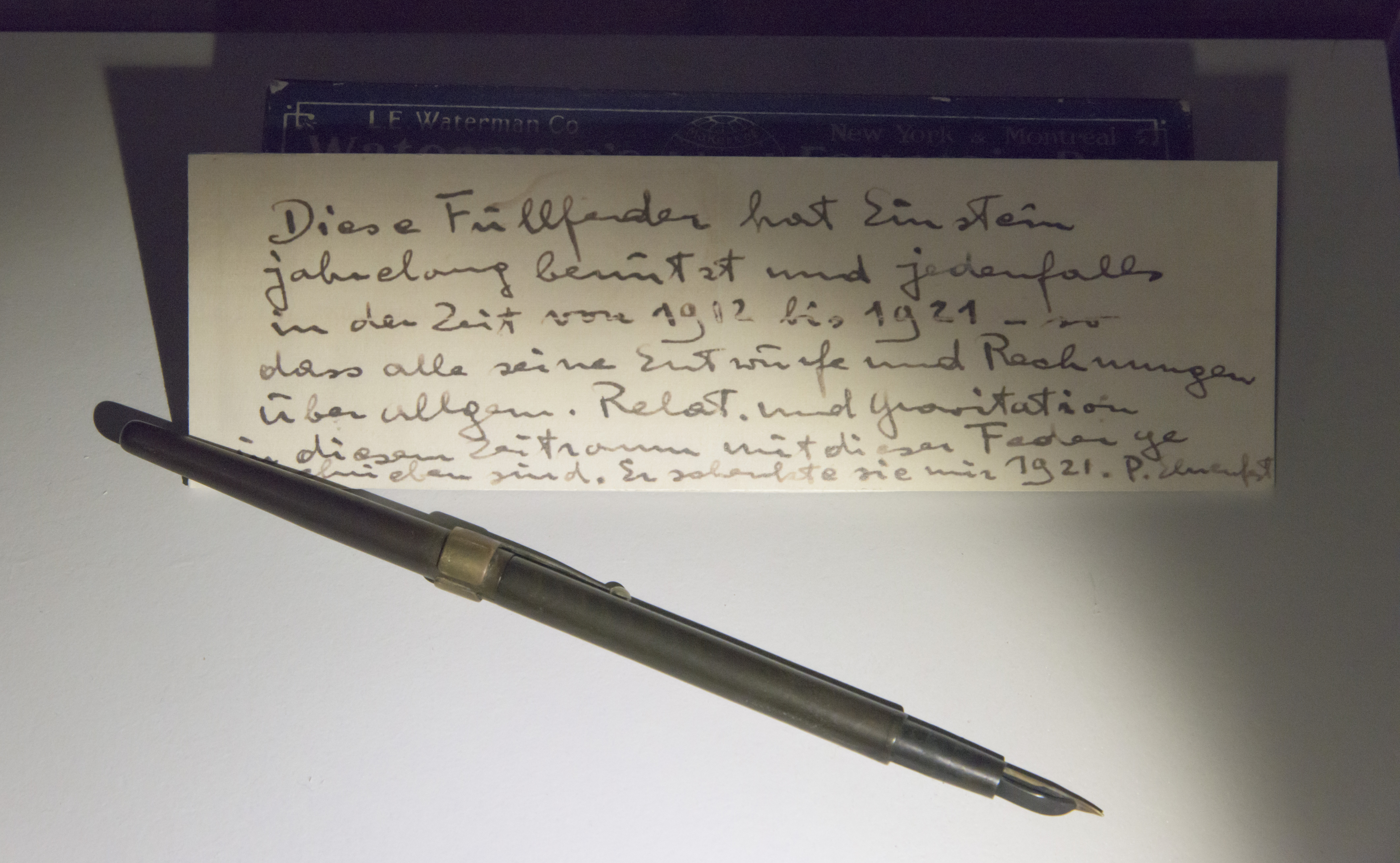
Leiden Museum Boerhaave Einstein Pen

There is a note with the pen on which is written (In German): 'This pen has been used for years by Einstein, especially during the time between 1912 and 1921 – So that all his designs and calculations relating to general relativity and gravity from this time period are written with this pen. He gave this pen to me in 1921. P. Ehrenfest. '
