= Georg Matthias Bose =

German electrical experimenter (1710–1761)

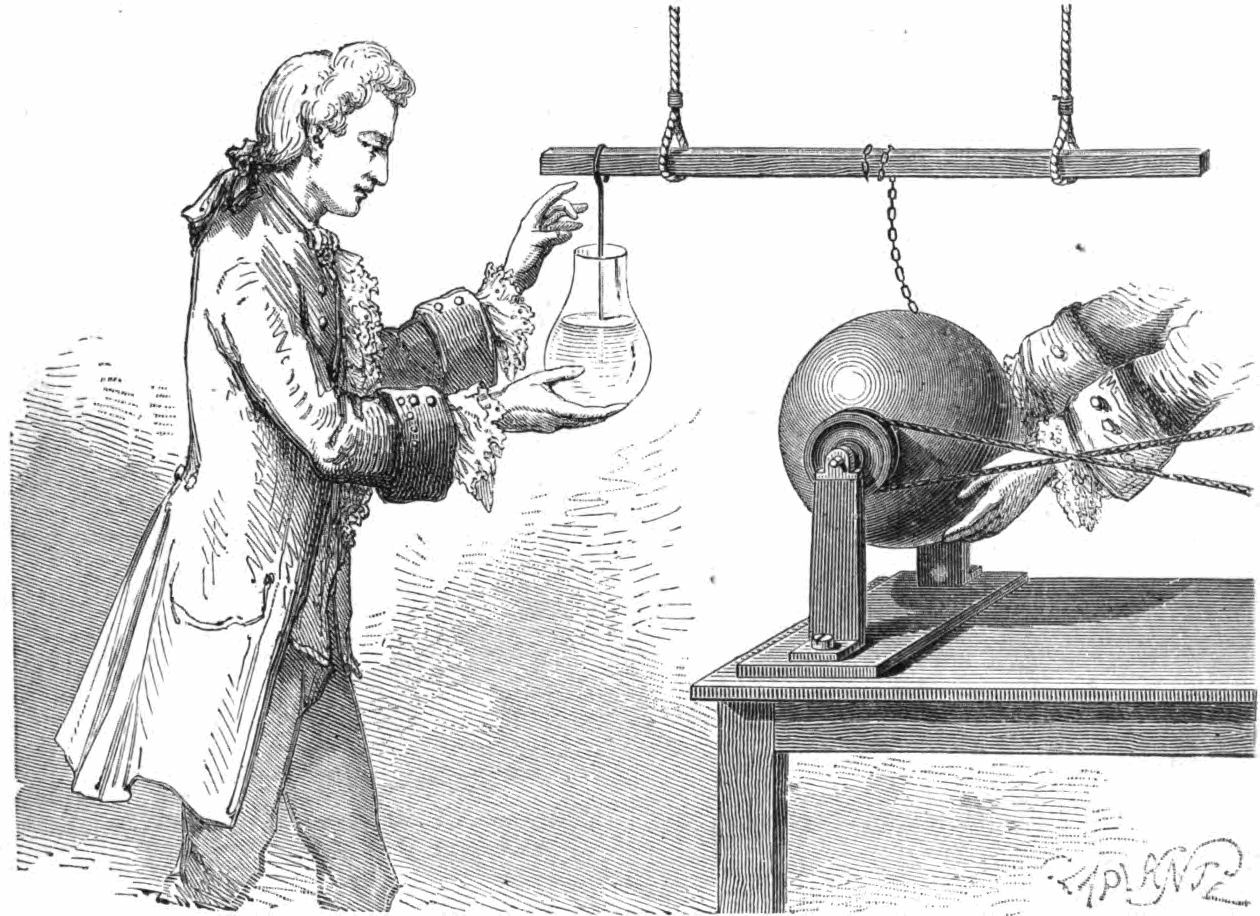
A Leyden jar being charged from a Prime Conductor

Georg Matthias Bose (22 September 1710 – 17 September 1761), also known as Mathias Bose, was an electrical experimenter in the early days of the development of electrostatics. He is credited with being the first to develop a way of temporarily storing static charges by using an insulated conductor (called a prime conductor). His demonstrations and experiments raised the interests of the German scientific community and the public in the development of electrical research.

== Early life ==
He was born the son of a merchant and educated at the University of Leipzig, in the Electorate of Saxony, receiving his master's degree in 1727. In 1738, he became the professor of natural philosophy at the University of Wittenberg. As part of his course in physics, he revived experimentation with a glass-globe machine following the design of Francis Hauksbee the Elder, and he later vastly improved on the machine by adding a "prime conductor" which allowed the machine to accumulate the generated static charge at a higher level.

He was said to be a flamboyant demonstrator and an assiduous self-promoter, and he corresponded extensively with the Royal Society in London and with similar groups in Prussia, France, Italy and even Istanbul.

== Prime conductor ==
Bose's initial prime conductor consisted of an assistant standing on a block of resin (an effective insulator) holding a metal bar in one hand while touching the spinning globe with the other. The friction-generated charge would have flowed through the assistant to the metal bar and accumulated on the external surface of the bar. In effect, this was an extension of Stephen Gray's 1730 Flying Boy demonstration, but with the addition of a metal conductor which, over time, became the only effective storage device.

What was novel was Bose's use of metal (the bar) at a time when it had long been accepted that only insulators (then called "electrics") could successfully accumulate static electricity. Metal conductors were known to dissipate any charge relatively quickly and the need to insulate charged objects from electrical contact with the earth was not well appreciated. Later experiments by other experimenters showed that it was not the mass of the prime conductor which set the limit of static accumulation so much as its exterior dimensions—since like-charges repel and so the cumulative effect only exists on the external skin of the conductor.

For three years, from 1742 to 1745, Bose promoted the study of electricity in Germany, and became famous for spectacular experiments including one where he set alight alcoholic spirits floating on the surface of water via a spark generated by his friction machine which passed through the water. Since water and fire were seen as direct opposites, this created a minor sensation among the observers and became widely mentioned in scientific correspondence.

=== Electric Kiss ===
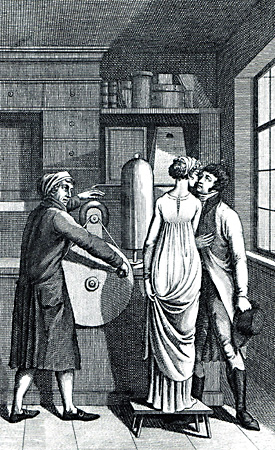
The Electric Kiss demo

Bose's "Electric Kiss" (also called "Electric Venus") demonstration was immensely popular with spectators, and it was little more than a variation on Stephen Gray's "Flying Boy" demonstration. An attractive young lady was invited to stand on a block of insulating resin, and she was given a moderate static charge from a spinning globe. A young man from the audience was then invited to give her a kiss, and, in the process, the pair received a reasonable shock.

This demonstration combined both the scientific illustration of charge accumulation with the naughtiness of a stolen kiss, so it became a mainstay of all electrical showmen and scientific demonstrators.

=== Beatification ===
One of the public demonstrations developed by Bose became known as "Beatification", and Bose purposefully concealed the means by which he generated the effect. Eventually he was accused of fabrication, and so he revealed the technique to a colleague who published it in the Royal Society's Philosophical Transactions.

In essence this was an extension of his Prime Conductor developments. A person dressed in a metal helmet or suit of armour would sit on a highly insulated chair and receive a high level of static charge—enough to produce sparkling points and possibly plasma glows around conductive surfaces. Bose eventually admitted to exaggeration, and explained the effect:

Now, sir, it is true that I have embellished a little my beatification by my style and expressions; but it is also true, that the basis of the phenomenon is constant. I found in our armoury at Leipzic, [sic] a whole suit of armour, which was decked with many bullions of steel: some pointed like a nail: others in form like a wedge; others pyramidal. In the dark, you well know, that not all, but very many, of the said bullions will sparkle and glister with tails like comets: and it is clear, that when the electricity is very vigorous, the helmet on the head of the person electrized will dart forth rays like those round the head of a canonized saint; and that is my beatification.

=== Leyden jar ===
The news of Bose's alcohol experiment quickly spread to Pomerania, a small independent state on the Baltic coast, where the dean of the Camin cathedral was also experimenting with a friction generator. Ewald Georg von Kleist had suspended a large stove-pipe above his machine on silk threads which, by coincidence rather than design, turned out to be the best possible shape and mass for a prime conductor in its ability to accumulate charge.

Von Kleist wondered whether Bose's experiment at transmitting electricity through water to the flammable spirits would extend to capturing electricity in a small medicine bottle filled with alcohol, since he knew that the glass of the bottle would act as an insulator and prevent the electricity from escaping. He therefore fitted his bottle with a cork through which protruded a nail in contact with the fluid to provide a point of entry.

Holding the bottle in one hand, he applied the nail to the prime conductor. Nothing happened immediately, but while carrying the bottle back into a dark room he noticed a slight plasma glow which suggested to him that the alcohol was charged with St Elmo's fire. When he touched the nail with his spare hand he experienced a most violent shock. He said in correspondence that it threw him across the room.

Von Kleist had invented the Leyden jar, but he did not understand the significance of his cupped hand held around the outside of the bottle which provided the one exterior conductive element needed to allow the Leyden jar to accumulate a massive amount of charge.

Having experienced such a shock, he was naturally loath to hold the bottle in his hand again and he seems not to have been able to duplicate the experiment. When he advised his scientific correspondents, they were also naturally very wary of holding the jar, and for some time they failed to duplicate the experiment. He is known to have corresponded his finding to a: Dr Lieberkuhn in Berlin, Mr Winckler at Leipzig, Mr Świetlicki of Danzig and Mr Krugar of Hall as well as the professors of the academy of Liegnitz.

Von Kleist had been educated at the University of Leyden, and it is now widely assumed that he would also have corresponded with fellow ex-students Andreas Cunaeus (a lawyer), and Prof. Jean Allamand (professor of theology) at the University. Allamand attempted to duplicate the experiment with a glass of beer and eventually succeeded.

Cunaeus and Allamand worked occasionally with the professor of physics at Leyden University, Pieter van Musschenbroek, on new electrical experiments, and it took time for them to discover the secret. They finally worked out the importance of the outside conduction surface provided by the hand, which was needed to prevent the development of electrostatic backpressure, and, as a result, it was the Leyden University experimenters who received the bulk of the credit.

=== Loss of Manuscripts ===
In 1744, Bose published his major works on electricity in the form of pamphlets released in London and Paris. However, many of his manuscripts were later lost. He is now mainly celebrated for his spectacular demonstrations rather than for his scientific contributions. In 1757 he was elected a Fellow of the Royal Society of London.

In 1760, during the Seven Years' War with Prussia, Bose was kidnapped from Wittenberg as a strategic asset, and taken to Magdeburg where he was held as a hostage. This, ironically, was the site of Otto von Guericke's famous sulphur ball experiment. He died at Magdeburg two years later.

=== Published works ===
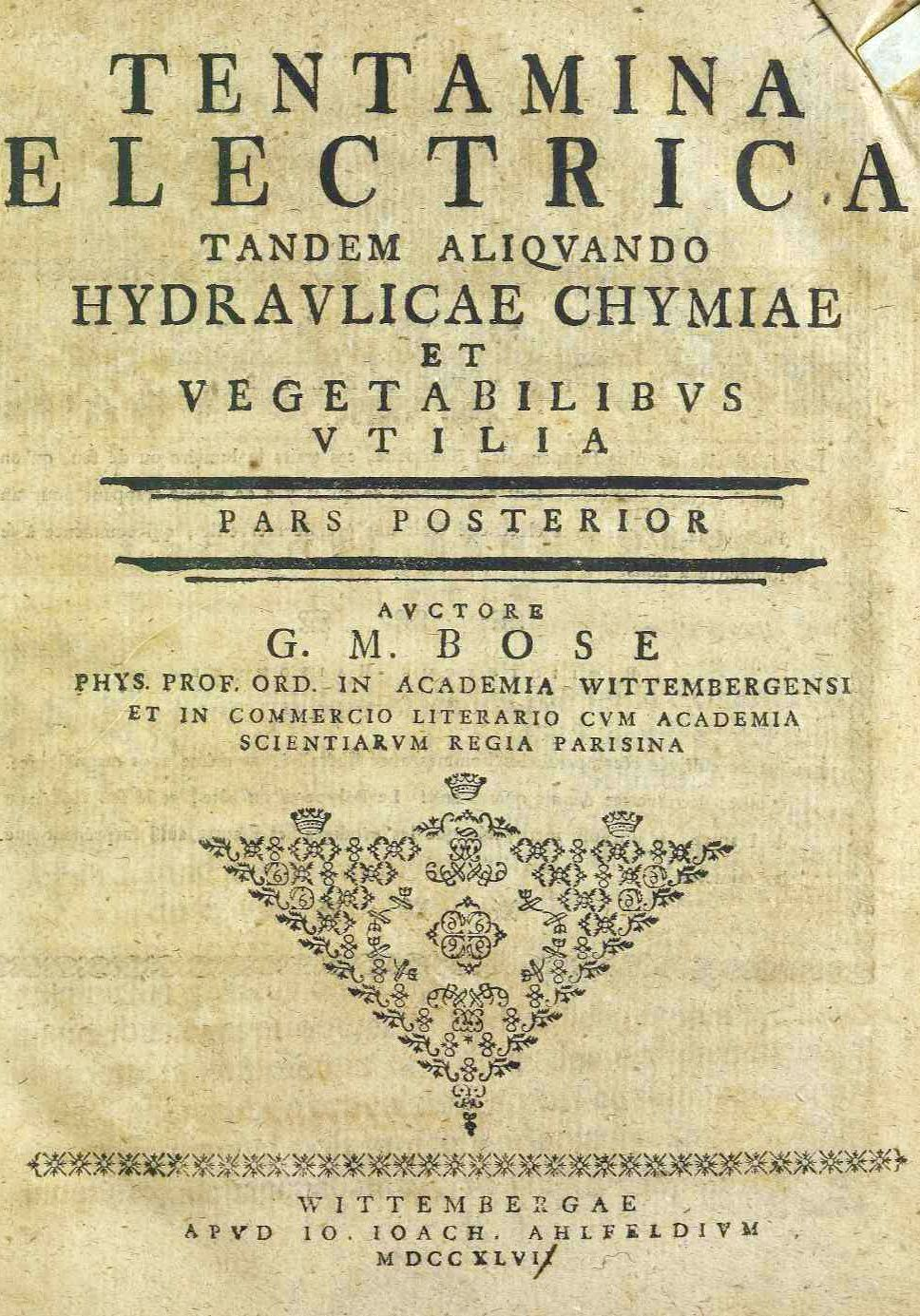
Tentamina electrica, 1747

- Tentamina electrica in academiis regiis Londensi et Parisina primum habita omni studio repetita quae novis aliquot accessionibus locupletavit. (Wittenberg, 1744). This is a reprint of his inaugural oration and two other pamphlets.
- Die electricität nach ihrer Entdeckung und Fortgang mit poetischer Feder entworfen. (Wittenberg, 1744)

(in French) L'électricité son origine et ses progrès. Poème en deux livres. (Leipzig, 1754)

- Recherches sur la cause et sur la véritable téorie de l’électricité (Wittenberg, 1745) This contains his electrical theory which suggested (like Abbé Nollet) that the phenomenon was dependent on the active flow of a fluid.
- Tentamina electrica tandem aliquando hydraulicae chymiae et vegetabilibus utilia. (Wittenberg, 1747)
