= LeydenJar Technologies =

Dutch battery company

LeydenJar Technologies B.V.
- Company type: Private
- Industry: Batteries
- Founded: 2016 in Leiden, the Netherlands
- Founder: Christian Rood, Gabriel de Scheemaker
- Headquarters: Leiden, Netherlands
- Key people: Christian Rood, Ashley Cooke
- Products: battery anodes
- Number of employees: 90
- Website: https://leyden-jar.com/

LeydenJar Technologies B.V. is a deep tech company that specializes in technologies for electric batteries. It was founded in 2016 and is based in Leiden, the Netherlands.

LeydenJar Technologies was founded as a spin-off of the Dutch scientific research organisation TNO. The name LeydenJar stems from the 18th-century Leyden jar, which was invented in Leiden.

Originally, LeydenJar Technologies was working on a technology to deposit silicon as plasma for solar cells, which wasn't successful. It was found to work for making anodes for lithium-ion batteries, giving an energy density advantage, with a reduced production complexity and energy cost.

Application of such batteries can vary from consumer electronics to electric cars and airplanes. LeydenJar Technologies has planned a production facility in Eindhoven to produce anodes for these, using an investment of 23 million euros (US$26.7 million), intended to be ready in 2027.

In October 2025, LeydenJar Technologies reached an agreement with the Chinese battery manufacturer Highpower Technology for production of batteries with LeydenJar anodes to be shipped as OEM parts from the Netherlands to China.
