= Zuppa Geo Navigation =

Indian Drone Manufacturer

Zuppa Geo Navigation Technologies
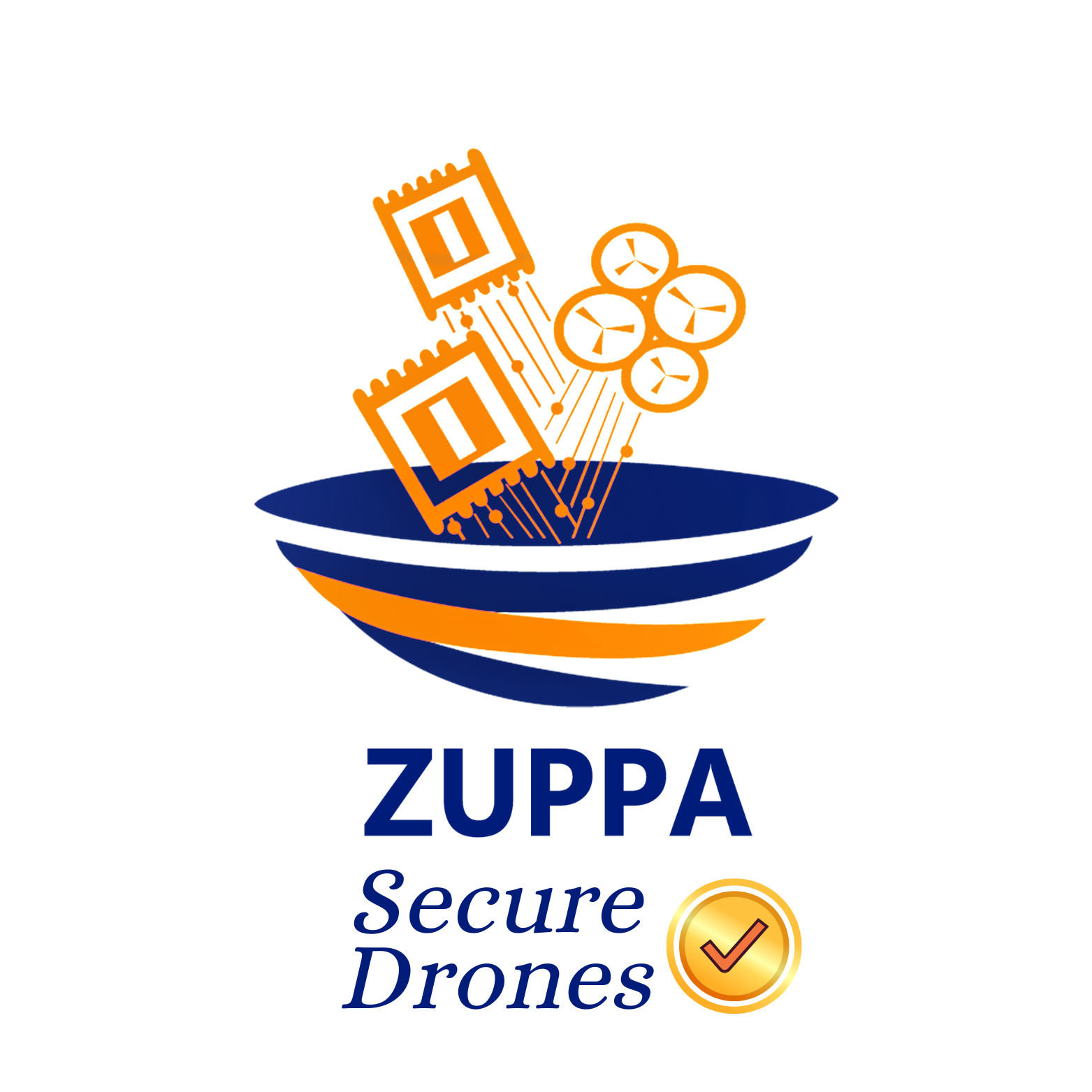
- Founded: 2008
- Founder: Sai Pattabiram and Venkatesh Sai
- Headquarters: Chennai, India
- Area served: Worldwide
- Key people: Sai Pattabiram (Co-founder & Managing Director) and Venkatesh Sai (Co-founder & Technical Director)
- Website: zuppa.io

Zuppa is an Indian Deep tech drone company with capabilities in development and manufacturing of Drones, Autopilots for Unmanned Systems, Unmanned combat aerial vehicle, Vehicle tracking systems & Navigation systems for defence and commercial uses.

It is headquartered in Chennai, Tamil Nadu. Customers include the Indian Army, foreign governments, commercial enterprises and state and local government agencies.

Zuppa is one of six global companies that manufacture micro-drones for the Indian infantry and force, It is one of only seven companies worldwide to possess its own autopilot technology.

== History ==
Zuppa was established in 2008 by Sai Pattabiram and Venkatesh Sai in Chennai, Tamil Nadu.

In 2015, Zuppa patented its Disseminated Parallel Control Computing (DPCC) AI technology. DPCC is a bio mimicry of the human brain is AI in action. It is a core computing architecture that controls the unmanned system exactly like a human.

Zuppa has been working with the Army as an industry partner in formulating a cybersecurity framework for drones, ensuring indigenous technologies meet the stringent requirements of modern warfare. The company also supplied such drones to the Indian Army, which cannot be hijacked.

After Operation Sindoor, Zuppa received Rs.12 crore funding to scale its fully indigenous Drones and Electronics Ajeet Mini.

In June 2025, Indian Army partnered with Zuppa to setup a Drone MRO and training lab at Madras Regiment.

In October 2025, Zuppa and QuBeats partnered to develop Next-Generation Quantum Navigation System for Defence applications.

In November 2025, Zuppa partnered with German-based deep tech company 'Eighth Dimension'. Zuppa also collaborated with Divide By Zero Technologies to develop frontline drone fabrication unit.

Zuppa has partnered with the Indian Institute of Science, Bengaluru, to establish a Drone Centre of Excellence (CoE) at the Department of Mechanical Engineering.

== Operations ==
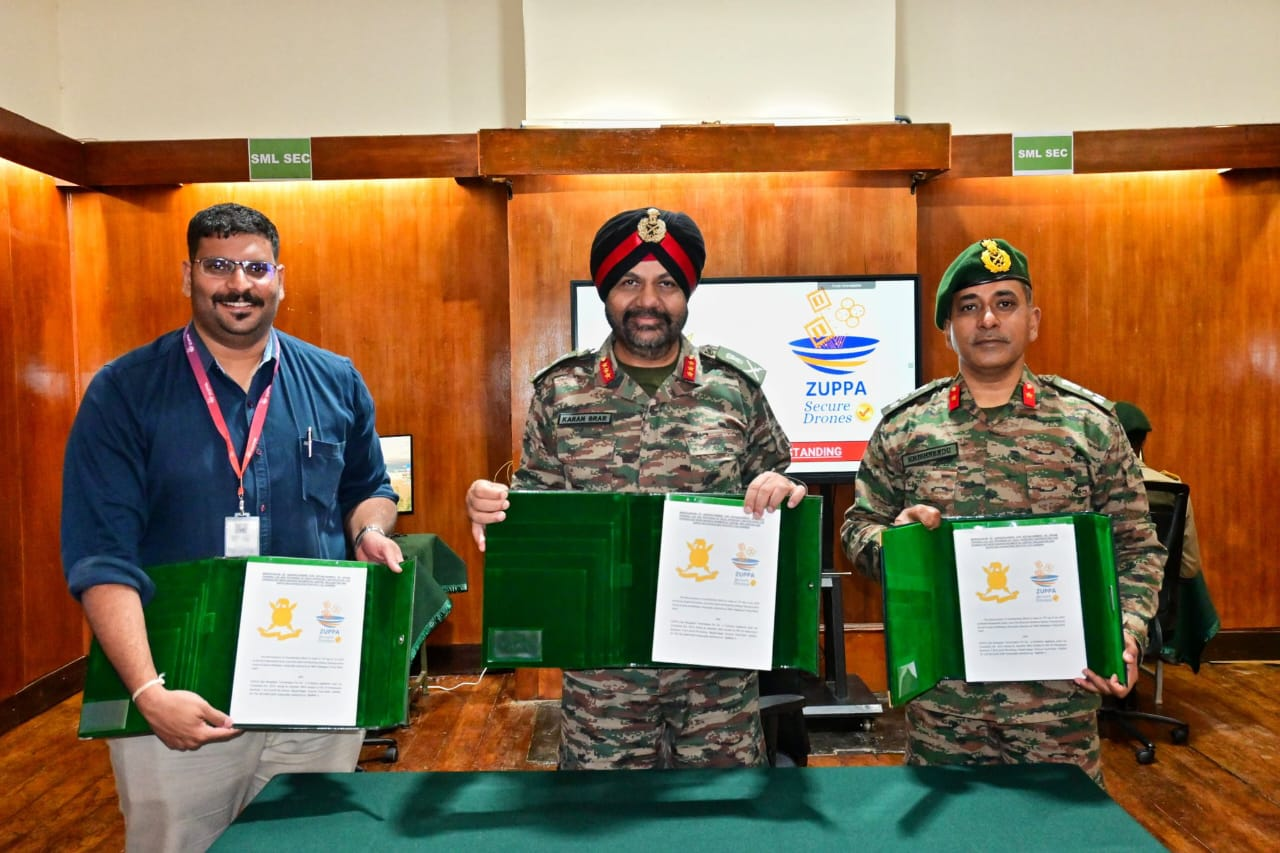
Lieutenant General Karanbir Singh Brar and Venkatesh Sai signed a MoU to launch MRO Lab at the Madras Regimental Centre (MRC) in Wellington, Tamil Nadu

The company has expanded its operations from India to European countries to accelerate its growth and develop advanced drone technologies.

== Surveillance ==
=== Operation Sindoor ===
Zuppa's drones used for surveillance played a crucial role during Operation Sindoor on 7 May 2025. The company's Hawk drones were used during the surveillance.

In April 2026, Zuppa delivered 500 security drones to Indian Army.

== Copyright ==
In November 2024, Zuppa discovered that a Chinese company had copied its patented technology to develop indigenous drones, which were subsequently exported to India. Following this, the Indian government took appropriate action regarding the alleged copyright and patent infringement.
