= Ewald Georg von Kleist =

German jurist, Lutheran cleric, and physicist

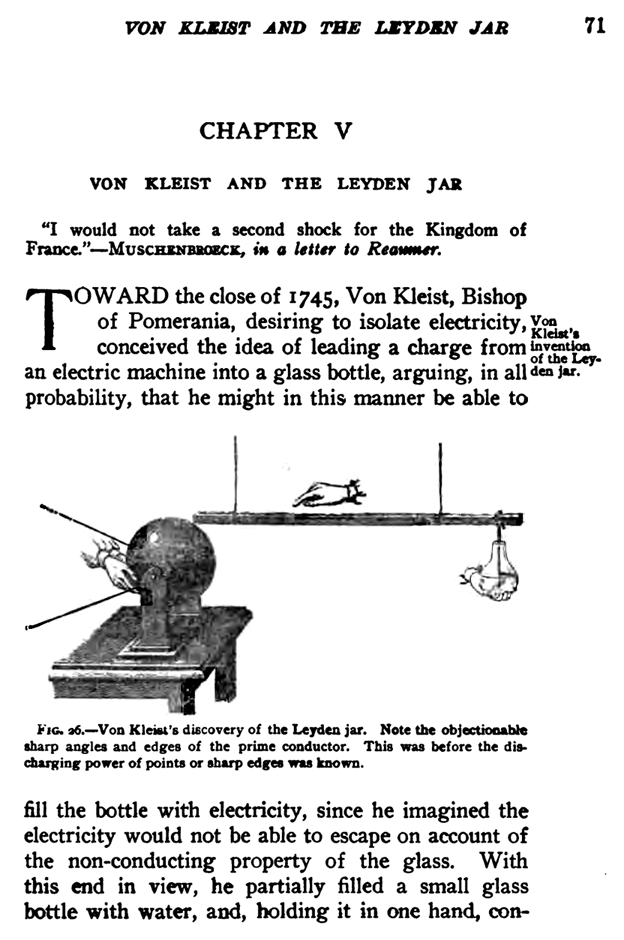
Description and drawing of Kleist's invention of the Leyden jar

Ewald Georg von Kleist (10 June 1700 – 11 December 1748), also known as Ewald Jürgen von Kleist, was a German jurist, Lutheran cleric, physicist and the inventor of the Leyden jar.

A member of the von Kleist family, Ewald was born in Vietzow in Farther Pomerania. His father was district administrator Ewald Joachim von Kleist (1657–1716). He studied jurisprudence at the University of Leipzig and the University of Leyden and may have started his interest in electricity at the latter university under the influence of Willem 's Gravesande. From 1722 to 1745 or 1747 he was dean of the Cathedral of St. John the Baptist in Cammin, in the Kingdom of Prussia, after which he became president of the royal court of justice in Köslin. He was a member of the Academy of Sciences in Berlin.

Influenced by Georg Matthias Bose, he independently invented the Kleistian jar on 11 October 1745, which could store electricity in large quantities. He communicated this discovery to a group of Berlin scientists in late 1745, and the news was transferred in a confused form to Leyden University where it was further investigated. This became more commonly known as the Leyden jar after 's Gravesande's graduate student Pieter van Musschenbroek of Leyden.
