= High Tech Campus Eindhoven =

High tech center in Eindhoven, Netherlands

Coordinates: 51°24′35″N 5°27′16″E

The High Tech Campus Eindhoven is a high tech center and R&D ecosystem on the Southern edge of the Dutch city of Eindhoven. As of 2024, this campus is home to 300 companies and institutions, comprising over 12,500 product developers, researchers and entrepreneurs and an estimated 85 nationalities. The Financial Times, Fortune, Forbes and others have praised the High Tech Campus Eindhoven (HTCE) as one of the best locations in the world for high-tech venture development and startup activity. As such, the HTCE is an innovation district, a targeted area with a huge potential for innovation and entrepreneurship.

== Origins and purpose ==
Philips was the original driving force behind the establishment of High Tech Campus Eindhoven. At the end of the 1990s, the R&D activities of the company (the Natuurkundig Laboratorium) were spread right across the city of Eindhoven, primarily in the Strijp area. In 1998, Philips established the Philips High Tech Campus to act as a single location for all its international R&D activities. To reinforce the interaction between people with different technical backgrounds, Philips decided to open up the campus to other companies in 2003, renaming it the High Tech Campus Eindhoven.

In March 2012 the Campus entered a new phase in its history. High Tech Campus Eindhoven was sold by Philips to Ramphastos Investments, a private consortium of investors led by Marcel Boekhoorn. Philips remains on the Campus as a tenant, but its status changed from owner/manager to resident. In 2021 the Campus was acquired by US-based Oaktree Capital Management

The campus attracts companies and research institutes engaging in advanced high-tech research and development. This includes research and development activity in the area of hightech systems, nanotechnology, embedded systems, smart pharma, life sciences, as well as security and encryption.

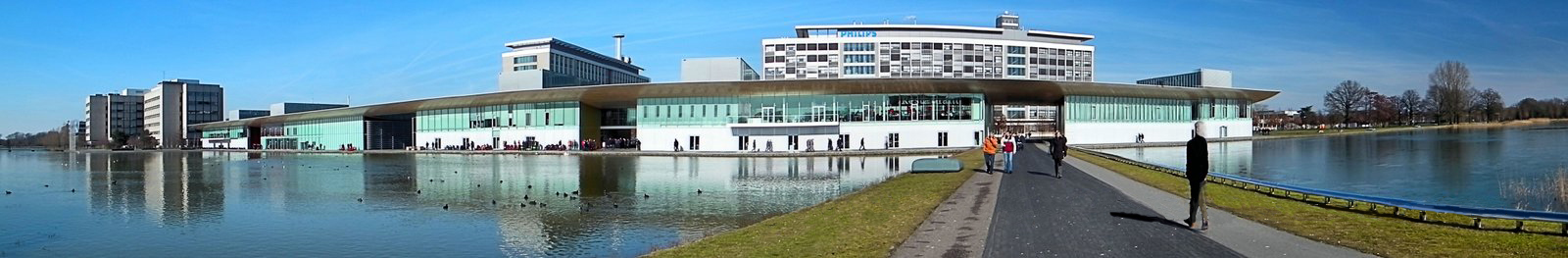
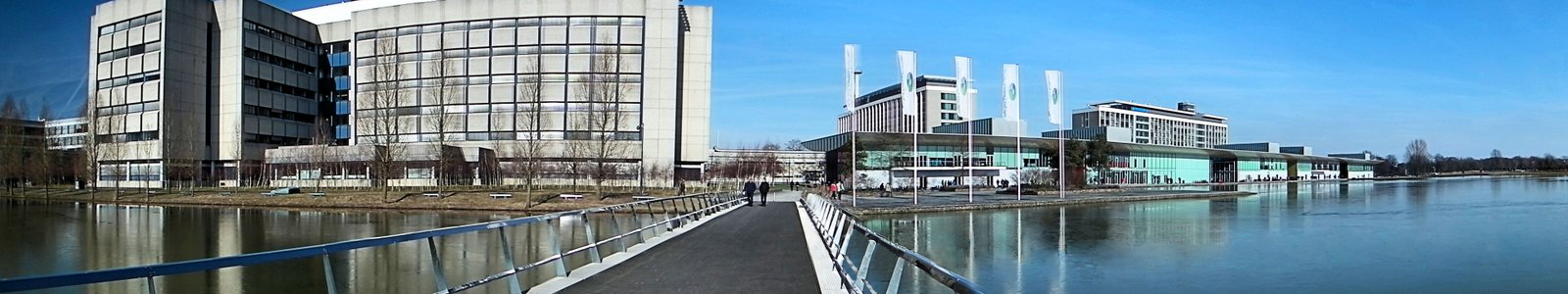

== Environment ==
The High Tech Campus is located on the grounds of the former Philips Research Laboratories Eindhoven (NatLab). When Philips sold the campus, opening it to other tenants, the facilities such as laboratories, cleanrooms, test facilities were opened up to other residents. Companies on campus include for example ABB, Accenture, Analog Devices, EFFECT Photonics, Intel, IBM, Philips Research, PhotonDelta, Atos Origin, Aquaver, FluXXion, Cytocentrics, NXP, Texas Instruments, and Dalsa.

The HTCE also hosts several publicly funded research institutes as well as collaborative entities such as Solliance, a cooperation between ECN, TNO, Holst Centre and TU/e, established to do research into thin film solar cells. Another example is EIT Digital, the knowledge and innovation community of the European Institute of Innovation and Technology (EIT) that has its Dutch co-location centre at the HTCE. EIT works with more than 200 European corporations, SMEs, start-ups, universities and research institutes. The HTCE also includes HighTechXL and many high-tech startups, scaleups, spinouts, and service providers

The campus is 1 km^{2} (0.39 sq mi) in size and includes 45,000 m^{2} (480,000 sq ft) of R&D facilities, 185,000 m^{2} (1,990,000 sq ft) office space. 6.000 m^{2} is used by technology start-ups and an area of 150,000 m^{2} (1,600,000 sq ft) is reserved for (re)development. The International Association of Science Parks ranks High Tech Campus in the top 17% of global science parks.

The campus is designed around a social hub known as The Strip. This houses the campus conference center, restaurants and shops and is designed to allow people from different companies and fields to meet.
