= Willem 's Gravesande =

Dutch mathematician and philosopher (1688–1742)

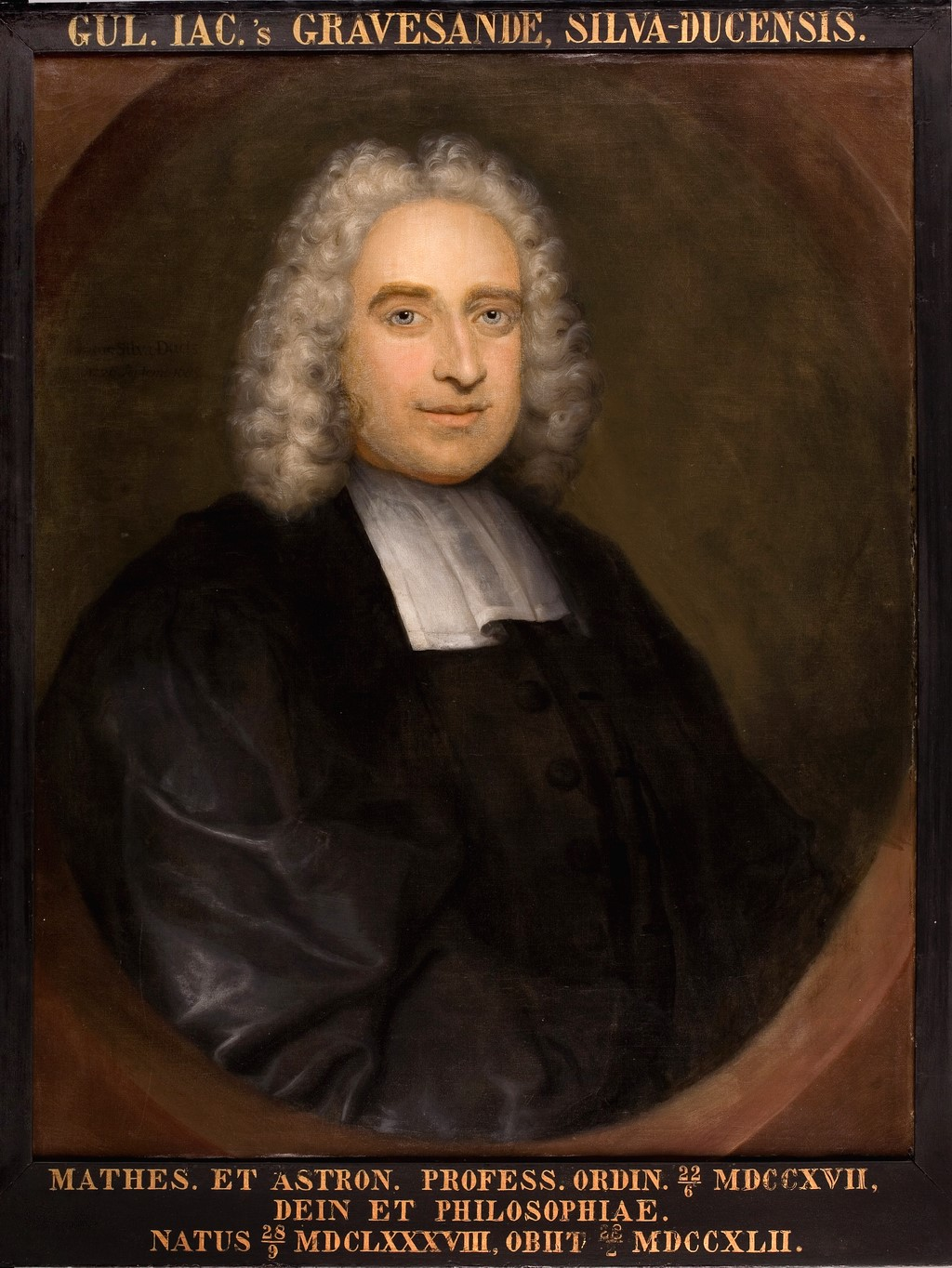
- Willem Jacob 's Gravesande (1688–1742)
- Born: 26 September 1688 's-Hertogenbosch, Duchy of Brabant
- Died: 28 February 1742 (aged 53); Leiden, Dutch Republic
- Education: Leiden University
- Known for: Experimental proof of $$E_k \propto \begin{matrix} \end{matrix} mv^2$$
- Scientific career
- Fields: Philosopher and mathematician
- Workplaces: Leiden University
- Doctoral advisor: Johannes Voet
- Doctoral students: Pieter van Musschenbroek, Jean Allamand

Willem Jacob 's Gravesande (26 September 1688 – 28 February 1742) was a Dutch mathematician and natural philosopher, chiefly remembered for developing experimental demonstrations of the laws of classical mechanics and the first experimental measurement of kinetic energy. As professor of mathematics, astronomy, and philosophy at Leiden University, he helped to propagate Isaac Newton's ideas in Continental Europe.

== Life ==
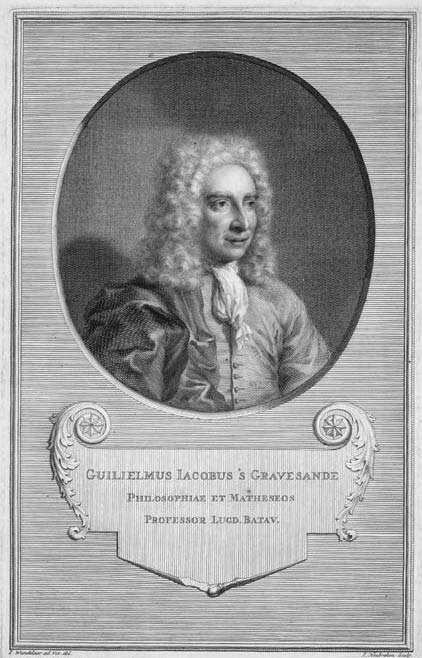
Portrait of Willem Jacob 's Gravesande. Etching by J. Houbraken, after a drawing by J. Wandelaar, 1725–1750.

Born in 's-Hertogenbosch, 's Gravesande studied law at Leiden University, where he defended a thesis on suicide and earned a doctorate in 1707. He then practised law in The Hague while also participating in intellectual discussions and cultivating his interest in the mathematical sciences. His Essai de perspective ("Essay on Perspective"), published in 1711, was praised by the influential Swiss mathematician Johann Bernoulli. In The Hague, 's Gravesande also helped to establish the Journal littéraire ("Literary journal"), a learned periodical first published in 1713.

In 1715, 's Gravesande visited London as part of a Dutch delegation sent to welcome the Hanoverian succession in Great Britain. In London, 's Gravesande met both King George I and Isaac Newton, and was elected a Fellow of the Royal Society. In 1717 he became professor of mathematics and astronomy in Leiden. From that position, he was instrumental in introducing Newton's work to the Netherlands. He also obtained the chairs of civil and military architecture in 1730 and philosophy in 1734. As a philosopher, he opposed fatalists like Hobbes and Spinoza and defended a concept of human liberty similar to that of Leibniz.

's Gravesande was married to Anna Sacrelaire in 1720. They had two sons, both of whom died in adolescence. In 1724, Peter the Great offered 's Gravesande a position in the new Imperial Saint Petersburg Academy of Sciences. In 1737 he received an offer from Frederick the Great to join the Prussian Academy of Sciences in Berlin. He declined both offers, opting to remain in Leiden.

== Mechanics ==
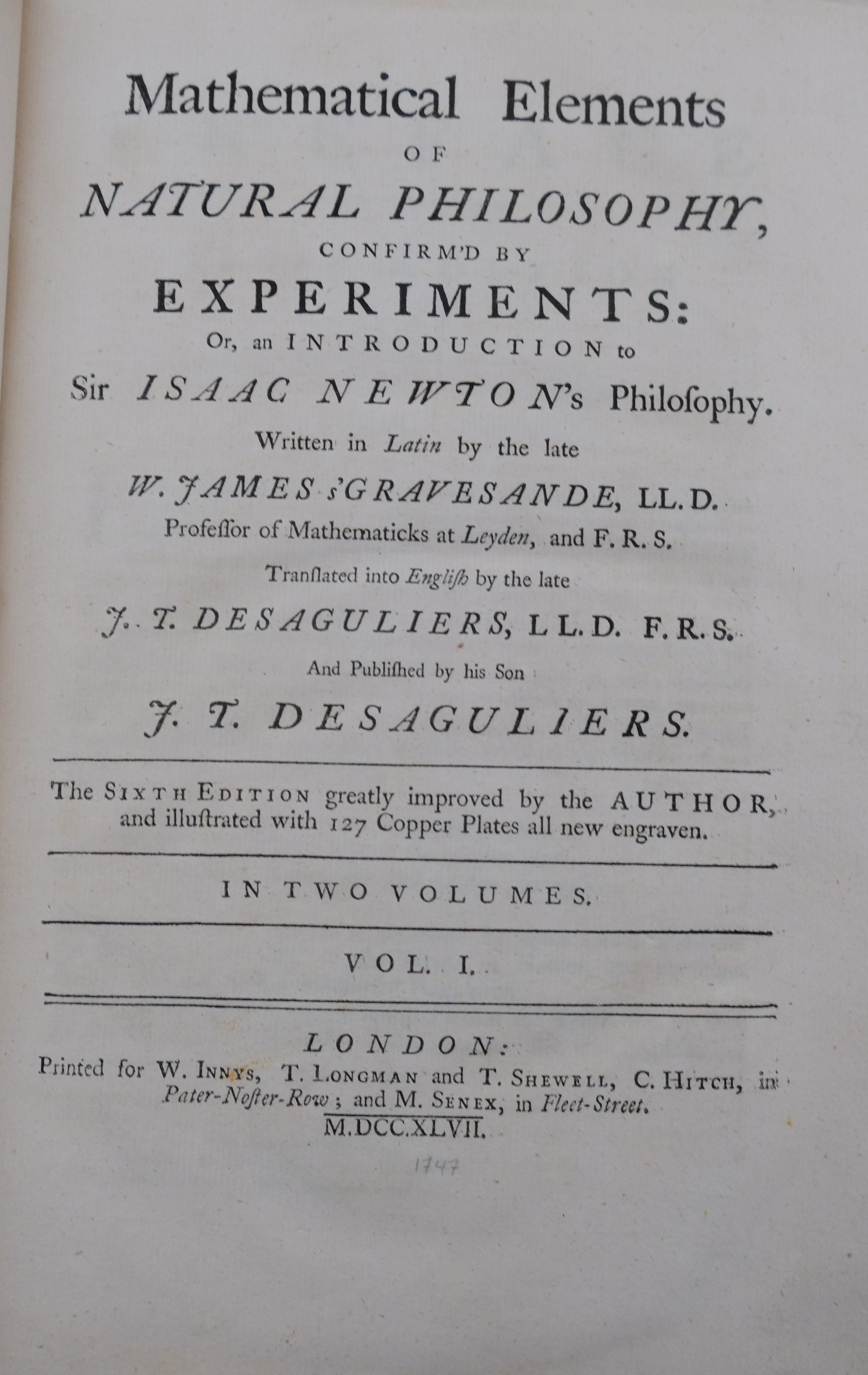
Title page of a 1747 copy of vol. 1 of Gravesande's "Mathematical Elements of Natural Philosophy"

Gravesande's main scientific work is Physices elementa mathematica, experimentis confirmata, sive introductio ad philosophiam Newtonianam ("Mathematical Elements of Natural Philosophy, Confirmed by Experiments; or, an Introduction to Newtonian Philosophy"), published in Leiden in 1720. In that book, he laid the foundations for the teaching of Newtonian mechanics through experimental demonstrations. He presented his work before audiences that included Voltaire, Albrecht von Haller, and Émilie du Châtelet (the translator of Newton's Principia whose later commentary incorporated 's Gravesande's 1722 experimental discovery of kinetic energy). 's Gravesande's book was soon translated into English by John Theophilus Desaguliers, curator of experiments for the Royal Society.

In 1721, 's Gravesande became involved in a public controversy over whether the German inventor Johann Bessler, known as Councillor Orffyreus, had created a genuine perpetual motion machine. 's Gravesande at first argued for the feasibility of perpetual motion based on the conservation of "force" interpreted as the scalar quantity mv (mass multiplied by speed), which he believed was implied by Newtonian mechanics. However, in 1722 he published the results of a series of experiments in which brass balls were dropped from varying heights onto a soft clay surface. He found that two balls of the same size and different masses would make identical indentations when the heights they were dropped from were inversely proportional to their masses, from which he concluded that the correct expression for the "force" of a body in motion is proportional to mv^{2} (which is proportional to the modern concept of kinetic energy).

Even though those results invalidated his original argument for the feasibility of perpetual motion, 's Gravesande continued to defend Bessler's work, claiming that Bessler might have discovered some new "active principle" of nature that allowed his wheels to keep turning. Similar views were defended at the time by Gottfried Wilhelm Leibniz, Johann Bernoulli, and others, but the modern consensus is that Bessler was perpetrating a deliberate hoax. Russian Tsar Peter the Great was interested in Bessler's wheel and sought 's Gravesande's advice on the subject.

's Gravesande communicated his results on the impact of falling weights to Émilie du Châtelet.{citation needed} Similar observations were published in 1718 by Giovanni Poleni. The interpretation of 's Gravesande's and Poleni's results led to a controversy with Samuel Clarke and other Newtonians that became a part of the so-called "vis viva dispute" in the history of classical mechanics.

== 's Gravesande's ring ==
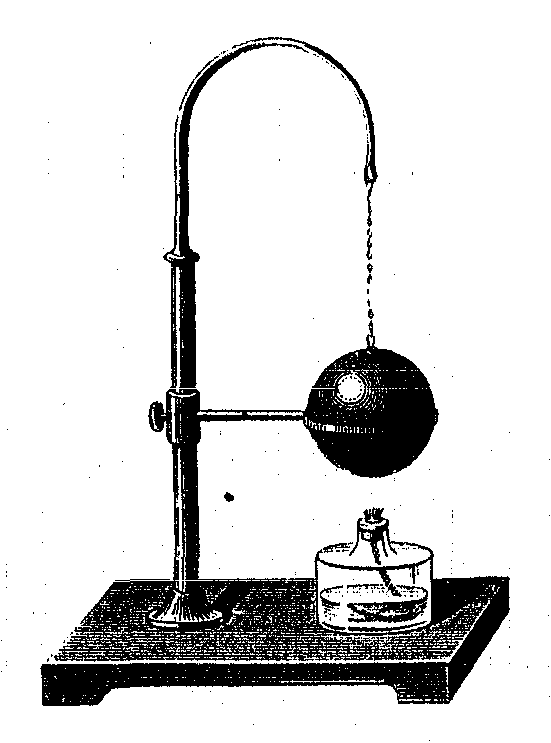
The ring of 's Gravesande

's Gravesande is also remembered for his invention of a simple experiment demonstrating thermal expansion, which has been used in physics education since. This is known today as "'s Gravesande's experiment" or "'s Gravesande's ring". The apparatus consists of a small metal ball on a chain or handle, and a metal ring on a stand. The ring is just big enough so that when the ring and ball are at the same temperature, the ball fits through the ring. However, if the ball is heated by dipping it into boiling water or playing the flame of a spirit lamp over it, the metal will expand, and the ball will no longer fit through the ring. When the ball has cooled down, it will fit through the ring again. This is 's Gravesande's own description of his experiment, under the heading "Of the Dilatation arising from Heat":

The Aperture of the Copper Ring ... is circular, and it's Diameter is an Inch and an half; and this is the Diameter of the solid Ball ..., which is made of the same Metal; this can pass through the Aperture, without leaving any sensible Interstice. When the Globe is heated it is sustained by the Ring, in whatever Position it is laid; which Experiment alone shews that Bodies dilate every Way [in every dimension?].

== Works ==
- Essai de perspective, 1711
- Philosophiae Newtonianae Institutiones, in usus academicos, 1723
- An essay on perspective, 1724
- Mathematical elements of physicks, prov'd by experiments : being an introduction to Sir Isaac Newton's philosophy, 1720
- Introductio ad Philosophiam, Metaphysicam et Logicam, 1736
- Mathematical Elements of Natural Philosophy, Confirm'd by Experiments: or, An introduction to Sir Isaac Newton's philosophy (Volume I), 1747 (first printed in 1720)
- Mathematical Elements of Natural Philosophy, Confirm'd by Experiments: or, An introduction to Sir Isaac Newton's philosophy (Volume II), 1747 (first printed in 1721)
- Oeuvres Philosophiques et Mathématiques de Mr. G. J. 'sGravesande, ed. with memoir by J. Allamand, 1774
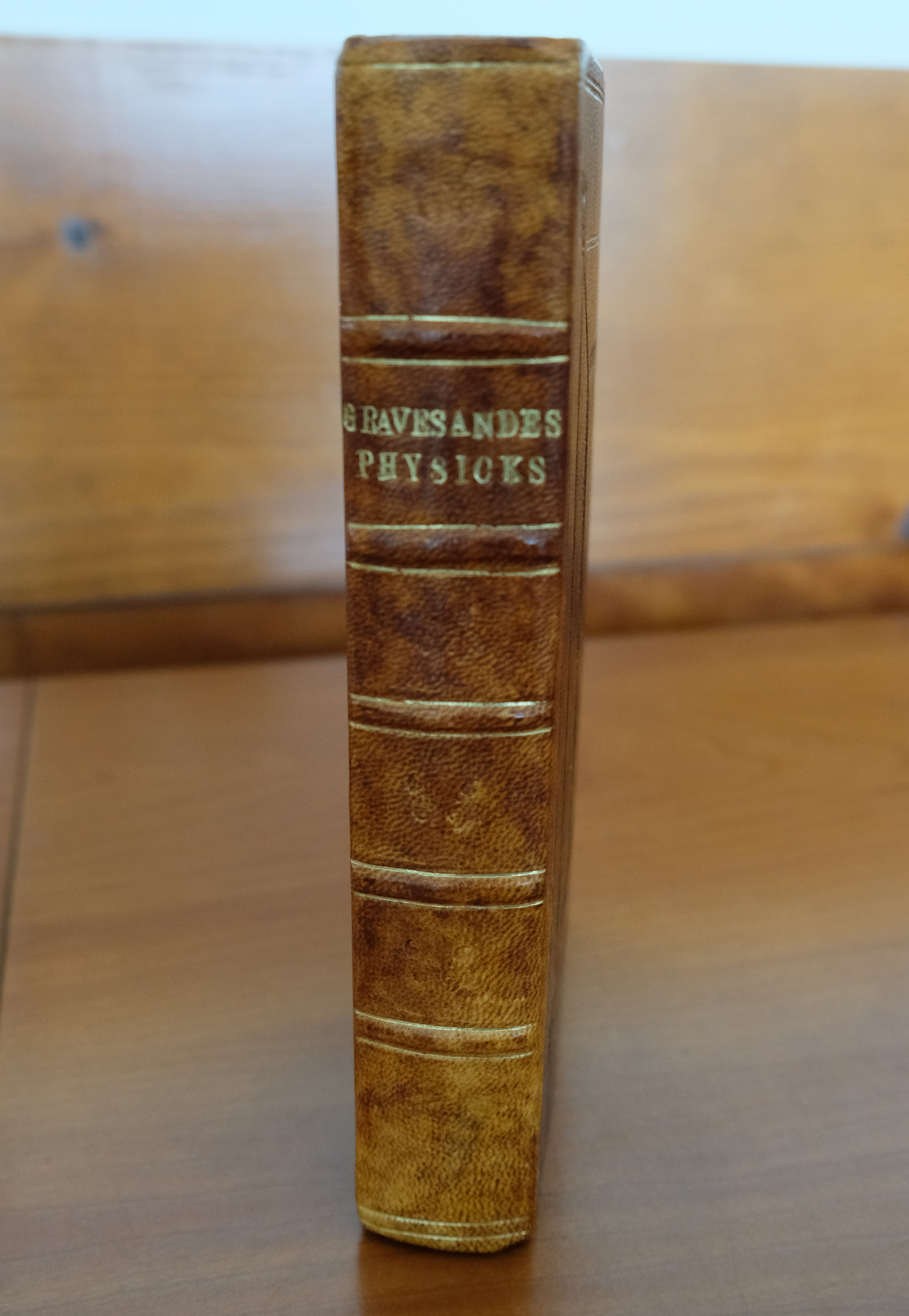
1720 copy of Gravesande's "Mathematical Elements of Physicks, Prov’d by Experiments"

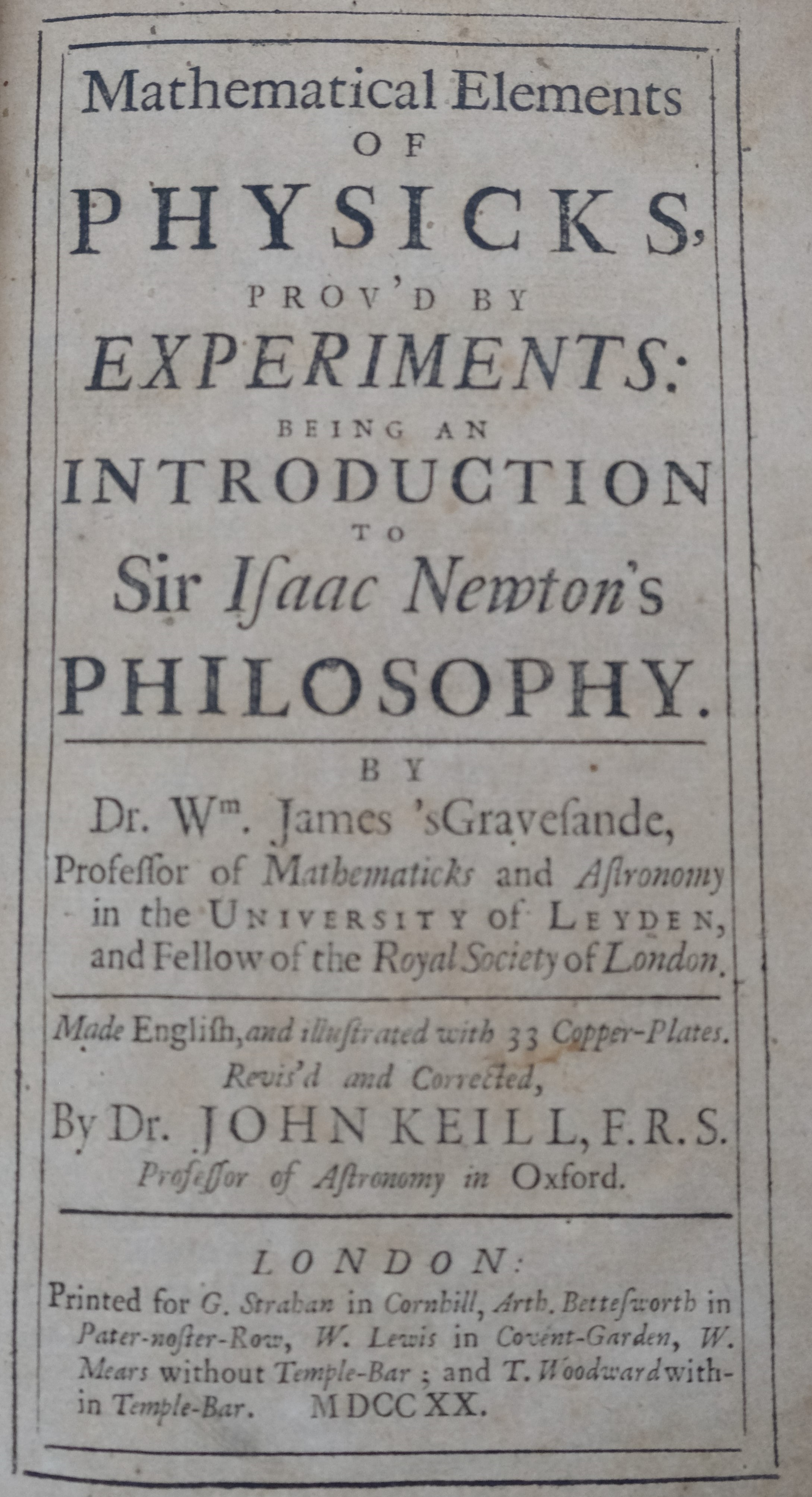
Title page of "Mathematical Elements of Physicks, Prov’d by Experiments"

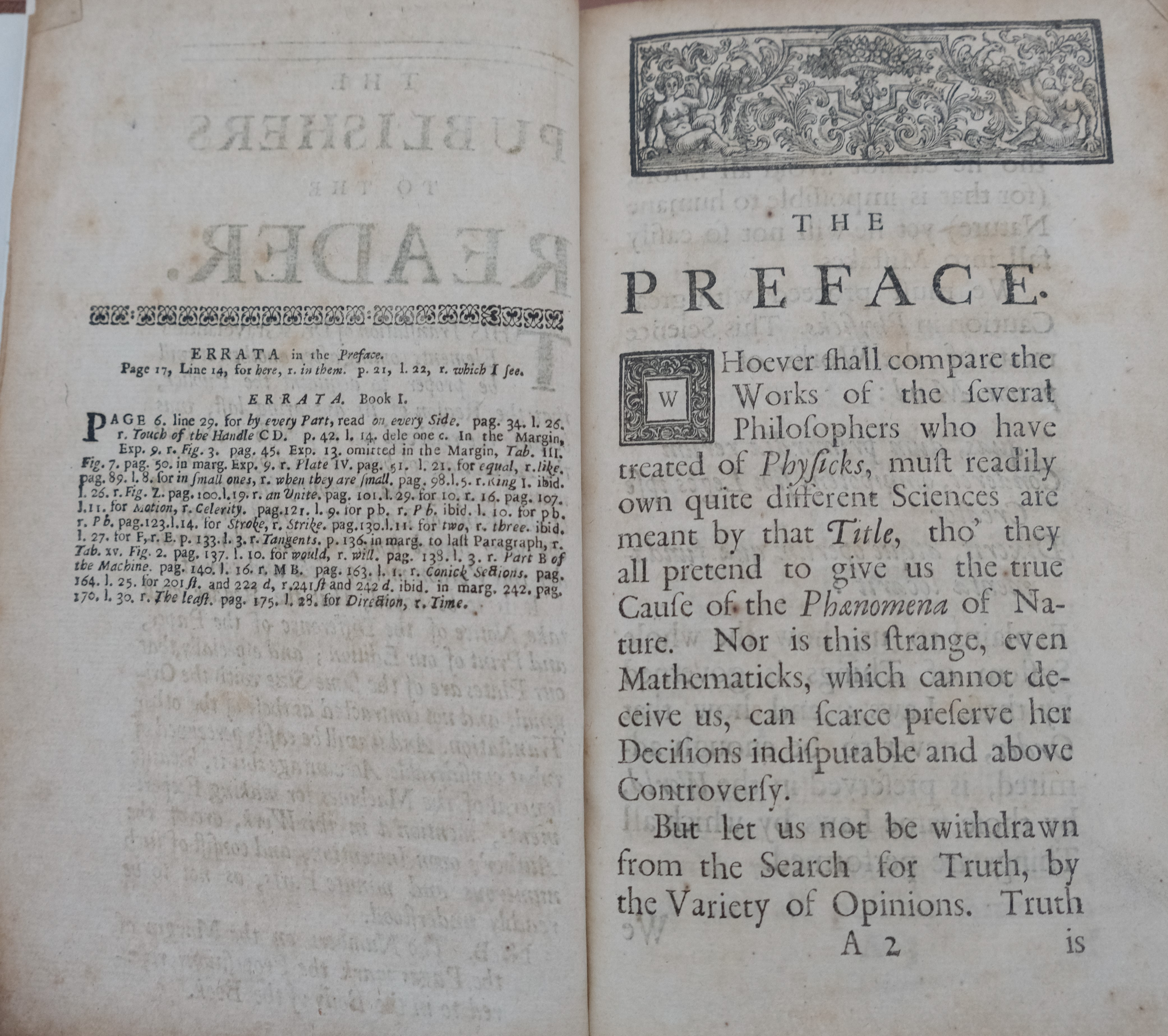
Preface to "Mathematical Elements of Physicks, Prov’d by Experiments"

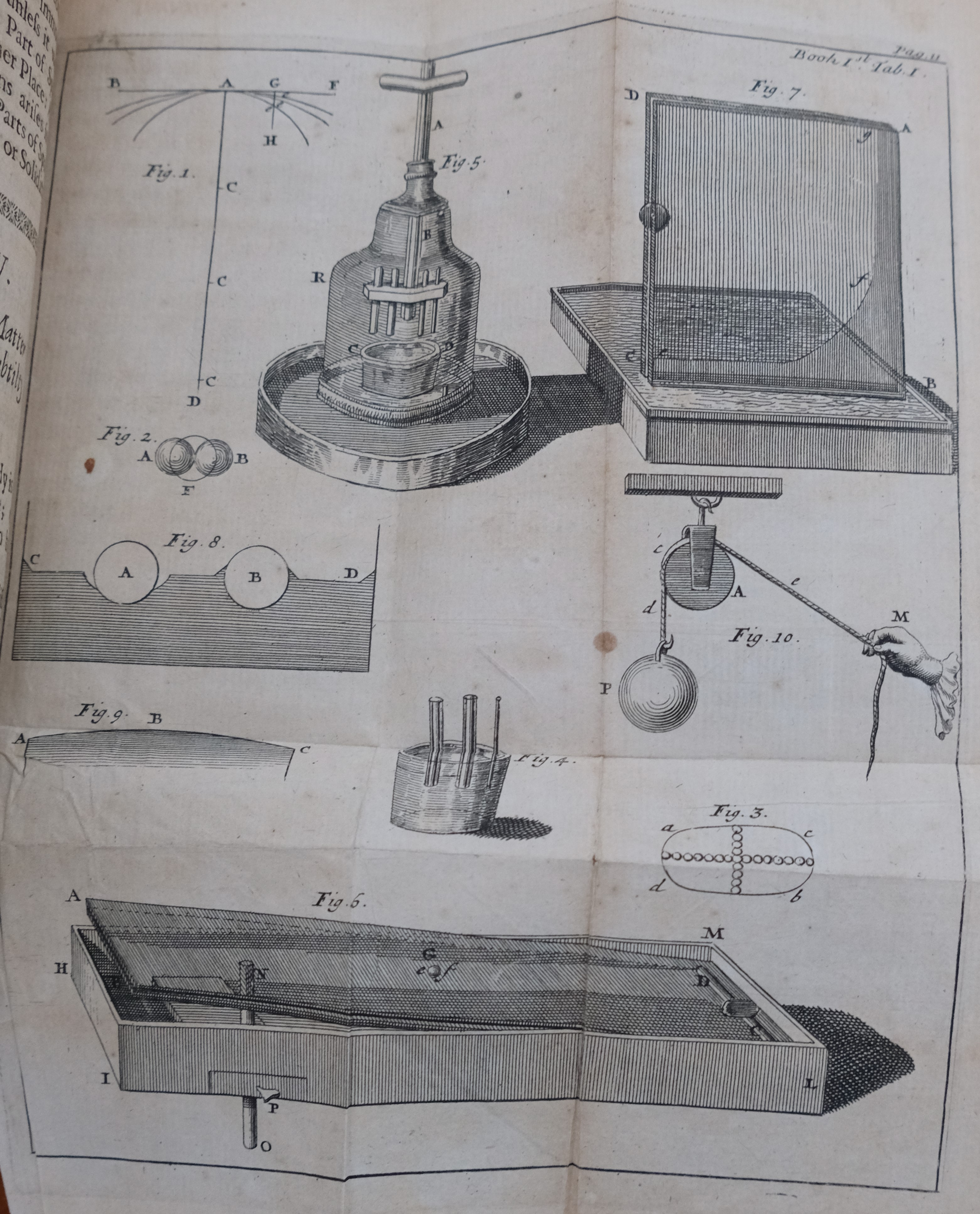
Table from "Mathematical Elements of Physicks, Prov’d by Experiments"

== See also ==
- 9682 Gravesande, main-belt asteroid named after Willem Jacob Gravesande
