= Leyden jar =

Antique electrical device that stores a high-voltage electric charge

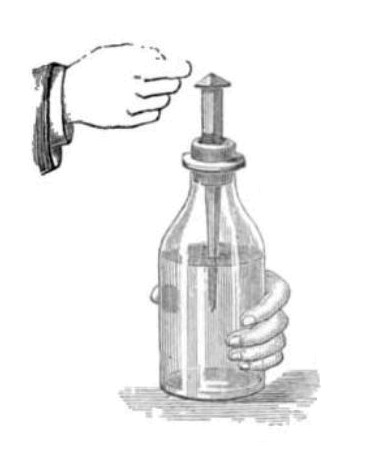
Early water-filled Leyden jar, consisting of a bottle with a metal spike through its stopper to make contact with the water

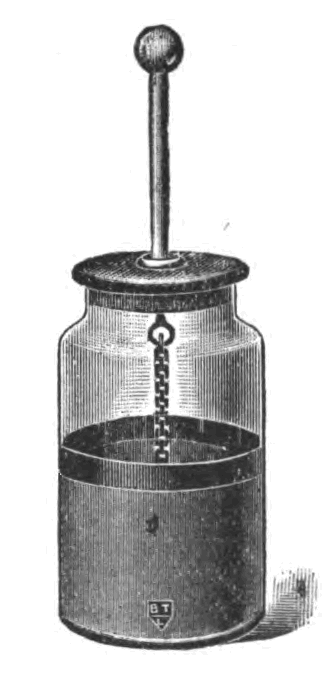
Later, more common type using metal foil, 1919

A Leyden jar (or Leiden jar, or archaically, Kleistian jar) is an electrical component that stores a high-voltage electric charge (from an external source) between electrical conductors on the inside and outside of a glass jar. It typically comprises a glass jar with metal foil cemented to the inside and the outside surfaces, and a metal terminal projecting vertically through the jar lid to make contact with the inner foil. It was the original form of the capacitor (also called a condenser).

Its invention was a discovery made independently by German cleric Ewald Georg von Kleist on 11 October 1745 and by Dutch scientist Pieter van Musschenbroek of Leiden (Leyden), Netherlands, in 1745–1746.

The Leyden jar was used to conduct many early experiments in electricity, and its discovery was of fundamental importance in the study of electrostatics. It was the first means of accumulating and preserving electric charge in large quantities that could be discharged at the experimenter's will, thus overcoming a significant limit to early research into electrical conduction. Leyden jars are still used in education to demonstrate the principles of electrostatics.

== Previous work ==
The ancient Greeks knew that pieces of amber could attract lightweight particles after being rubbed. The amber becomes electrified by the triboelectric effect, mechanical separation of charge in a dielectric material. The Greek word for amber is ἤλεκτρον (ēlektron) and is the origin of the word "electricity". Thales of Miletus, a pre-Socratic philosopher, is thought to have accidentally commented on the phenomenon of electrostatic charging, due to his belief that even lifeless things have a soul in them, hence the popular analogy of the spark. Around 1650, Otto von Guericke built a crude electrostatic generator: a sulphur ball that rotated on a shaft. When Guericke held his hand against the ball and turned the shaft quickly, a static electric charge built up. This experiment inspired the development of several forms of "friction machines", which greatly helped in the study of electricity.

Georg Matthias Bose (22 September 1710 – 17 September 1761) was a famous electrical experimenter in the early days of the development of electrostatics. He is credited with being the first to develop a way of temporarily storing static charges by using an insulated conductor (called a prime conductor). His demonstrations and experiments raised the interests of the German scientific community and the public in the development of electrical research.

== Discovery ==
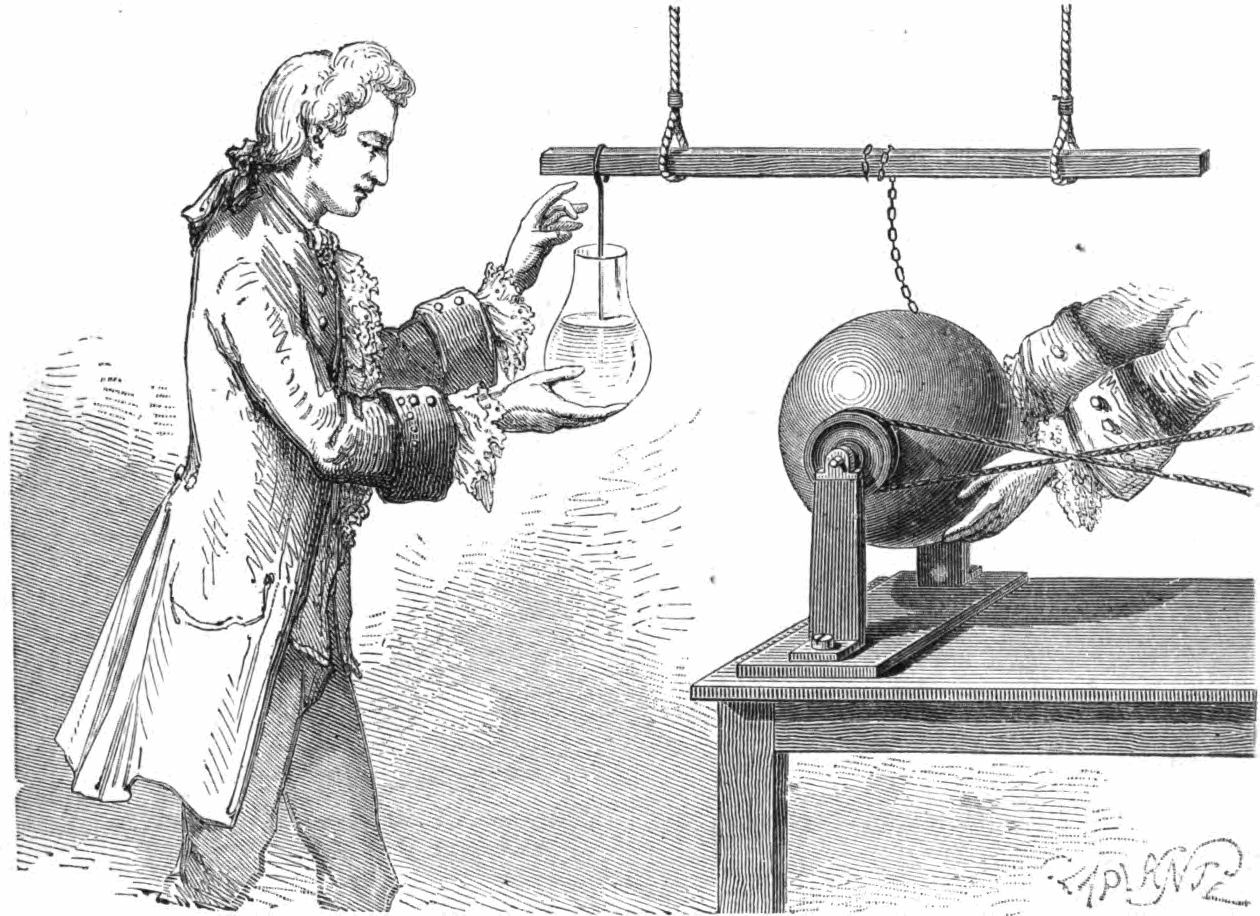
Discovery of the Leyden jar in van Musschenbroek's lab. The static electricity produced by the rotating glass sphere electrostatic generator was conducted by the chain through the suspended bar to the water in the glass held by Andreas Cunaeus. A large charge accumulated in the water and an opposite charge in Cunaeus's hand on the glass. When he touched the wire dipping in the water, he received a powerful shock

The Leyden jar was effectively discovered independently by two parties: German dean Ewald Georg von Kleist, who made the first discovery, and Dutch scientists Pieter van Musschenbroek and Andreas Cunaeus, who figured out why it only worked when held in the hand.

=== Von Kleist ===
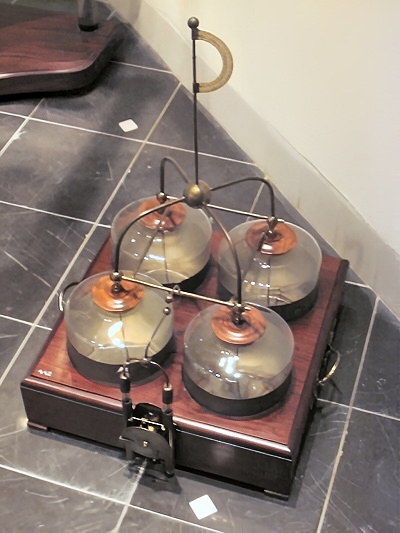
A "battery" of four water-filled Leyden jars, Museum Boerhaave, Leiden

Ewald Georg von Kleist was the dean at the cathedral of Cammin in Pomerania, a region now divided between Germany and Poland. Von Kleist is credited with first using the fluid analogy for electricity and demonstrated this to Bose by drawing sparks from water with his finger. He discovered the immense storage capability of the Leyden jar while attempting to demonstrate that a glass jar filled with alcohol would "capture" this fluid.

In October 1745, von Kleist tried to accumulate electricity in a small medicine bottle filled with alcohol with a nail inserted in the cork. He was following up on an experiment developed by Georg Matthias Bose where electricity had been sent through water to set alcoholic spirits alight. He attempted to charge the bottle from a large prime conductor (invented by Bose) suspended above his friction machine.

Von Kleist knew that the glass would provide an obstacle to the escape of the "fluid" and so was convinced that a substantial electric charge could be collected and held within it. He received a significant shock from the device when he accidentally touched the nail through the cork while still cradling the bottle in his other hand. He communicated his results to at least five different electrical experimenters, in several letters from November 1745 to March 1746, but did not receive any confirmation that they had repeated his results, until April 1746. Polish-Lithuanian physicist Daniel Gralath learned about von Kleist's experiment from seeing von Kleist's letter to Paul Swietlicki, written in November 1745. After Gralath's failed first attempt to reproduce the experiment in December 1745, he wrote to von Kleist for more information (and was told that the experiment would work better if the tube half-filled with alcohol was used). Gralath (in collaboration with Gottfried Reyger) succeeded in getting the intended effect on 5 March 1746, holding a small glass medicine bottle with a nail inside in one hand, moving it close to an electrostatic generator, and then moving the other hand close to the nail. Von Kleist didn't understand the significance of his conducting hand holding the bottle—and both he and his correspondents were loath to hold the device when told that the shock could throw them across the room. It took some time before von Kleist's student associates at Leyden worked out that the hand provided an essential element.

=== Musschenbroek and Cunaeus ===
The Leyden jar's invention was long credited to Pieter van Musschenbroek, the physics professor at Leiden University, who also ran a family foundry which cast brass cannonettes, and a small business (De Oosterse Lamp – "The Eastern Lamp") which made scientific and medical instruments for the new university courses in physics and for scientific gentlemen keen to establish their own 'cabinets' of curiosities and instruments.

Like von Kleist, Musschenbroek was also interested in, and attempting to repeat, Bose's experiment. During this time, Andreas Cunaeus, a lawyer, learned about this experiment from Musschenbroek, and attempted to duplicate the experiment at home with household items. Unaware of the "Rule of Dufay", that the experimental apparatus should be insulated, Cunaeus held his jar in his hand while charging it, and was thus the first to discover that such an experimental setup could deliver a severe shock. He reported his procedure and experience to Swiss-Dutch natural philosopher Jean-Nicolas-Sebastian Allamand, Musschenbroek's colleague. Allamand and Musschenbroek also received severe shocks. Musschenbroek communicated the experiment in a letter from 20 January 1746 to French entomologist René Antoine Ferchault de Réaumur, who was Musschenbroek's appointed correspondent at the Paris Academy. Abbé Jean-Antoine Nollet read this report, confirmed the experiment, and then read Musschenbroek's letter in a public meeting of the Paris Academy in April 1746 (translating from Latin to French).

Musschenbroek's outlet in France for the sale of his company's 'cabinet' devices was the Abbé Nollet (who started building and selling duplicate instruments in 1735). Nollet then gave the electrical storage device the name "Leyden jar" and promoted it as a special type of flask to his market of wealthy men with scientific curiosity. The "Kleistian jar" was therefore promoted as the Leyden jar, and as having been discovered by Pieter van Musschenbroek and his acquaintance Andreas Cunaeus. Musschenbroek, however, never claimed that he had invented it, and some think that Cunaeus was mentioned only to diminish credit to him.

== Further developments ==
Within months after Musschenbroek's report about how to reliably create a Leyden jar, other electrical researchers were making and experimenting with their own Leyden jars. One of his expressed original interests was to see if the total possible charge could be increased.

Johann Heinrich Winckler, whose first experience with a single Leyden jar was reported in a letter to the Royal Society on 29 May 1746, had connected three Leyden jars together in a kind of electrostatic battery on 28 July 1746. In 1746, Abbé Nollet performed two experiments for the edification of King Louis XV of France, in the first of which he discharged a Leyden jar through 180 royal guardsmen, and in the second through a larger number of Carthusian monks, all of whom sprang into the air more or less simultaneously. The opinions of neither the king nor the experimental subjects have been recorded.

Daniel Gralath reported in 1747 that in 1746 he had conducted experiments with connecting two or three jars, probably in series.

In 1746–1748, Benjamin Franklin experimented with charging Leyden jars in series, and developed a system involving 11 panes of glass with thin lead plates glued on each side, and then connected together. He used the term "electrical battery" to describe his electrostatic battery in a 1749 letter about his electrical research in 1748. It is possible that Franklin's choice of the word battery was inspired by the humorous wordplay at the conclusion of his letter, where he wrote, among other things, about a salute to electrical researchers from a battery of guns. This is the first recorded use of the term electrical battery. The multiple and rapid developments for connecting Leyden jars during the period 1746–1748 resulted in a variety of divergent accounts in secondary literature about who made the first "battery" by connecting Leyden jars, whether they were in series or parallel, and who first used the term "battery". The term was later used for combinations of multiple electrochemical cells, the modern meaning of the term "battery".

The Swedish physicist, chemist, and meteorologist Torbern Bergman translated much of Benjamin Franklin's writings on electricity into German and continued to study electrostatic properties.

Starting in late 1756, Franz Aepinus, in a complicated combination of independent work and collaboration with Johan Wilcke, developed an "air condenser", a variation on the Leyden jar, by using air rather than glass as the dielectric. This functioning apparatus, without glass, created a problem for Benjamin Franklin's explanation of the Leyden jar, which maintained that the charge was located in the glass.

== Design ==
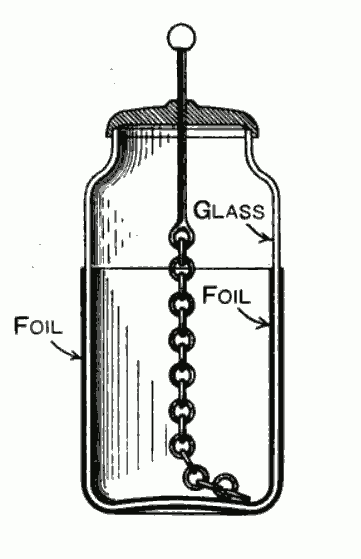
Leyden jar construction

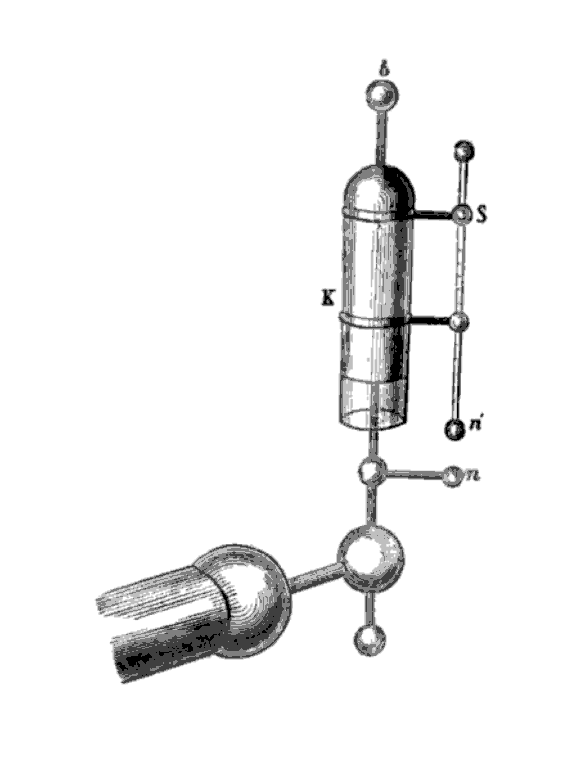
Measuring Leyden jar

A typical design consists of a glass jar with conducting tin foil coating the inner and outer surfaces. The foil coatings stop short of the mouth of the jar, to prevent the charge from arcing between the foils. A metal rod electrode projects through the nonconductive stopper at the mouth of the jar, electrically connected by some means (usually a hanging chain) to the inner foil, to allow it to be charged. The jar is charged by an electrostatic generator, or other source of electric charge, connected to the inner electrode while the outer foil is grounded. The inner and outer surfaces of the jar store equal but opposite charges.

The original form of the device is just a glass bottle partially filled with water, with a metal wire passing through a cork closing it. The role of the outer plate is provided by the hand of the experimenter. Soon John Bevis found (in 1747) that it was possible to coat the exterior of the jar with metal foil, and he also found that he could achieve the same effect by using a plate of glass with metal foil on both sides. These developments inspired William Watson in the same year to have a jar made with a metal foil lining both inside and outside, dropping the use of water.

Early experimenters (such as Benjamin Wilson in 1746) reported that the thinner the dielectric and the greater the surface, the greater the charge that could be accumulated.

Further developments in electrostatics revealed that the dielectric material was not essential, but increased the storage capability (capacitance) and prevented arcing between the plates. Two plates separated by a small distance also act as a capacitor, even in a vacuum.

== Storage of the charge ==
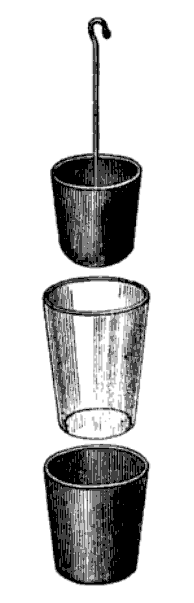
"Dissectible" Leyden jar, 1876

It was initially believed that the charge was stored in the water in early Leyden jars. In the 1700s American statesman and scientist Benjamin Franklin performed extensive investigations of both water-filled and foil Leyden jars, which led him to conclude that the charge was stored in the glass, not in the water. A popular experiment, due to Franklin, which seems to demonstrate this involves taking a jar apart after it has been charged and showing that little charge can be found on the metal plates, and therefore it must be in the dielectric. The first documented instance of this demonstration is in a 1749 letter by Franklin. Franklin designed a "dissectible" Leyden jar (right), which was widely used in demonstrations. The jar is constructed out of a glass cup nested between two fairly snugly fitting metal cups. When the jar is charged with a high voltage and carefully dismantled, it is discovered that all the parts may be freely handled without discharging the jar. If the pieces are re-assembled, a large spark may still be obtained from it.

This demonstration appears to suggest that capacitors store their charge inside their dielectric. This theory was taught throughout the 1800s. However, this phenomenon is a special effect caused by the high voltage on the Leyden jar. In the dissectible Leyden jar, charge is transferred to the surface of the glass cup by corona discharge when the jar is disassembled; this is the source of the residual charge after the jar is reassembled. Handling the cup while disassembled does not provide enough contact to remove all the surface charge. Soda glass is hygroscopic and forms a partially conductive coating on its surface, which holds the charge. Addenbrooke (1922) found that in a dissectible jar made of paraffin wax, or glass baked to remove moisture, the charge remained on the metal plates. Zeleny (1944) confirmed these results and observed the corona charge transfer.

If a charged Leyden jar is discharged by shorting the inner and outer coatings and left to sit for a few minutes, the jar will recover some of its previous charge, and a second spark can be obtained from it. Often this can be repeated, and a series of 4 or 5 sparks, decreasing in length, can be obtained at intervals. This effect is caused by dielectric absorption.

== Capacitance ==
The Leyden jar is a high-voltage device; it is estimated that at a maximum the early Leyden jars could be charged to 20000 to 60000 volts. The center rod electrode has a metal ball on the end to prevent leakage of the charge into the air by corona discharge. It was first used in electrostatics experiments, and later in high-voltage equipment such as spark-gap radio transmitters and electrotherapy machines.

Originally, the amount of capacitance was measured in number of 'jars' of a given size, or through the total coated area, assuming reasonably standard thickness and composition of the glass. A typical Leyden jar of one pint size has a capacitance of about 1 nanofarads (nF).

== Uses ==
Beginning in the late 18th century it was used in the medical field of electrotherapy to treat a variety of diseases by electric shock. By the middle of the 19th century, the Leyden jar had become common enough for writers to assume their readers knew of and understood its basic operation. Around the turn of the century it began to be widely used in spark-gap transmitters and medical electrotherapy equipment.

The development of the new technology of radio in the early 20th century encouraged the reduction in the size of Leyden jars as well as the reduction of undesired inductance and resistance. These improvements along with improved dielectrics caused the Leyden jar to evolve into the modern compact form of capacitor.

== See also ==
- Franklin bells
- Van de Graaff generator
- LeydenJar Technologies
