= Jar (unit) =

- Unit of: Capacitance

A jar was an early unit of capacitance once used by the British Royal Navy. The term originated as the capacitance of a Leyden jar. Its value is such that one farad is 9×10^{8} jars and one jar is 1111 picofarads.

== History ==
With early spark-gap transmitters, changing the transmission frequency was most easily accomplished by changing the number of Leyden jars connected to the tank circuit. While it was possible to calculate the required capacitance directly, it was more usual to simply have a book of lookup tables which gave the number of jars needed for any likely wavelength.
