= HighTechXL =

HighTechXL is a deep-tech venture builder, located in Eindhoven, the Netherlands. HighTechXL was established in 2014-15 on the High Tech Campus Eindhoven. HighTechXL is supported by the Eindhoven Startup Alliance, a dedicated partnership including ASML, Philips, Ernst & Young, NTS, ABN Amro and several other stakeholders. For example, Peter Wennink (CEO of ASML) said in 2015: “In its turbulent early years, ASML experienced first-hand how important a support system is for a young company. Supporting HighTechXL is our way of giving back to the community. In addition, we have the experience that these young companies can contribute: startups are a great source of ideas. Strengthening the high-tech hardware ecosystem, finally, is in our interest because we rely on a network of innovative suppliers and technology partners to continue our technology leadership.”

The initial set-up of HighTechXL was to recruit and select startup teams that already have a promising technology with the potential to grow into a successful business, and support these teams with various resources. At a later stage, CERN, European Space Agency and other research institutes invited HighTechXL to build ventures from their high-tech inventions. HighTechXL thus adapted its approach so that it could also start with a new (typically patented) technology, to subsequently build a team and support this team in developing the venture. In a report by Perception Box, HighTechXL is ranked in the top five of startup accelerators worldwide. In 2022, the HighTechXL team also helped create a new venture capital fund focused on deep-tech ventures, called DeepTechXL.

== See also ==
- Deep tech
- Deep tech venture
- Business incubator
- Startup accelerator
- Y Combinator (company)
- Techstars
- 500 Startups
