= Aquaver =

Dutch cleantech company

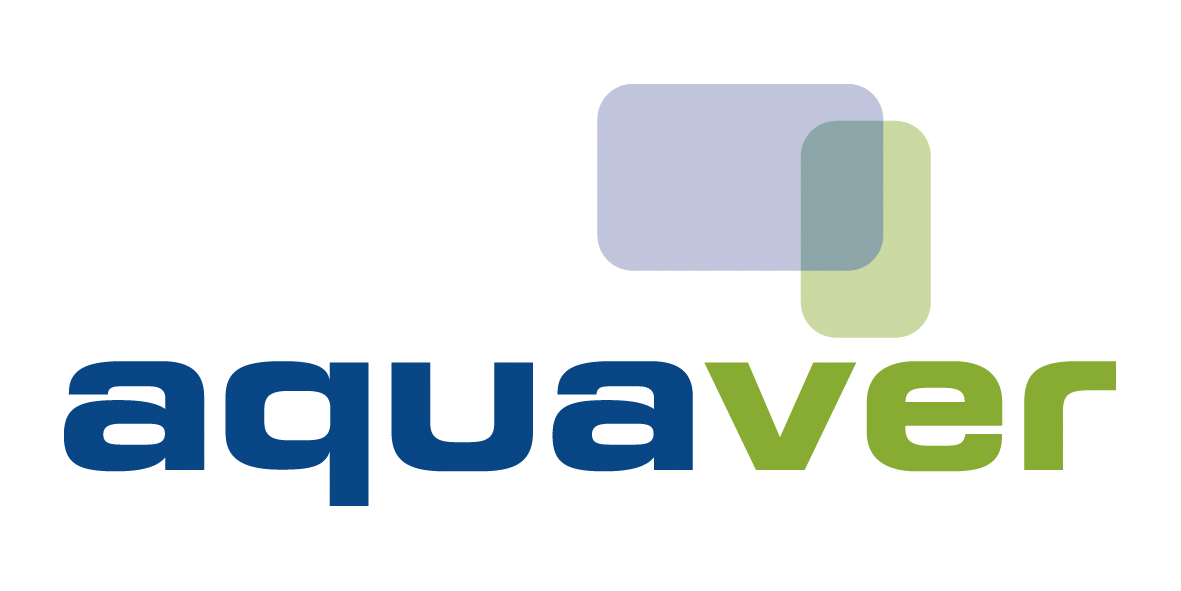
- Type: Private
- Industry: Renewables & Environment
- Founded: 2011
- Headquarters: Voorburg, Netherlands
- Products: Water Treatment Systems
- Website: aquaver.com

Aquaver is a cleantech company headquartered in Voorburg, Netherlands, with offices at the High Tech Campus Eindhoven. Aquaver is acknowledged to be the first company worldwide to develop commercial systems based on membrane distillation, a novel technology for water treatment.

== Technology ==
The technology of the Aquaver systems is based on membrane distillation. Membrane distillation combines membrane separation and distillation, with hydrophobic membranes and differences in vapour pressure. The Vacuum Multi Effect Membrane Distillation (VMEMD) configuration used in Aquaver systems adds the advantages of low-temperature operation and multi-effects to the membrane distillation characteristics. Aquaver has collaborated with memsys and Philips to develop its water treatment systems.

== Applications ==
Aquaver membrane distillation units are focused at desalination, industrial water treatment, and 'difficult-to-treat' waters. In February 2014 Aquaver commissioned in Gulhi, Maldives, the world's first desalination plant based on membrane distillation. The desalination plant makes use of the waste-heat produced by the existing diesel generators, which provide electricity to the island, to power the water purification process.

Aquaver is also participating with Abengoa and Masdar in a 7.9 million dollar project to develop an innovative desalination pilot plant in Ghantoot city, in Abu Dhabi’s border with Dubai. The desalination plant will have a capacity of producing 1,000 m3/d of desalted water using a hybrid system consisting in reverse osmosis in combination with an innovative membrane distillation system, provided by Aquaver, to optimize the traditional reverse osmosis process.

== Awards ==
Aquaver has received the Water Innovator of the Year 2013 and the Frost & Sullivan 2014 European New Product Innovation Leadership Award for the development of its membrane distillation water treatment systems.

== Merge ==
In 2015 Aquaver merged with memsys, which provides the membrane distillation modules used in Aquaver systems. The Aquaver management team, who started the company and brought membrane distillation to the market, has left to start other new ventures.

== See also ==
- Desalination
- Membrane distillation
- Sewage treatment
- Water pollution
- List of waste-water treatment technologies
- Industrial wastewater treatment
