= Pieter van Musschenbroek =

Dutch scientist and professor (1692–1761)

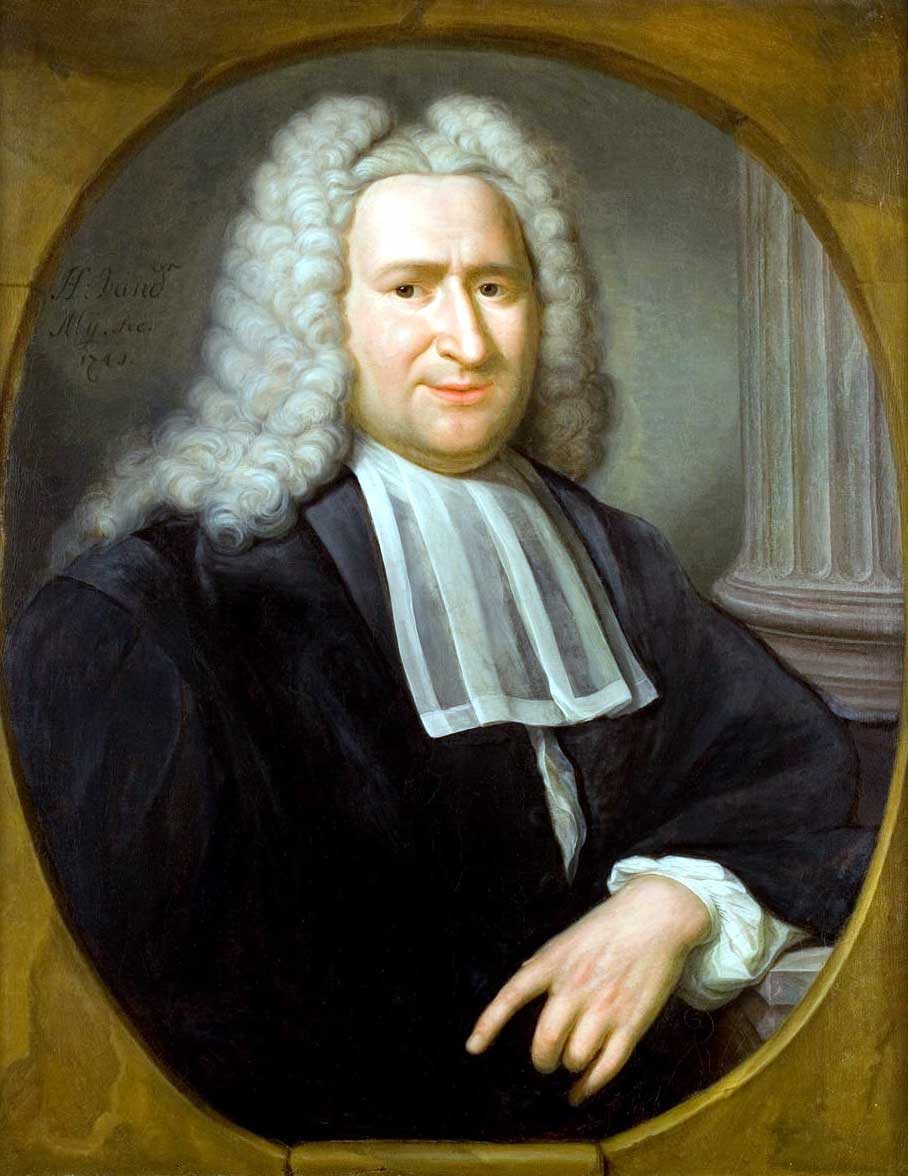
- 1741 portrait of Pieter van Musschenbroek
- Born: 14 March 1692; Leiden, Dutch Republic
- Died: 19 September 1761 (aged 69); Leiden, Dutch Republic
- Education: Leiden University
- Known for: Leyden jar, tribometer, atmometer
- Scientific career
- Fields: Physics, mathematics, philosophy, medicine, astronomy
- Doctoral advisor: Wolferd Senguerd; Herman Boerhaave
- Notable students: Andreas Cunaeus

Pieter van Musschenbroek (14 March 1692 – 19 September 1761) was a Dutch scientist credited with the invention of a pioneering capacitor design in the Leyden jar in 1746. He was a professor in Duisburg, Utrecht, and Leiden, specializing in physics, mathematics, philosophy, medicine, and astronomy. His pioneering work on the buckling of compressed struts made him one of the first scientists to provide detailed descriptions of testing machines for tension, compression, and flexure testing in 1729. An early example of a problem in dynamic plasticity was described in his 1739 paper (in the form of the penetration of butter by a wooden stick subjected to impact by a wooden sphere).

== Early life and studies ==
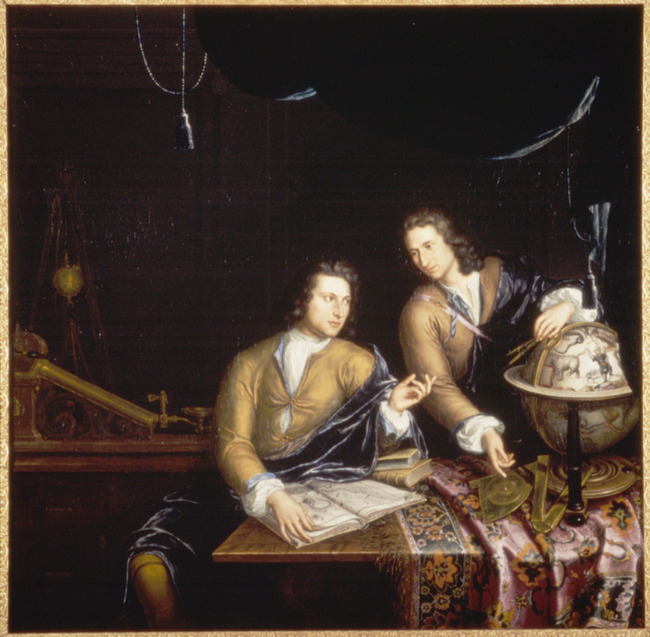
Portrait of the brothers Jan and Pieter van Musschenbroek, 1715, by Hieronymus van der Mij

Pieter van Musschenbroek was born on 14 March 1692 in Leiden, Holland, Dutch Republic. His father was Johannes van Musschenbroek and his mother was Margaretha van Straaten. The Van Musschenbroeks, originally from Flanders, had lived in the city of Leiden since circa 1600. His father was an instrument maker, who made scientific instruments such as air pumps, microscopes, and telescopes.

Van Musschenbroek attended Latin school until 1708, where he studied Greek, Latin, French, English, High German, Italian, and Spanish. He studied medicine at Leiden University and received his doctorate in 1715. He also attended lectures by John Theophilus Desaguliers and Isaac Newton in London. He finished his study in philosophy in 1719.

Van Musschenbroek belonged to the tradition of Dutch thinkers who popularised the ontological argument of God's design. He is author of Oratio de sapientia divina (Prayer of Divine Wisdom. 1744).

== Academic career ==
=== Duisburg ===
In 1719, van Musschenbroek became a professor of mathematics and philosophy at the University of Duisburg. In 1721, he also became professor of medicine.

=== Utrecht ===
In 1723, van Musschenbroek his posts in Duisburg and became professor at the University of Utrecht. In 1726 he also became professor in astronomy. Musschenbroek's Elementa Physica (1726) played an important part in the transmission of Isaac Newton's ideas in physics to Europe. In November 1734 he was elected a Fellow of the Royal Society.

=== Leiden ===
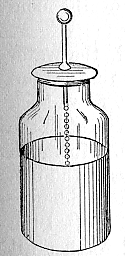
An early 20th-century illustration of a Leyden jar.

In 1739, van Musschenbroek returned to Leiden, where he succeeded Jacobus Wittichius as professor.

Already during his studies at Leiden University, Van Musschenbroek became interested in electrostatics. At that time, transient electrical energy could be generated by friction machines but there was no way to store it. Musschenbroek and his student Andreas Cunaeus discovered that the energy could be stored, in work that also involved Jean-Nicolas-Sébastien Allamand as collaborator. The apparatus was a glass jar filled with water into which a brass rod had been placed; and the stored energy could be released only by completing an external circuit between the brass rod and another conductor, originally a hand, placed in contact with the outside of the jar. Van Musschenbroek communicated this discovery to René Réaumur in January 1746, and it was Abbé Nollet, the translator of Musschenbroek's letter from Latin, who named the invention the 'Leyden jar'.

Soon afterwards, it transpired that a German scientist, Ewald Georg von Kleist, had independently constructed a similar device in late 1745, shortly before Musschenbroek.

He made a significant contribution to the field of tribology.

In 1754, he became an honorary professor at the Imperial Academy of Science in Saint Petersburg. He was also elected a foreign member of the Royal Swedish Academy of Sciences in 1747.

Van Musschenbroek died on 19 September 1761 in Leiden and was buried in the Pieterskerk.

== Works ==
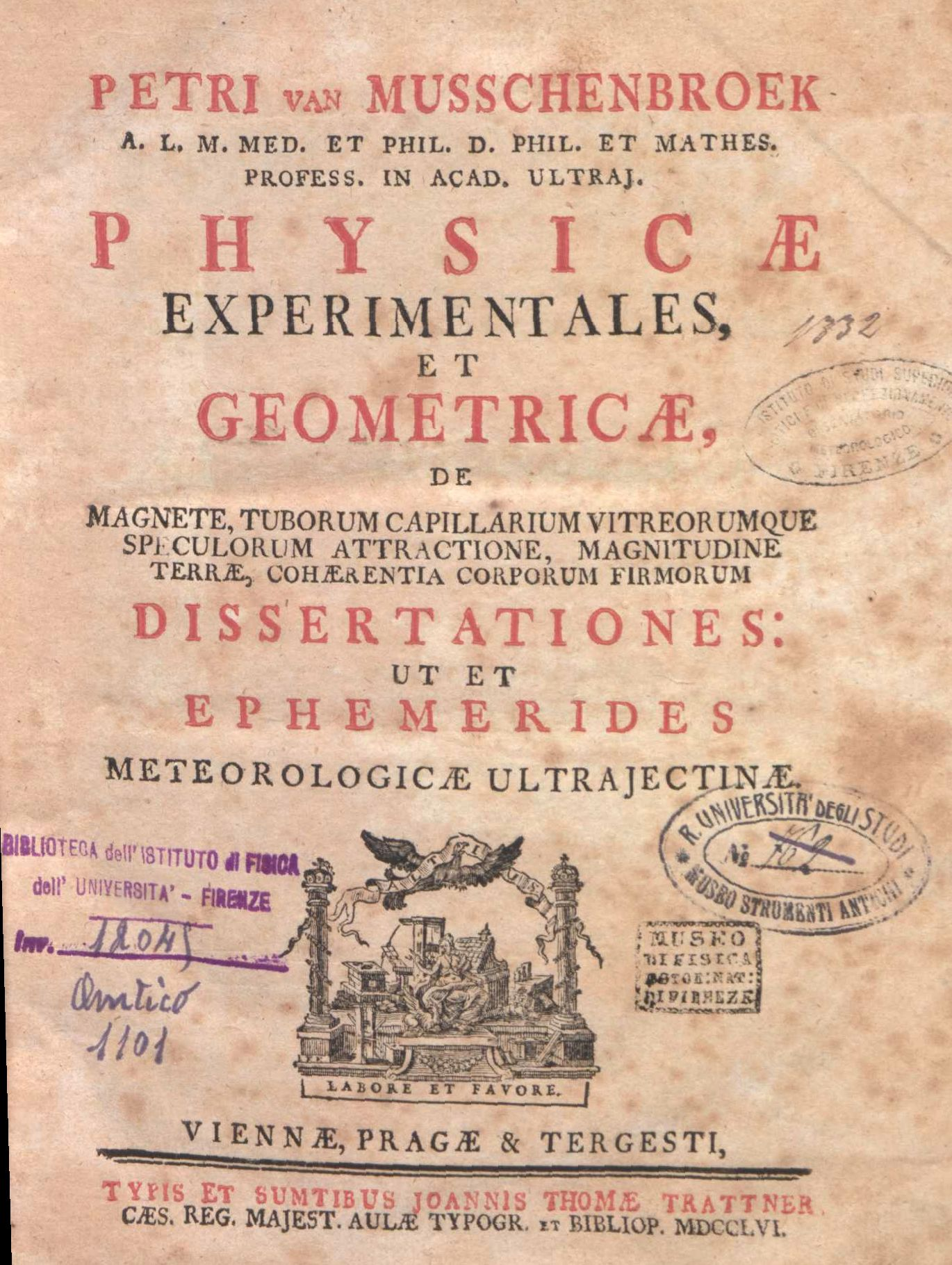
Physicae experimentales et geometricae dissertationes, 1755

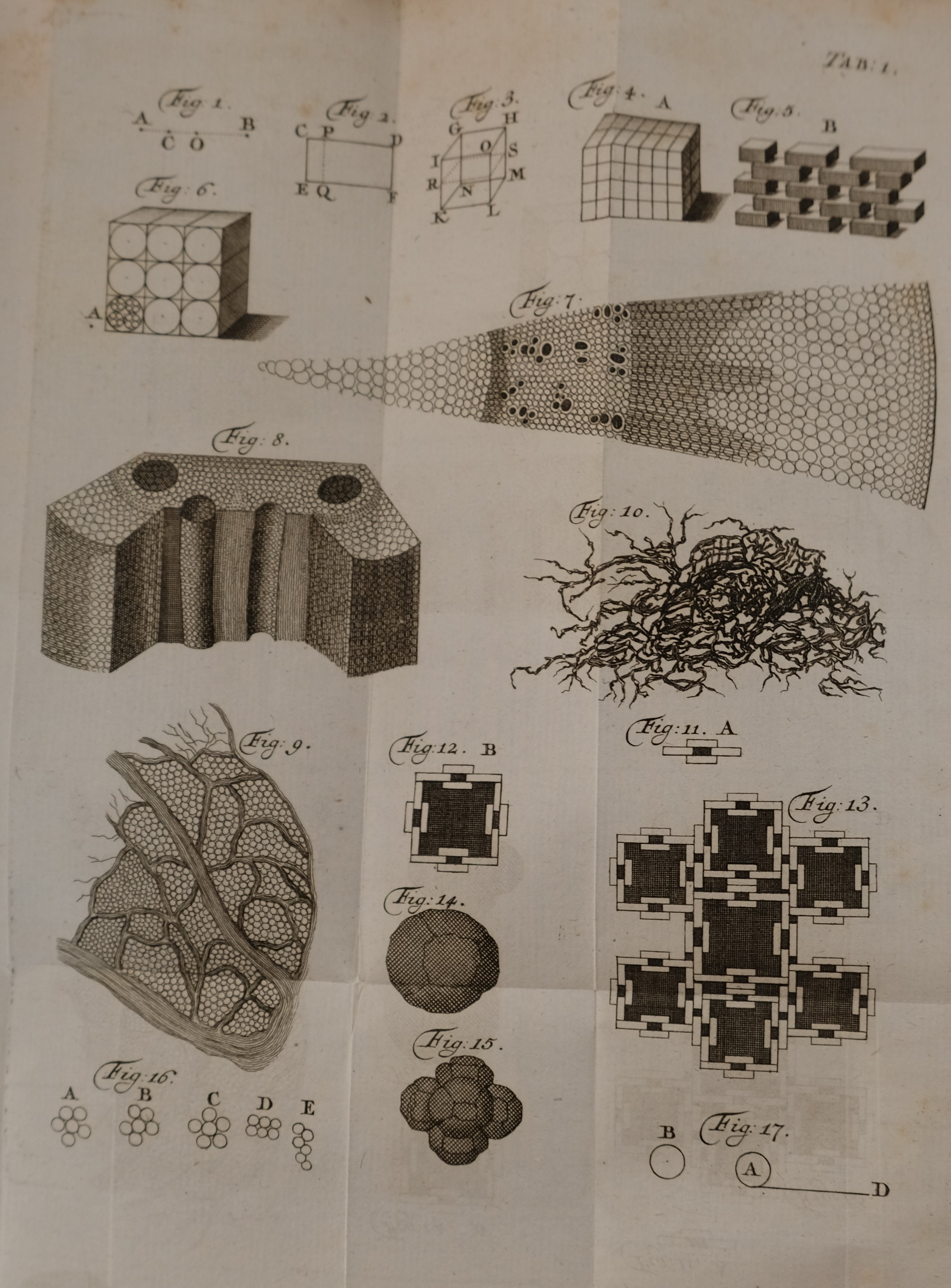
Figures in Institutiones physicae conscriptae in usus academicos (1748)

- Elementa Physica (1726)
- Dissertationes physicae experimentalis et geometricae de magnete (1729)
- Tentamina experimentorum naturalium in Accademia del Cimento (1731)
- Institutiones physicae (1734)
- Beginsels der Natuurkunde, Beschreeven ten dienste der Landgenooten, door Petrus van Musschenbroek, Waar by gevoegd is eene beschryving Der nieuwe en onlangs uitgevonden Luchtpompen, met haar gebruik tot veel proefnemingen (1736 / 1739)
- Aeris praestantia in humoribus corporis humani (1739)
- De fluido (in Latin). Leiden: Gerrit Potvliet. 1743.
- Oratio de sapientia divina (1744)
- Institutiones physicae conscriptae in usus academicos (in Latin). Lugduni Batavorum : Apud S. Luchtmans et filium, 1748.
- Dissertatio physica experimentalis de magnete (in Latin). Wien: Johann Thomas von Trattner (1.). 1754.
- Physicae experimentales et geometricae dissertationes (in Latin). Wien: Johann Thomas von Trattner (1.). 1755.
- Elementa physicae conscripta in usus academicos (in Latin). Venezia: Giovanni Battista Remondini. 1761.
- Institutiones logicae (1764)
- Elementa physicae conscripta in usus academicos (in Latin). Napoli: Giovanni Francesco Paci. 1771.
- Elementa physicae conscripta in usus academicos (in Latin). Bassano: Remondini. 1781.
- Introductio ad philosophiam naturalem (in Latin). Vol. 1. Padova: Tipografia del Seminario. 1824.
- Introductio ad philosophiam naturalem (in Latin). Vol. 2. Padova: Tipografia del Seminario. 1824.
