= Jean-Antoine Nollet =

French physicist (1700–1770)

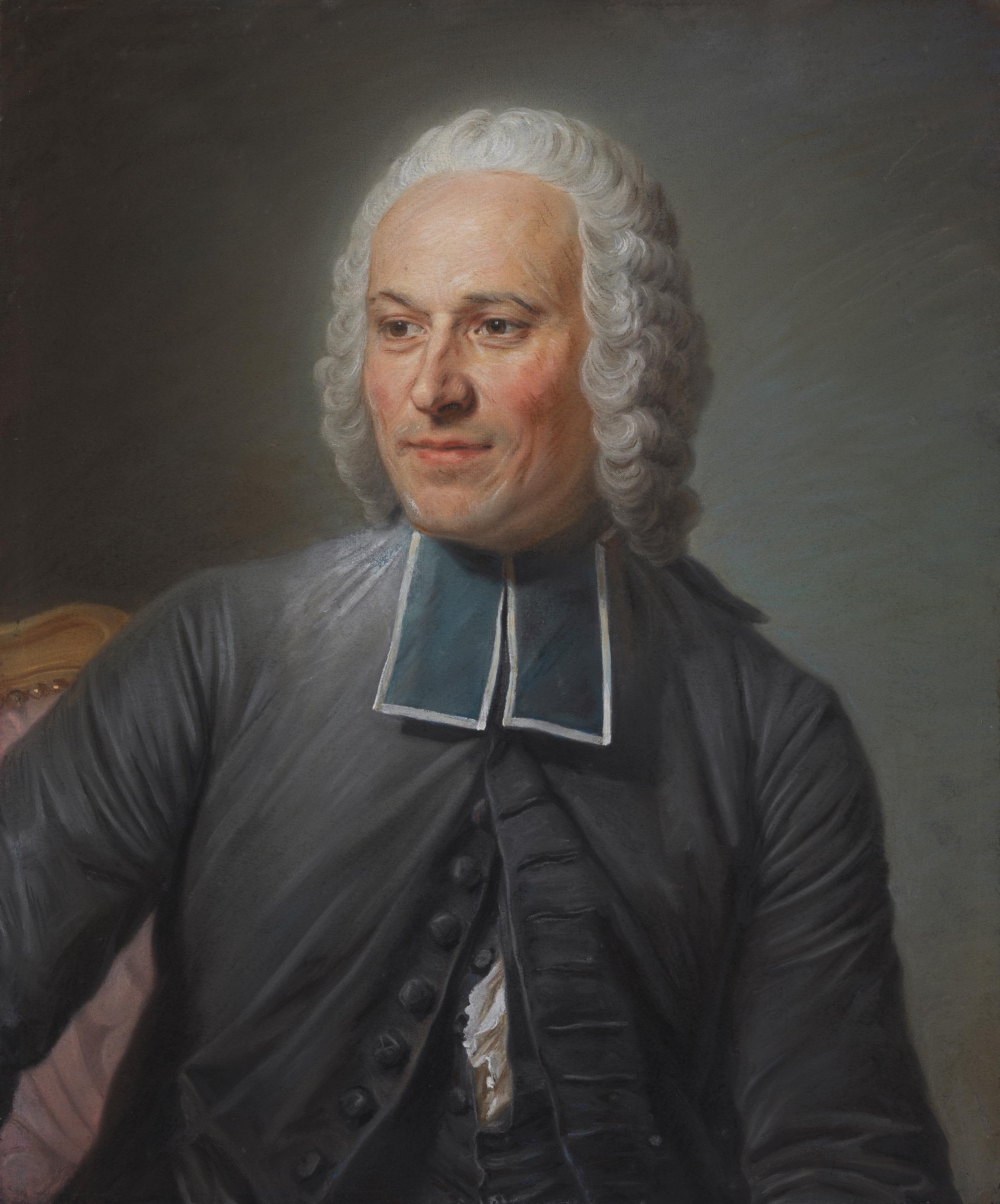
- Portrait by Quentin de La Tour, c. 1753
- Born: 19 November 1700; Pimprez, Kingdom of France
- Died: 25 April 1770 (aged 69); Paris, Kingdom of France
- Other name: Abbé Nollet
- Known for: Discovery of osmosis

Jean-Antoine Nollet (French: [ʒɑ̃ ɑ̃twan nole]; 19 November 1700 – 25 April 1770) was a French clergyman and physicist who conducted a number of experiments with electricity and discovered osmosis. As a deacon in the Catholic Church, he was also known as Abbé Nollet.

== Biography ==
Nollet studied humanities at the Collège de Clermont in Beauvais, starting in 1715. He completed a master's degree in the Faculty of Theology at the University of Paris in 1724. He was ordained a deacon in the Catholic Church in 1728, but suspended his clerical career. However he used the title of Abbé throughout his life. Nollet was particularly interested in the new science of electricity. He joined the Société des Arts in 1728, an association which was reestablished from a previous version which ended in 1723. Formed under the patronage of Comte de Clermont, the Société focused on applying natural philosophy to practical arts. This association gave Nollet the opportunity to come into contact with important natural philosophers. In particular, it is likely that he came into contact with Du Fay and Réaumur, two leading members of the Royal Academy of Sciences. Nollet assisted them with experiments in a wide variety of topics (e.g., anatomy of insects, fertilization of frogs, thermometry, pneumatics, phosphorescence, magnetism, and electricity) from about 1731 to 1735. In the period from 1731 to 1733, Nollet assisted Du Fay, especially with electrical experiments, and travelled with du Fay in 1734 to meet physicists in England and in 1736 to the Netherlands. He was a member of the Royal Society of London from 1734. He is reputed to have given the name to the Leyden jar after it was invented by Pieter van Musschenbroek. To finance his own experimental instruments, Nollet started building and selling duplicate instruments in 1735.

From at least 1743, the Royal Academy of Sciences identified Nollet as the person who was particularly in charge of research about electricity.

In 1753 he became the first professor of experimental physics in France, at the collège de Navarre, University of Paris. In 1762, he was named director of the Royal Academy of Sciences.

Nollet held lectures aimed to popularise physics with the use of instruments. These lectures, collected together and published as Leçons de physique expérimentale and L’Art des expériences, continued to inspire self-taught scientists through the 19th century.

== Scientific work ==
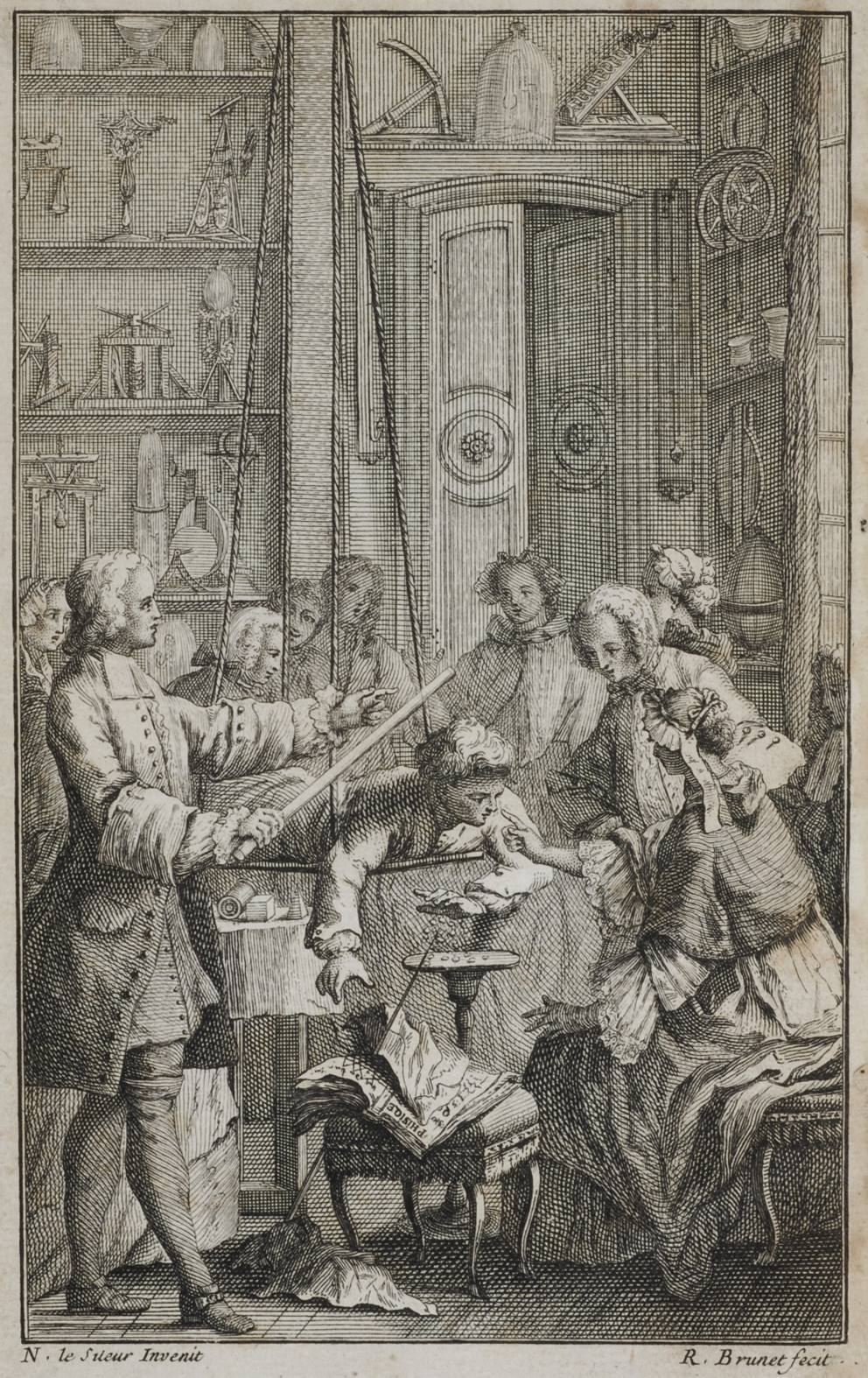
The Electric Boy, Essai sur l'electricité des corps, 1746

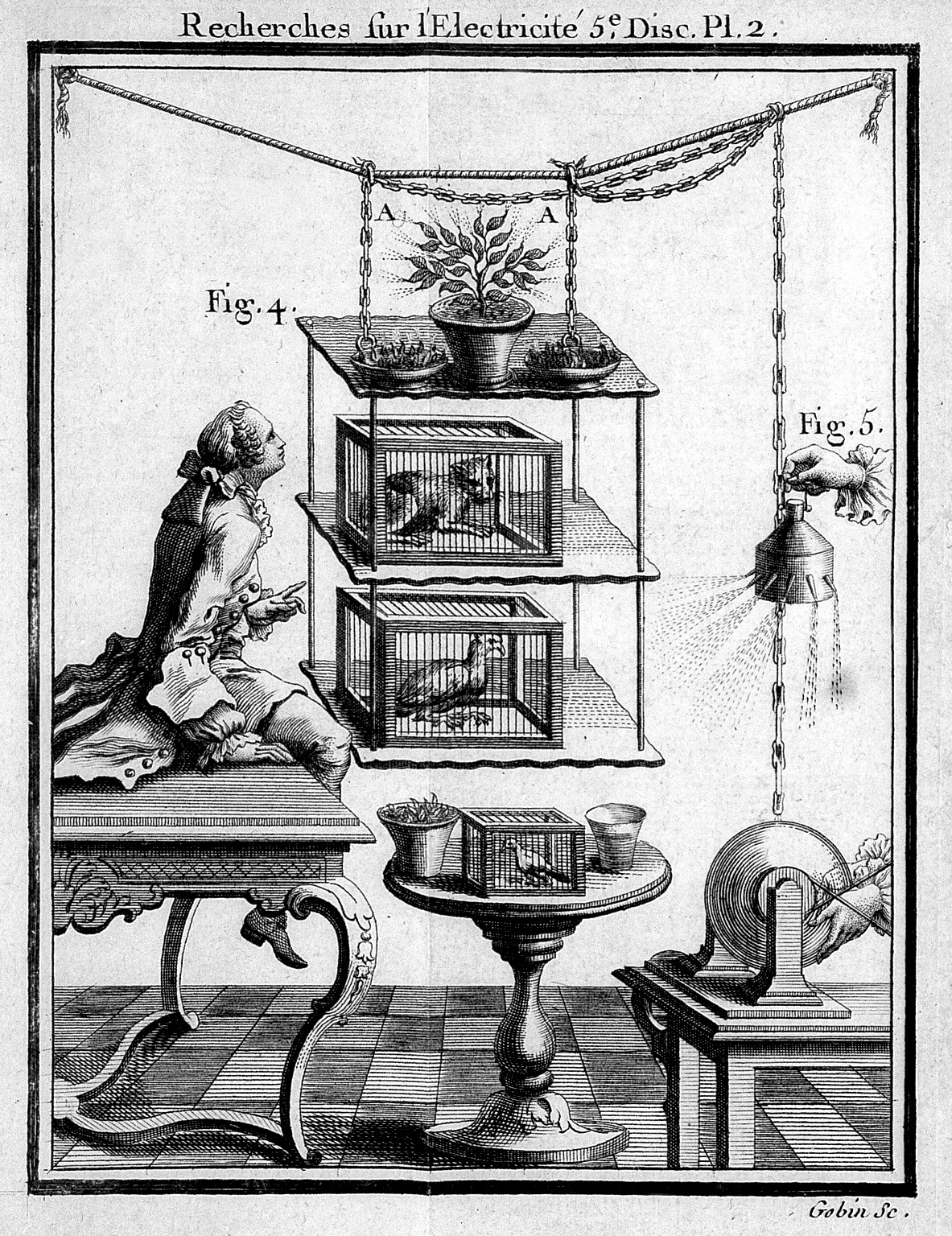
Effects of electricity on living organisms and electrospray, Recherches sur les causes particulières des phénomènes électriques, 1749 (Wellcome L0007028)

One of many experimental demonstrations of static electricity which he carried out was the "Electric boy", in which a young man was suspended from the ceiling using insulating silk cords, and electrified, causing his body to accumulate charge. Objects were attracted to him, and close proximity of another person could lead to sparks.

In 1746 Nollet gathered about two hundred monks into a circle about a mile (1.6 km) in circumference, with pieces of iron wire connecting them. He then discharged a battery of Leyden jars through the human chain and observed that each man reacted at substantially the same time to the electric shock, showing that the speed of electricity's propagation was very high.

In 1748 he discovered the phenomenon of osmosis in natural membranes. He covered with pig bladder the mouth of a flask of ethanol, then submerged it in water. After 5 or 6 hours, the pig bladder became convex, and when he pricked it, liquid shot out rising more than 1 foot in height.

In the same year, he also invented an electroscope.

In 1750 Nollet was the first to report a phenomenon that is known today as electrostatic spraying. He noted that water flowing from a vessel would aerosolize if the vessel was electrified and placed near electrical ground.

== Writings ==
- 1735: Cours de physique expérimentale Paris.
- 1743-1764: Leçons de physique expérimentale (6 vols.). Paris.
- 1745: "Conjectures sur les causes de l'Électricité des Corps". Mémoires de l'Académie Royale des Sciences de l'Année 1745 (in French). 1745. Paris: L'Imprimerie Royale: 107–152. 1749.
- 1746: Observations sur quelques nouveaux phénomènes d'Électricité" Mémoires de l'Académie Royale des Sciences de l'Année 1746, Paris, 1751, pp. 1-23. Partial English translation in: Magie, W.F. (1935). "The Leyden Jar." Source book in physics. Cambridge: Harvard University Press. pp. 403–406.

- Essai sur l'électricité des corps. Paris.(2nd ed.), 1750. (link to 3rd printing, 1765) Paris.

- 1747: Part of a Letter from Abbè Nollet, of the Royal Academy of Sciences at Paris, and F. R. S. to Martin Folkes Esq; Presisident of the Same, concerning Electricity (Translated from the French by Tho. Stack, M.D. F.R.S.). Philosophical Transactions, 45: 187–194, 1748.
- 1749: Recherches Sur Les Causes Particulieres Des Phénoménes Électriques. Paris.

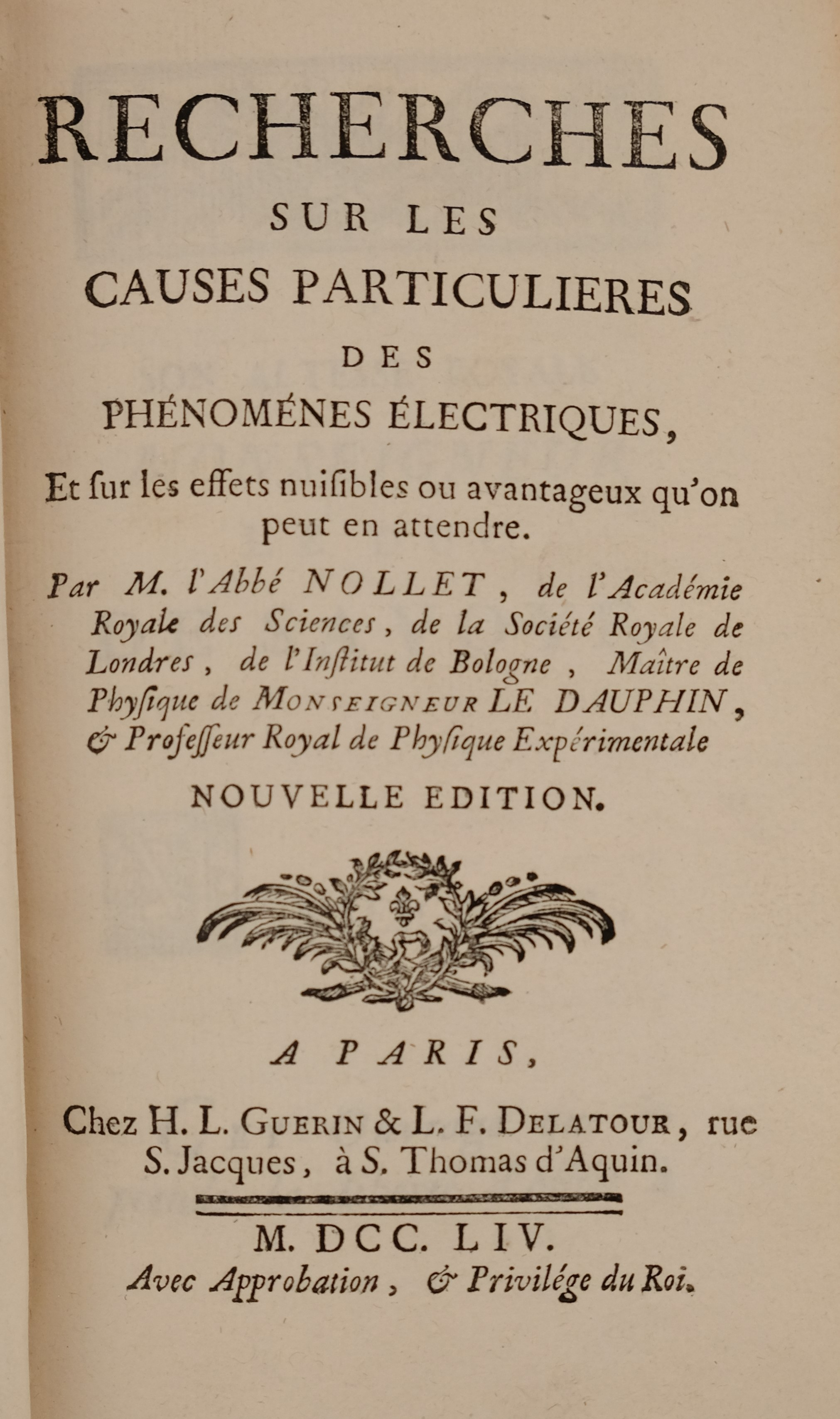
Recherches sur les causes particulieres des phénoménes électriques (1754)

Nouvelle Édition, 1754, Paris.

- 1750: Extract of the Observations Made in Italy, by the Abbe Nollet, F.R.S. on the Grotta de Cani (Translated from the French by Tho. Stack, M.D. F.R.S.). Philosophical Transactions, 47: 48–61, 1752.
- 1759: Leçons de physique expérimentale, Vol. 1 (5th ed.) Paris.
- 1760: Lettres sur l'electricite (Premiere Partie, Nouvelle Édition) Paris. (5 of the letters are to Benjamin Franklin)
- 1770: L'Art des expériences. (3 vols.) (1st and 2nd ed.; 1784, 3rd. ed.; 1787, Nouvelle edition) Paris.
- Art des expériences (in French). Vol. 1. Paris: Pierre Étienne Germain Durand. 1770.
- Art des expériences (in French). Vol. 3. Paris: Pierre Étienne Germain Durand. 1770.
- Turner, A.; Gauvin, J.F (2002). "Bibliography of Jean Antoine Nollet". In Pyenson, L.; Gauvin, J.F. (eds.). The Art of Teaching Physics: The Eighteenth-century Demonstration Apparatus of Jean Antoine Nollet. Septentrion. pp. 203–216. ISBN 9782894483206.

== See also ==
- List of Roman Catholic scientist-clerics
