= Jean-Nicolas-Sébastien Allamand =

Swiss-Dutch natural philosopher

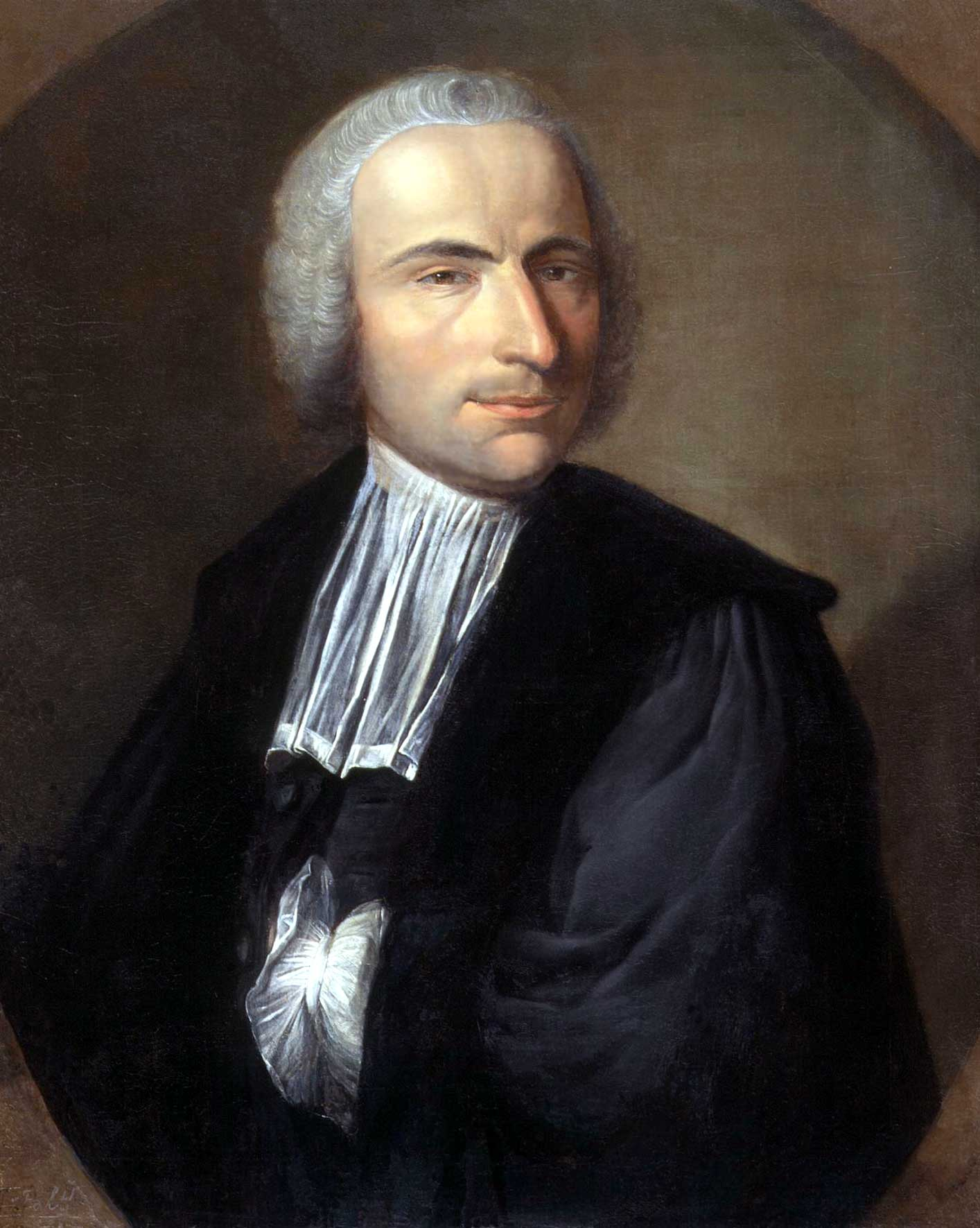
Allamand by Jan Palthe, 1751

Jean-Nicolas-Sébastien Allamand (Dutch: Johannes Nicolaas Sebastiaan Allamand, Latin: Johannes Nicolaus Sebastianus Allamand; born 18 October 1716, or, according to other sources, 18 September 1713 – died 2 March 1787) was a Swiss-born Dutch natural philosopher. He conducted early research on giraffes, using skin and bone samples sent in 1764 from South Africa.

== Life ==
He was born in Lausanne. At first he specialized in theology, and subsequently he came to the Netherlands, where he practised mathematics, physics, chemistry, and natural history, in Leiden. He met Willem 'sGravesande, who entrusted him with the education of his two sons and made him his executor. Allamand expanded his knowledge of physics, and with 'sGravesande's support, he became a professor of philosophy at the University of Franeker on 3 March 1747. Two years later, he was called back and became a professor of mathematics and philosophy at the University of Leiden. He accepted this position on 30 May with a reading of On the True Philosopher, which was mostly designed to praise his mentor.

As a practitioner of natural history, Allamand was important for the creation and expansion of a Cabinet of Natural History at the University. He also collected from his own funds a Cabinet of Natural Rarities, during his lifetime open to students in a hall behind the Academy building. He donated it to the University on his death on 2 March 1787. He was a benefactor of the Cabinet of Antiquities. He had no children with his wife, Margaretha Crommelin.

He sent skin and bone (ossicone) samples from giraffes to the samples the French naturalist, the Comte de Buffon in Paris, who studied them and later wrote about them in his Histoire Naturelle.

Allamand was elected a Fellow of the Royal Society in 1747.

== Works ==
He enriched the bird descriptions in the Dutch edition of Buffon's Histoire Naturelle with many additions and descriptions. Further, Allamand edited the writings of 'sGravensande, Oeuvres philosophiques et mathématiques (2 volumes, with 28 illustrations, Amsterdam 1774), and the Geschiedkundig Woordenboek of Prosper Marchand, which he edited.

He also translated from Latin: Brisson's Dierenrijk, Leiden 1762, to which he added many remarks. From French, he translated:

- Oliver's Verhandeling over de Kometen, 1777
- H. Hopp's new description of Cape Good Hope, 1778
- Reading of Jakob Forster concerning different subjects, Leiden, 1793.
- Herman Boerhaave's Elementen der scheikunde
- Ellis, Natuurlijke Historie van de Koraalgewassen en andere Zeeligchamen, Amsterdam, 1756

He wrote some essays on physics, and gave the first explanation of the Leyden jar.
