= Deep tech =

Classification of a startup company

Deep technology (deep tech (Note: Also stylized as DeepTech)) is a classification of organization, or more typically startup company, with the expressed objective of providing technology solutions based on substantial scientific or engineering challenges. They focus on challenges requiring lengthy research and development, and large capital investment before successful commercialization. Their primary risk is technical risk, while market risk is often significantly lower due to the clear potential value of the solution to society. The underlying scientific or engineering problems being solved by deep tech (and hard tech companies) generate valuable intellectual property which is hard to reproduce.

== Definition ==
The term "deep tech" has been present for decades, ranging from R&D divisions at major defense and telecommunications corporations such as Raytheon Technologies, Lockheed Martin's Skunk Works, and Bell Labs, to the more modern definition which increasingly includes companies found in the venture capital ecosystem or awardees of the Small Business Innovation Research (SBIR) program, a U.S. government program, coordinated by the Small Business Administration, that provides $2.5 billion annually to small, U.S.-owned companies that compete for funding to develop and commercialize disruptive technologies. Deep tech doesn't refer to innovation itself, but to a category of startup companies that develop new products based “on scientific discovery or meaningful engineering innovation”.

Hard Tech, which is sometimes used as a similar term to deep tech, refers to deep tech that mainly focuses on tangible products that require sophisticated engineering and manufacturing.

According to year 2019 research by the Boston Consulting Group and Hello Tomorrow, a French nonprofit that supports deep technology, the most prominent deep tech fields included advanced materials, advanced manufacturing, artificial intelligence, machine learning, biotechnology, blockchain, robotics, photonics, aerospace and space technology, electronics (including semiconductor manufacturing), cyber threat intelligence, fusion power and quantum computing. Global private investment in those fields increased by more than 20% a year from 2015, and reached almost $18 billion in 2018. Possible fields for deep tech application include agriculture, life sciences, chemistry, aerospace and green energy. In the business context, deep tech has three main attributes: potential for impact, a long time to reach market-ready maturity, and substantial requirement for capital.

- Deep tech innovations are often radical and may create new markets or disrupt existing ones. Deep tech companies often address big societal and environmental challenges and have potential to impact everyday life. Silicon chips are an example of innovation that enabled calculation at previously unimaginable speed and scale.
- The time required to move from basic science to applicable technology in deep tech exceeds the development time of startups based on widely available technology ("shallow tech" such as mobile apps, websites, and e-commerce services). For instance, the development of technology behind artificial intelligence took decades, and now AI companies are rapidly developing in many fields. According to Hello Tomorrow, as of 2019 it took an average of four years to bring a product to market in biotech and 2.4 years in blockchain.
- The demand for huge early-stage funding for R&D and prototype development, and the lengthy life cycle of deep tech startups force them to abandon the established funding progression from friends and family, to angel and seed money, series A and subsequent rounds leading to trade sale or IPO. Many companies are also funded by governments and other types of non-dilutive grants.

Some analysts, such as Faÿçal Hafied (2022), distinguish two possible approaches to defining deep tech: the material and the organic approach.

The material approach is based on the concept of the "technological frontier," defined as the limit, at a given point in time, of scientific and technological knowledge. Deep tech companies are thus those that mobilize technologies located on this frontier at a given moment. This approach makes it possible to identify technologies considered "deep" in light of the state of the art, but it also implies their possible obsolescence: as scientific and technological knowledge progresses, some technologies once described as "deep" mature and lose this qualification, being gradually supplanted by new breakthrough technologies.

The organic approach is based on the microeconomic concept of "market failure," which rests on the identification of barriers to entry. It posits that innovation is part of a long, costly process with uncertain returns, which tends to discourage private investment. So-called "breakthrough" technologies, which lie precisely at the level of the "technological frontier" in the sense of the material approach, face two main types of barriers to entry:

1. The high capital intensity of projects. This comes into play at two crucial stages. First, at the research stage, which takes place in an uncertain environment and is characterized by strong information asymmetry between innovators and financiers regarding possible outcomes, which lengthens project timelines and increases their cost. Second, at the stage of industrialization and scaling up, which entails additional investments in equipment and production infrastructure. It is during this phase, commonly referred to as the start-up "valley of death," that a high mortality rate is most often observed among deep tech start-ups.
2. Uncertainty about the future returns of projects. Innovation is not a linear process: it proceeds through iterations, intermediate failures, learning, and renewed attempts. This ongoing trial-and-error generates uncertainty and is accompanied by a high final failure rate for research projects. Moreover, breakthrough technologies may constitute advances of such magnitude that, by definition, no market yet exists to absorb them, which further compounds the uncertainty. The adoption costs of a technology may also be high for its users, regardless of the intrinsic merit of the scientific breakthrough.

The combination of these two barriers to entry produces a strong disincentive effect, which manifests itself primarily in a discouragement of private investment. This situation of "market failure" therefore justifies the mobilization of corrective mechanisms, such as public intervention and its various instruments (grants and public aid, tax incentives, public funding of research, etc.), as well as the intervention of specialized investors, notably venture capital actors (business angels, venture capital firms, corporate venture funds).

== History ==
The funding for deep tech companies has increased over the years. According to Boston Consulting Group, the total investments in deep tech companies increased from $1.7 billion to $7.9 billion from 2011 through 2016. Investment activities are concentrated in the United States and China that totaled for about 81% of global private investments in deep tech from 2015 through 2018 with approximately $32.8 billion and $14.6 billion invested in each country, respectively. China acts as the main driver in deep tech investments with funding increasing 80% each year over that period compared to 10% each year in the US. European countries are also active in deep tech investing. According to the Financial Times, in 2017 the total funding towards deep tech companies reached around €3 billion across 600 deals.

Corporations such as Google, Facebook, Amazon, IBM and Apple show increased interest towards deep tech applications in AI, virtual reality, drones, self-driving cars. Business accelerators are also shifting focus from digital startups towards deep tech ventures. In 2016 Y Combinator's batch there were 32 deep tech startups including 9 in biotech, 4 in drones and 3 in advanced hardware. The Eindhoven-based startup accelerator HighTechXL exclusively focuses on deep tech ventures. In Japan, the DTSSA (Deep Tech Startup Supporters Association) has also been actively supporting deep tech, helping to accelerate innovation and growth in the country’s deep tech ecosystem.

== See also ==
- Venture capital
- Intermediate technology – sometimes used to mean technology between low and high technology
- HighTechXL
