= Kleist =

Kleist, or von Kleist, is a surname.

von Kleist:

- August von Kleist (1818–1890), Prussian Major General
- Conrad von Kleist (1839-1900), German politician (German Conservative Party), member of Reichstag
- Ewald Georg von Kleist (ca. 1700–1748), also known as Ewald Jürgen von Kleist, co-inventor of the Leyden jar
- Frederick William von Kleist (1724–1767), Prussian major general, commander of the Green Hussars. One of 58 officers of the Kleist family to serve in the Seven Years' War
- Ewald Christian von Kleist (1715–1759), German poet and soldier
- Henning Alexander von Kleist (1677–1747) Prussian general
- Henning Alexander von Kleist (1707–1784). Prussian Lt. General. Nephew of Henning Alexander von Kleist (above)
- Franz Kasimir von Kleist (1738–1808) Prussian General
- Franz Alexander von Kleist (1769–1799) Poet
- Friedrich Graf Kleist von Nollendorf (1762–1823), Prussian field marshal
- Heinrich von Kleist (1777–1811), German writer
  - Kleist Prize, German literary prize named after Heinrich
- Paul Ludwig Ewald von Kleist (1881–1954), German field marshal
  - Panzer Group Kleist and Army Group von Kleist, parts of the German First Panzer Army
- Ewald von Kleist-Schmenzin (1890–1945), conspirator to assassinate Adolf Hitler
- Ewald-Heinrich von Kleist-Schmenzin (1922–2013), conspirator to assassinate Adolf Hitler

Kleist:

- Kleist Sykes, former Tanzanian mayor
- Henry Kleist, farmer and Socialist state senator from Rantoul, Wisconsin
- Kuupik Kleist, First Minister elect of Greenland
- Karl Kleist, German psychiatrist
- Makka Kleist (born 1951), Greenlandic actress
