= 3rd Cuirassier Regiment (France) =

Former French cavalry regiment

3^{e} Régiment de Cuirassiers
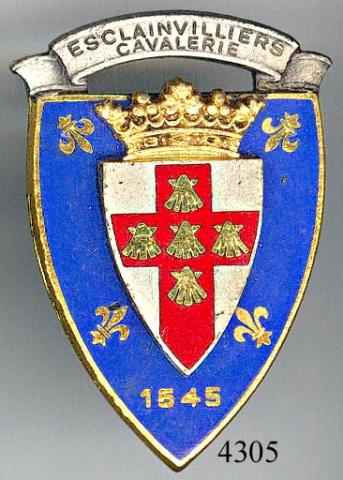
- Active: 1645 – 1815; 1816 – 1919; 1940; 1952 – 1964; 1968 – 1998
- Country: France
- Branch: French Army
- Type: Heavy Cavalry/Armored Cavalry
- Engagements: Thirty Years' War; Franco-Dutch War; Nine Years' War; War of the Spanish Succession; French Revolutionary Wars; Napoleonic Wars; World War I World War II: Battle of France; Algerian War
- Decorations: Croix de guerre 1914–1918 with a silver star

The 3rd Cuirassier Regiment (French: 3^{e} Régiment de Cuirassiers, 3^{e} RC) was a cavalry regiment of the French Army, later reequipped as an armored regiment.

== Ancien Régime ==
Timoléon de Sercourt d’Esclainvilliers inherited his father's company of Light Horse in 1635, when he was three years old. The same year in May, Cardinal Richelieu decided to reorganize the French cavalry, Esclainvilliers' company became part of the Cardinal Duc regiment. It fought in the Battle of Rocroi as a part of that unit. During this time the regiment became the Esclainvilliers Cavalry, the ancestor of the 3rd Cuirassier Regiment.

The regiment distinguished itself fighting in Flanders in 1650. In 1652, under the command of Turenne, it fought against the fronders in Paris and was present at Stenay. The unit was renamed as the Commissaire General Regiment in April 1656.

The regiment provided up to six companies in 1665 for the reconquest of Flanders, took part in the siege of Maastricht in 1673, and then served as a garrison for a time in Franche-Comté before it returned to Flanders. It stayed in Flanders during both the Nine Years' War and the War of Spanish Succession.

The regiment joined the Army of the Rhine at Landan in 1742 and distinguished itself at Ratisbon. It was sent to the Army of the Alps in 1746, but the war ended the next year with the Peace of Aix-la-Chapelle. During the Seven Years' War it was sent to Saint-Lô in 1762 to defend the French coastline. In 1791, the regiment was renamed as the 3rd Régiment de Cavalrie. In 1802/03 the Regiment was retitled the 3rd Cuirassiers.

== The Revolutionary Wars ==
During the French Revolutionary Wars and the Napoleonic Wars, the regiment fought in the battles of Valmy, Marengo.

== Napoleonic Wars ==
It took part in the battles of Austerlitz, Jena, Eylau, Heilsberg and Friedland.

In 1807 a detachment was sent to Spain where it was combined with detachments from the 1st and 2nd Cuirassiers and the 1st and 2nd Carabiniers to form the 1st Provisional Heavy Cavalry (designated as the 13th Cuirassiers at the end of 1808).

From 1809 on the regiment served in the battles of Eckmühl, Essling, Wagram, Ostrowono, Smolensk, Borodino, Dresden, Liebertwolkwitz, Leipzig, Champaubert, Fère-Champenoise.

During the First Restoration (1814), the regiment was given the designation of the Régiment de Cuirassiers du Dauphin. With the return of Napoleon I in 1815, the regiment was renamed the 3eme Régiment de Cuirassiers. It fought at Ligny and Waterloo. It was disbanded with the Second Restoration on 25 November.

== July Monarchy and Second Empire ==
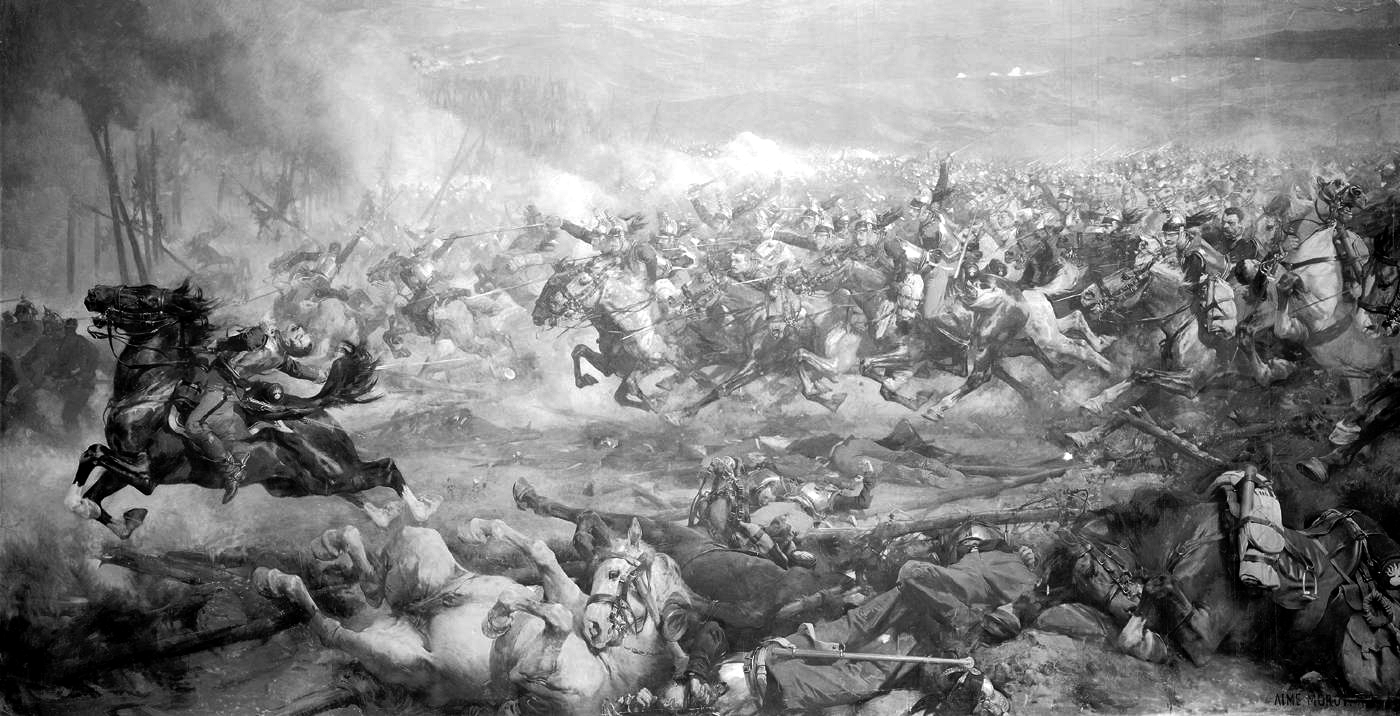
Battle of Wörth aka. Battle of Reichshoffen

The final fall of the Bourbons and the establishment of the July Monarchy mean that the regiment once again became the 3rd Cuirassier Regiment. Between 1830 and 1869, the regiment was in garrison in Lyon and Lunéville.

When war was declared between France and Prussia in 1870, the regiment was garrisoned in Lunéville. The regiment entered Haguenau on 2 August, then Reichshoffen, where it fought in the Battle of Wörth. There it took part in the great cavalry charge. The remains of the regiment withdrew in good order and arrived at Saverne on 7 August and after a short period of recovery there joined the Army of Châlons on 20 August 1870. After passing through Floing the regiment took part in the Battle of Sedan on 1 September. Together with the rest of its division, the regiment then became prisoners of the Prussian army.

Following release, the regiment was sent to Paris on the evening of 4 March 1871. Although designated as a "marching regiment" (ad hoc unit) it became the 3rd Cuirassier Regiment again on 1 April 1871.

== World War I ==
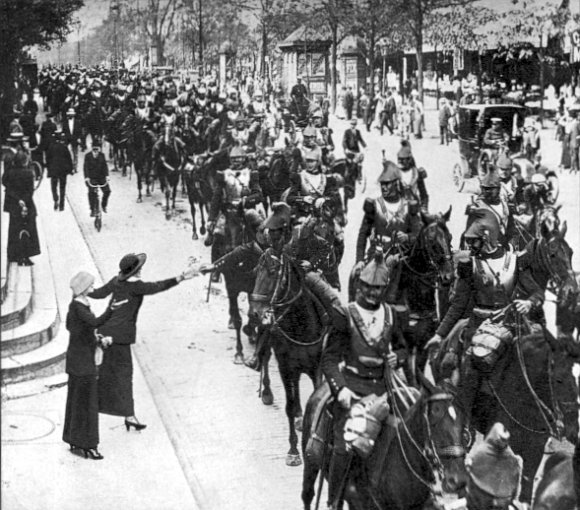
French cuirassiers on their way to the front in August 1914

The regiment crossed the Franco-Belgian border on 6 August and took part in the operations around Florenville. It also took part in engagements of the Great Retreat and the following Race to the Sea. At this early stage in the war it was still a horse-mounted formation wearing the plumed helmets and cuirasses of the Napoleonic period, with the colorful uniforms of peacetime. From November 1914 to March 1918 the 3rd Cuirassiers saw spells of service as temporarily dismounted cuirassiers a' pied in the trenches, in the North, the Somme, and Champagne. Except for these brief intervals, the 3rd retained its historic role as mounted heavy cavalry for most of the war, remaining in reserve behind the lines. Five of the other cuirassier regiments were fully converted to infantry after the opening stages of conflict.

The regiment was part of the 4th Cavalry Division, which took part in the offensives that brought victory to the allies, particularly in July 1918 at Saint-Pierre-Aigle and in August at Montdidier. The regiment was at Detergheim in Flanders, when the armistice was signed on 11 November 1918. It took part in the victory parade in Brussels ten days later.

The regiment received two new inscriptions on its standard for service during the war: "Belgique 1914-1918" and "Picardie 1918". The 3rd was dissolved in 1919 in the aftermath of the war, as part of a general reorganisation of the French heavy cavalry which saw the number of cuirassier regiments reduced from twelve to six.

== Battle of France ==
The regiment was reformed on 16 May 1940 as an armored unit in the region of Fontevraud-Saumur, as a part of the general mobilization for the war with Germany. It was equipped with SOMUA S35 and Hotchkiss H35 tanks and became part of the 4e Division cuirassée.

The regiment moved to Abbeville on 27 May, where it resisted the German advance, before being forced to retreat to Beauvais. During its retreat it fought rearguard actions at Cormonville and Cheverny. Hostilities were suspended on 25 June and cease-fire orders were given to all units; the regiment was dissolved on 31 July 1940.

== Algerian War ==
The 3rd Cuirassiers was reformed in 1952, and on 23 March 1956 the regiment disembarked in Oran, French Algeria, first moving to Tlemcen then Sebdou. It undertook internal security duties, guarding the Moroccan-Algerian border. The regiment took part in several operations in the area.

The regiment was reorganized as a reconnaissance unit on 1 April 1957, normally for service in Algeria. It would be reorganized several times during the war and in October 1962 it was attached to the 43rd Brigade, based at Mers El Kébir.

After eight years of service in Algeria, the regiment embarked for France on 4 June 1964. The regiment was dissolved on 15 June 1964 at Camp Sissonne.

== Last reformation ==
The regiment was reformed in 1968 in Chenevières, France, as an armored regiment of the 8th Motorized Brigade in Lunéville. It was originally equipped with AMX-13 tanks, but reequipped with the AMX-30 tanks in 1973.

The regiment was reorganized again in 1992, when some regiments of the French Forces in Germany were dissolved after the fall of the Berlin Wall and the end of the Cold War. The regiment absorbed the 2nd Squadron of the 5th Cuirassier Regiment and the E.E.D. of the 57th D.B.; a new squadron was also created and equipped with AMX-30B2 tanks.

A squadron was sent to the former Yugoslavia in 1994 as a part of the United Nations Protection Force; serving in Croatia for its four months deployment. The regiment also detached some officers as observers for the UN to the Western Sahara in 1997. The regiment was disbanded in 1998 as part of a general reorganisation of the French Army following the end of conscription.

== Honors ==
=== Battle Honors ===
- Marengo 1800
- Austerlitz 1805
- La Moskowa 1812
- Champaubert 1814
- Belgique 1914-1918
- Picardie 1918

=== Decorations ===
- Croix de guerre 1914-1918 with a silver star

== Lineage ==
- 1645: D'Esclainvilliers
- 1654: Commissaire Général
- 1791: 3rd Cavalry Regiment
- 1803: 3rd Cuirassier Regiment
- 1815: Cuirassiers du Dauphin
- 1815: 3rd Cuirassier Regiment
- 1815: Dissolved
- 1816: Cuirassiers d'Angoulème
- 1824: Cuirassiers de Bordeaux
- 1830: 3rd Cuirassier Regiment
- 1919: Dissolved
- 1940: 3rd Cuirassier Regiment
- 1940: Dissolved
- 1952: 3rd Cuirassier Regiment
- 1964: Dissolved
- 1968: 3rd Cuirassier Regiment
- 1998: Dissolved
