= Bonaventura Bottone =

British operatic tenor

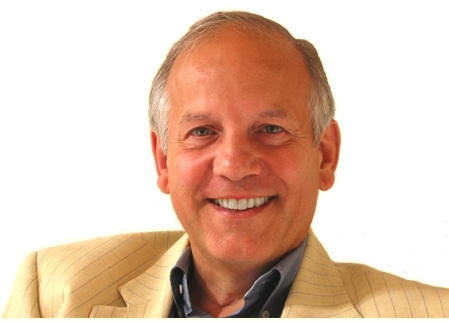
- Bonaventura Bottone, 2009
- Born: Bonaventura Bottone; 19 September 1950 (age 75); London, England
- Years active: 1972–present
- Spouse: Professor Jennifer Dakin

Bonaventura Bottone (born 19 September 1950 in London) is an operatic tenor who has performed at many of the world's leading opera houses. He trained at the Royal Academy of Music in London. The academy awarded him a Fellowship in 1998. He is described by the New Grove Dictionary of Opera as "a superb actor with a strong, lyrical voice" who "excels in comic roles".

== Early career ==
Bonaventura Bottone made his professional debut as Count Almaviva in The Barber of Seville with Welsh National Opera in 1973. He subsequently sang Arturo in Lucia di Lammermoor in Belfast, a Servant in Richard Strauss's Capriccio with Glyndebourne Festival Opera and Bardolfo in Verdi's Falstaff for Glyndebourne Touring Opera in 1976. He appeared at the Wexford Festival for three consecutive seasons (1977–1979) in Smetana's The Two Widows, Luigi and Federico Ricci's Crispino e la comare and Montemezzi's L'amore dei tre re.

== English National Opera ==
Bonaventura Bottone has enjoyed a long relationship with English National Opera. He has sung more than twenty roles with the company in diverse repertoire. His roles with the company include: Puccini's Rodolfo (La bohème), Luigi (Il tabarro), Pinkerton (Madama Butterfly); Verdi's Duke of Mantua (Rigoletto); Weill's Sam Kaplan (Street Scene); Gilbert and Sullivan's Nanki-Poo (The Mikado); Offenbach's Mercury (Orphée aux enfers) and Menelaus (La Belle Helene); Berlioz' Faust (La Damnation de Faust) and Tchaikovsky's Lensky (Eugene Onegin).

== Royal Opera House Covent Garden ==
Bottone's appearances at the Royal Opera House, Covent Garden include: Der Rosenkavalier (Italian Singer); Die Fledermaus (Alfred); Les Huguenots (Raoul); Otello (Cassio); Il viaggio a Reims (Count Libenskof); Capriccio (Italian Singer); Sweeney Todd (Pirelli), L'heure espagnole (Torquemade), La fanciulla del West (Nick), Adriana Lecouvreur (Abbé de Chazeuil) and Le Nozze di Figaro (Don Basilio). He also took part in Dame Joan Sutherland's farewell appearance at Covent Garden.

== Career in Britain ==
Bottone has also sung with: Welsh National Opera, where his roles have included Turridu (Cavalleria rusticana) and Le comte Ory; Opera North, where his roles have included Vana (Katya Kabanova), Pedrillo (Die Entführung aus dem Serail) and Nemorino (L'elisir d'amore); and Scottish Opera, where his roles have included Jack (The Midsummer Marriage), Narraboth (Salome) and Loge (Das Rheingold). For Glyndebourne Festival Opera, he has sung Alfred (Die Fledermaus), the Italian Tenor (Capriccio) and Tzar Berendey (The Snow Maiden).

== Career in Europe ==
Bonaventura Bottone's European engagements include: Die Fledermaus (Alfred) at the Opéra National de Paris Bastille; Der Rosenkavalier (Italian Singer) and Die Fledermaus (Alfred) at the Bayerische Staatsoper München; and The Mikado (Nanki-Poo) at the Teatro La Fenice in Venice.

== Career in North America ==
Bonaventura Bottone's North American engagements include: Capriccio (Italian Singer) and Andrea Chénier (Incredibile) at the Metropolitan Opera; Capriccio (Italian Tenor), Die Fledermaus (Alfred), Das Rheingold (Loge) and Sweeney Todd (Pirelli) at the Lyric Opera of Chicago; and Die Entführung aus dem Serail (Pedrillo) at Houston Grand Opera. In 2008, he was selected by Plácido Domingo and James Conlon to recreate the role of Licht in the forgotten Viktor Ullmann opera Der zerbrochene Krug (The Broken Jug) (Kleist).

== Roles ==
Amongst Bottone's roles are the fiollowing:

Loge – Bottone first performed the role of the fire god in Wagner's Das Rheingold in Richard Jones' ground-breaking production for Scottish Opera. Writing in the New Grove Dictionary of Opera, Elizabeth Forbes described his performance as "magnificent". Bottone revived the role for the Lyric Opera of Chicago in 2004 and 2005, receiving critical acclaim from the Associated Press/The New York Times,

Alfred – The amorous tenor from Strauss' 1874 comic opera Die Fledermaus has taken Bottone to houses as diverse as the Royal Opera House, Covent Garden (DVD available) Die Fledermaus, the Bayerische Staatsoper, the Opéra de Paris, Glyndebourne, Santiago de Chile and the Lyric Opera of Chicago. Nanki-Poo – Bottone performed 98 performances as the 'amorous second trombone' and son of the Mikado in the Jonathan Miller production for English National Opera.

Captain/Governor/Vanderdendur/Ragotski – Leonard Bernstein edited his original score of Candide for Scottish Opera, performed at the Theatre Royal, Glasgow in 1988. The four roles were re-written specifically for Bottone. He has performed the roles at the Royal Festival Hall, La Scala Milan and the English National Opera. He toured in Japan at Grand Hall, Hyogo and Orchard Hall, Bunkamura, Tokyo to critical acclaim.

== Concert performances ==
Bottone has an extensive concert repertoire, which has taken him to many of the world's leading concert halls. He has sung with numerous prominent international conductors, including: Richard Bonynge, Sir Andrew Davis, Jacques Delacote, Sir Edward Downes, Sir Mark Elder, Rafael Frühbeck de Burgos, Bernard Haitink KBE CH, Richard Hickox, Vladimir Jurowski, James Levine, Sir Charles Mackerras, Sir Neville Marriner, Carlo Rizzi and Jeffrey Tate.

== Vocal range ==
Bottone's vocal range is from C below middle C to D in Alt.

== Current activities ==
Bottone has retained much of his repertoire into his eighth decade. To this has been added a wide range of character repertoire, such as Loge (Das Rheingold), Benda (The Jacobin), Torquemade (L'heure espagnole), Nick (La fanciulla del West), Tzar Berendey (Snow Maiden), Don Ottavio (Don Giovanni).

He is a Patron of Bampton Classical Opera and led the jury for the company's Young Singers' Competition in 2019.

== Discography ==
- Bernstein Candide Audio CD (31 Dec 1993) Label: TER ASIN: B000003QTI
- Boulanger Vocal and Choral Works Audio CD (1 Oct 1999) Label: Chandos ASIN: B00000JWIU
- Cilea Adriana Lecouvreur DVD (2010 ROH) Label: Decca Music Group Limited 074 3459 DH2
- Donizetti Lucia di Lammermoor Audio CD (1 Oct 1999) Label: EMI ASIN: B00000DOC6
- Forrest Kismet Audio CD (16 April 1995) Label: Madacy ASIN: B000000KAF
- Forrest Kismet Audio CD (24 Sep 2007) Label: Golden Operetta Highlights ASIN: B000025HZ3
- Gilbert and Sullivan The Mikado Audio CD (22 Jan 2001) Label: TER ASIN: B000025HY6
- Gilbert and Sullivan The Mikado Audio CD (24 Nov 2008) Label: TER ASIN: B000025HXV
- Gilbert and Sullivan The Best of Gilbert and Sullivan Audio CD (16 April 1995) Label: Madacy ASIN: B000000KAL
- Offenbach Orpheus in the Underworld Audio CD (24 Sep 2007) Label: Golden Operetta Highlights ASIN: B000025HXC
- Romberg The Student Prince Audio CD (30 Jul 2001) Label: TER ASIN: B000003QTM
- Sondheim A Little Night Music Audio CD (1990 Jay Productions Ltd) Label: TER 1179
- Strauss, Johann Die Fledermaus DVD (19 December 2000) Studio: Image Entertainment ASIN: B00004Z4VP
- Tippett The Ice Break Audio CD (1 Nov 1991) Label: Virgin Classics ASIN: B000027KNF
- Ullmann Der zerbrochene Krug DVD (March 2008 Los Angeles Opera) Label: Arthaus Music 101 527
- Vaughan Williams Hugh the Drover Audio CD (27 Sep 1994) Label: Hyperion ASIN: B000002ZYJ
- Verdi Otello Audio CD (10 Sep 2001) Label: Chandos ASIN: B00005OBRW
- Weill Street Scene Audio CD (30 Jul 2001) Label: Classics ASIN: B000025HXK
- Various An Evening of Operetta Audio CD (1 Jan 1991) Label: Koch ASIN: B000023YW8
- various All-Star Tenors Salute The World Audio CD (1990 Jay Productions Ltd/1994 Sony Music Entertainment Inc) MFK 64 394
- RLPO Live Summer Pops. Carl Davis'Summer Pops Album CD (Recorded at the RLPO Concert 25 April 1999 Philharmonic Hall) RLCD 103
- RLPO and Leeds Castle, A Classical Celebration (Rec 'RLPO & RLPChoir, Phil' Hall 29/30 March 1999.c. Davis. Bottone. White) RLCD 151
