= Radacz =

- Village
- Location within Poland
- Coordinates: 53°43′N 16°32′E
- Country: Poland
- Voivodeship: West Pomeranian
- County: Szczecinek
- Gmina: Borne Sulinowo

Radacz [ˈradat͡ʂ] (German: Raddatz) is a village in the administrative district of Gmina Borne Sulinowo, within Szczecinek County, West Pomeranian Voivodeship, in north-western Poland. It lies approximately 16 km (10 mi) north of Borne Sulinowo, 10 km (6 mi) west of Szczecinek, and 134 km (83 mi) east of the regional capital Szczecin.

The village is situated in the historic region of Farther Pomerania.

== History ==
The settlement was first mentioned in a 1403 deed, when the area was part of the Imperial Duchy of Pomerania. The estates were held by the Kleist noble family. After the Griffin dukes became extinct, Raddatz was incorporated into the Brandenburg-Prussian province of Pomerania in 1653.

The parish church was erected in 1744; it housed the personal carriage of the Polish king John III Sobieski, which was brought here by Field Marshal Henning Alexander von Kleist in the First Silesian War and rebuilt as a pulpit (today on display in the Museum of King John III's Palace at Wilanów).

The von Kleist dynasty held the manor until the late 19th century. After World War II, the region fell to the Republic of Poland. The remaining German population was expelled and Radacz manor became a State Agricultural Farm (PGR). For the history of the region, see History of Pomerania.

== Notable people ==
- Henning Alexander von Kleist (1677–1749), Field Marshal
- Henning Alexander von Kleist (1707–1784), Lieutenant-General.
