= Garrison School =

Garrison School may refer to:

- Garrison school, a type of school for children of soldiers in 18th century Russia
- Garrison School (Rockford, Illinois), US
- William Lloyd Garrison School, Boston, Massachusetts, US
- Garrison School Historic District, Liberty, Missouri, US
- Garrison Union Free School, Putnam County, New York, US
- Garrison Independent School District, Nacogdoches County, Texas, US
  - Garrison High School
- Kleist Museum, in Frankfurt (Oder), Germany, formerly the Garnisonsschule ('Garrison School')
- Garrison Cadet College Kohat, Pakistan
