= Kleist Museum =

Coordinates: 52°20′38″N 14°33′26″E

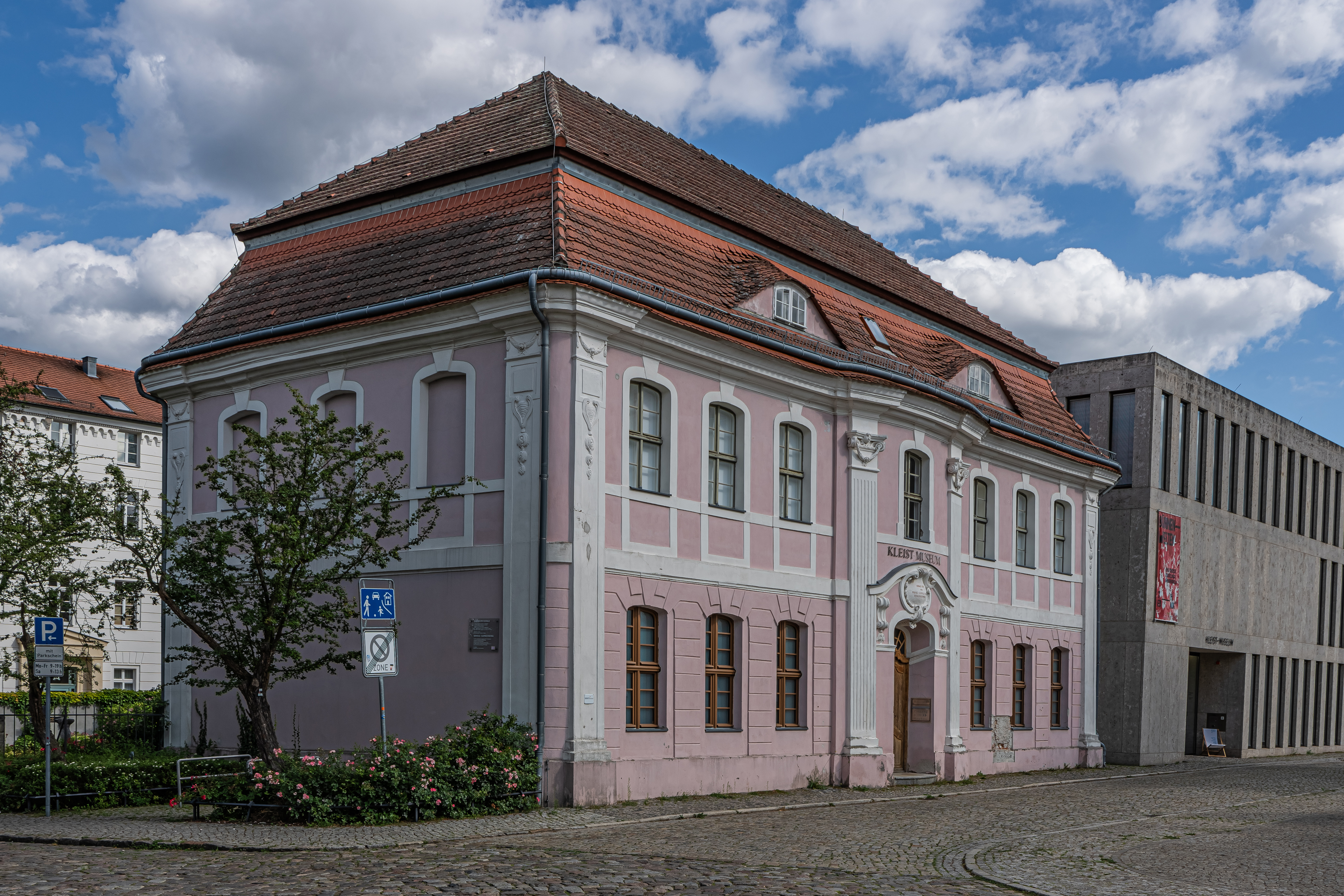
Kleist Museum, in the former Garrison School

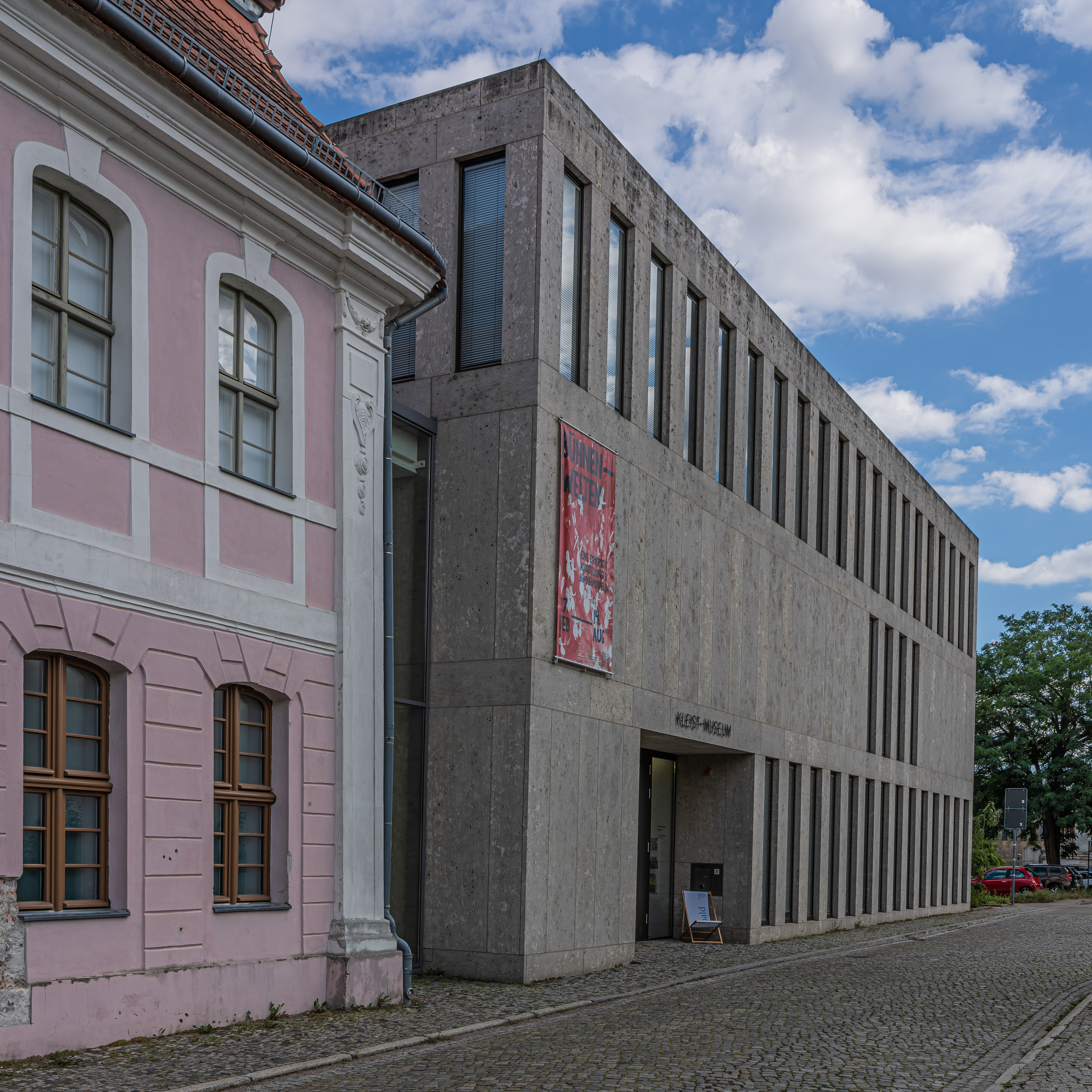
The new building

The Kleist Museum, located at Faberstraße 7 in Frankfurt an der Oder, Germany, is a museum dedicated to the life and work of Heinrich von Kleist.

== History ==
In 1922/23 the first museum was opened in the house where Kleist was born, organised by the Kleist Society. In 1937 the Kleist exhibition from the Oderland Museum in the Lienau House was integrated into the Kleist House collection. Both the Kleist House and the Lienau House were destroyed by fire in April 1945.

After the end of the war a new collection was gradually pieced together in the municipal library. After the conversion of the former Garrison School ("Garnisonsschule") the collection was moved there. The building and collection were officially opened on 20 September 1969 as the Kleist-Gedenk- und Forschungsstätte ("Kleist Memorial and Research Site"). On 21 October 1995 the Kleist- Gedenk- und Forschungsstätte e.V. was established, which has since operated the Kleist Museum.

== Description ==
Besides the care of the surviving intellectual and literary legacy of Heinrich von Kleist the museum also includes in its remit the literary legacy of his relatives Ewald Christian von Kleist and Franz Alexander von Kleist, and also of Caroline and Friedrich de la Motte Fouqué. Readings, lectures and literary-musical events corresponding to whatever exhibition is on display take place regularly. In June the summer festival is held, and in October the Kleist Festtage.

The museum collections include the art collection, consisting of works inspired by Kleist and his works; the "Theatralia", consisting of materials relating to the production of his dramatic works; the "Musealia", which are objects associated with his life; and items in various other media.

The museum's library is a specialist and research library relating to Heinrich von Kleist and his time. It contains around 10,000 volumes.

On 17 October 2013 a new building was opened, costing 5.4 million euros, and linked to the now protected Garrison School building by a structure of glass and steel.

== Sources ==
- Wolfgang Barthel: Das Kleist-Museum in Frankfurt (Oder) 1953–2003. Frankfurt (Oder), Kleist-Museum 2003. ISBN 3-9808900-1-5
