= Friedrich Graf Kleist von Nollendorf =

Prussian field marshal (1762–1823)

Generalfeldmarschall Friedrich von Kleist Graf von Nollendorf
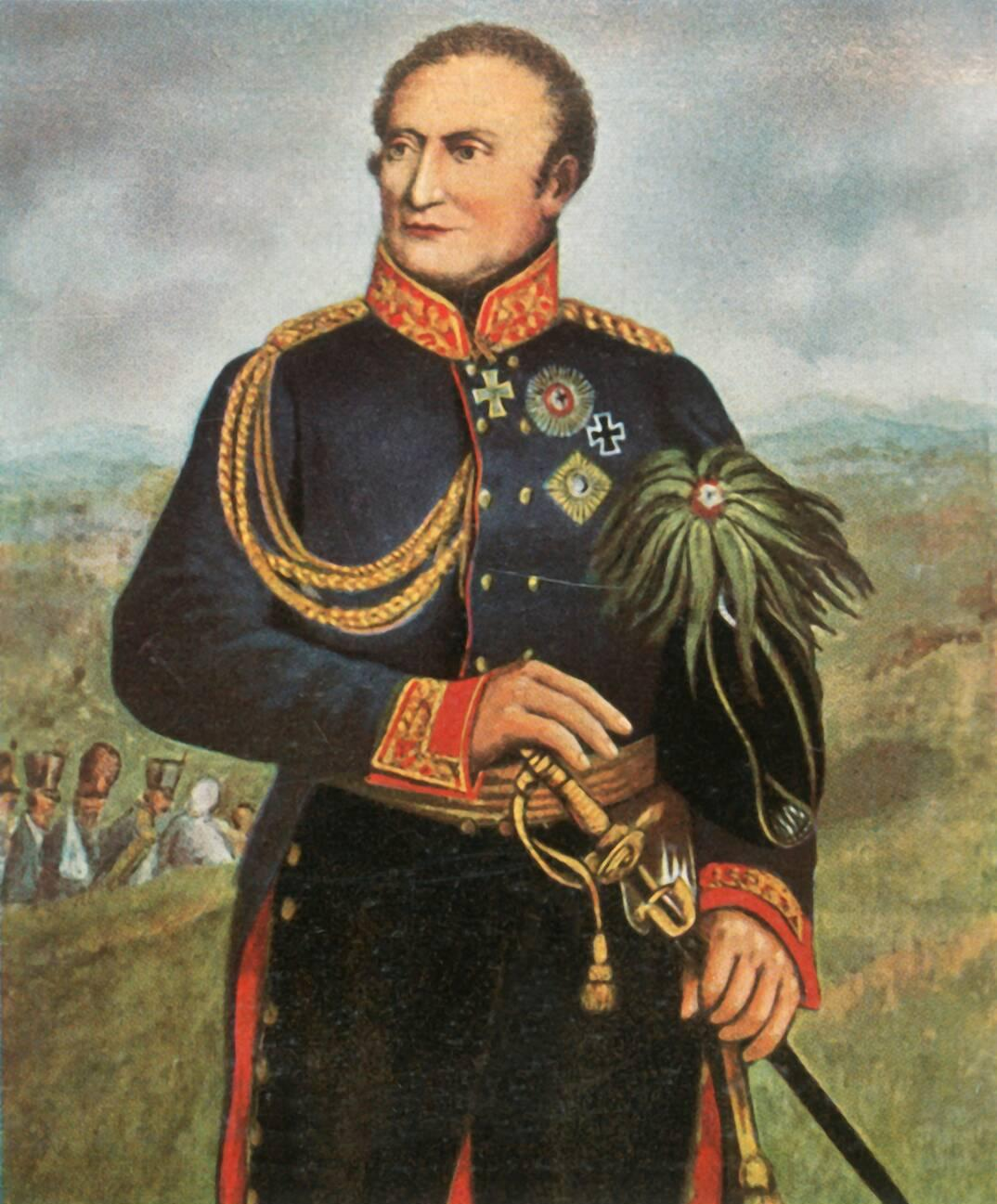
- Friedrich von Kleist, woodcut by Hermann Scherenberg in 1863
- Born: 9 April 1762; Berlin, Kingdom of Prussia, Holy Roman Empire
- Died: 17 February 1823 (aged 60); Berlin, Kingdom of Prussia, German Confederation
- Spouse: Hermine Caroline Charlotte von Retzow (m. 1787)
- Children: 3, including Hermann von Nollendorf
- Relatives: Kleist family
- Military career
- Allegiance: Kingdom of Prussia
- Branch: Prussian Army
- Rank: Generalfeldmarshall
- Commands: North German Corps
- Wars: See battles: War of the Bavarian Succession; French Revolutionary Wars; Napoleonic Wars; War of the Fourth Coalition; Battle of Jena–Auerstedt; War of the Sixth Coalition; German Campaign; Battle of Bautzen; Battle of Kulm; Battle of Dresden; Battle of Liebertwolkwitz; Battle of Leipzig; Campaign of France; Battle of Vauchamps; Battle of Gué-à-Tresmes; Battle of Laon; Battle of Paris
- Awards: Knight of the Black Eagle; Order of the Red Eagle; Grand Cross of the Iron Cross; Pour le Mérite; Knight of the Legion of Honour; Order of St. Vladimir; Knight of St. John

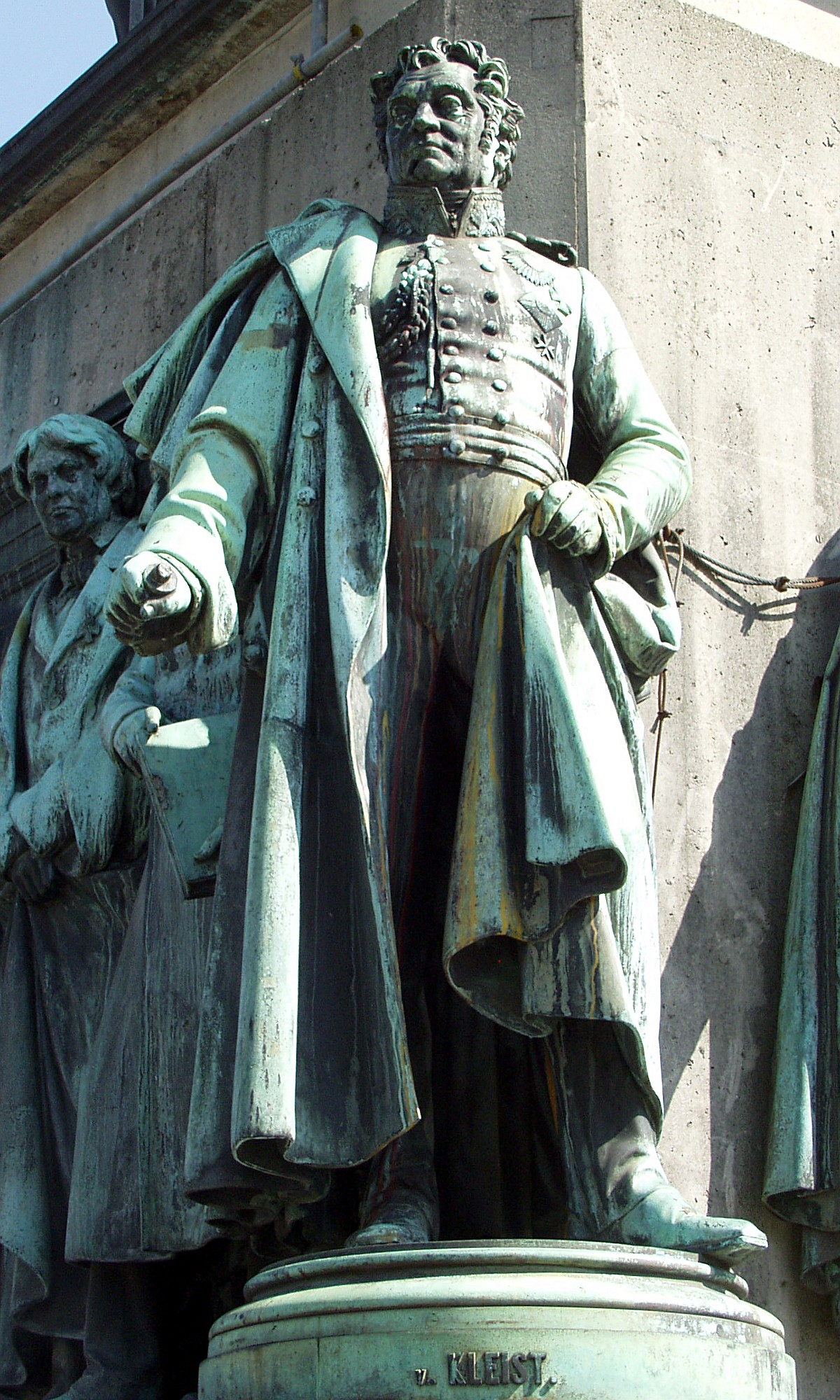
Graf Kleist von Nollendorf at the base of the monument to Frederick William III in Cologne

Friedrich Emil Ferdinand Heinrich von Kleist, granted the title Graf Kleist von Nollendorf from 1814 onwards (9 April 1762 – 17 February 1823), was a Prussian field marshal and a member of the old junker family von Kleist. He was a prominent figure in Prussian military during the Napoleonic Wars.

== Biography ==
Kleist entered the Prussian Army in 1778 and served in the War of the Bavarian Succession and the French Revolutionary Wars. By 1799, Kleist had been promoted to major and was put in command of a battalion of grenadiers.

Kleist served in the Napoleonic Wars and fought at Jena. In 1807 he went on extended leave but by 1808 he was put in command of an infantry brigade and the next year he was made commandant of Berlin. During the War of Liberation he was given a corps with which he fought in the battles of Kulm and Leipzig. In 1814, he was given the title Count of Nollendorf (from the German name of the town Nakléřov, now part of Petrovice in the Czech Republic) for his decisive role in this battle.

After Leipzig, Kleist blockaded the fortress of Erfurt, bringing about its surrender after which, in early 1814, he marched his troops into France, where his corps was attached to Blücher's army. He then fought in the battle of Laon and in the attack on Paris. At the end of the war Kleist was promoted to the rank of General der Infanterie. During the Hundred Days, Kleist was given command of a Prussian corps (the North German Corps) which was to operate independently from Blücher's Army of the Lower Rhine; he was therefore not involved in the battles of Ligny and Waterloo.

Two years before his death he was promoted to the rank of Generalfeldmarschall ("field marshal").
