= Franz Alexander von Kleist =

German poet

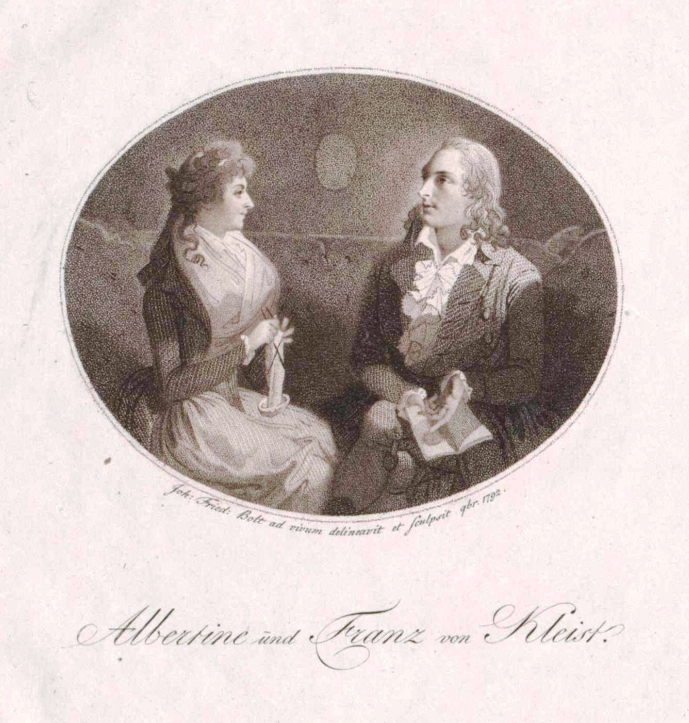
Albertine (1774–1855) und Franz Alexander von Kleist (1769–1797)

Franz Alexander von Kleist (24 December 1769 – 8 August 1797) was a German poet of the late 18th century.

== Life ==
Franz Alexander was a member of the noble Pomeranian von Kleist family. He was born in Potsdam, son of General Franz Kasimir von Kleist (1736–1808) and his wife Caroline Luise Eleonore Johanne (also née von Kleist, but of the Zützen branch of the family; 1747–1780). General Friedrich Ludwig Heinrich von Kleist was his younger brother.

In 1784, Franz Alexander entered the Prussian Infantry Regiment of the Duke of Brunswick ("Herzog von Braunschweig"). His regiment was stationed in Halberstadt, where he came into close contact with Johann Wilhelm Ludwig Gleim, who because of his earlier friendship with Ewald Christian von Kleist, who fell in battle in 1759, had a particular inclination towards him. Franz Alexander is reckoned as a member of the Halberstadt Poetry Circle ("Halberstädter Dichterkreis"). He wrote several texts while he was in Halberstadt. After he left the town, he kept up a correspondence with Gleim until his early death.

He took part in the campaign of 1789, then left the army and went to Berlin. Under Minister Ewald Friedrich von Hertzberg he became an attaché in 1791. In January 1792, he married Albertine von Jungk (1774–1855) and left government service in the following year.

He bought the estate of his deceased father-in-law, Falkenhagen near Frankfurt (Oder), sold it again and settled at Ringenwalde near Neudamm in the Neumark, where he died before he was 28. His widow married again in 1800 to Captain Ferdinand von Waldow of Dannenwalde in Gransee.

== Works ==
During his short life, Franz Alexander published a great deal. He was much read in his lifetime and immediately after his death, and then almost entirely forgotten. His literary legacy is preserved in the Kleist Museum in Frankfurt (Oder).

== Children ==
By his wife Albertine, he had the following children:

- Ferdinand (died young)
- Karl (died young)
- Adelaide (21 October 1794 – 16 August 1854); married Major General Ludwig Georg Adam von Wurmb (2 May 1788 – 28 February 1855).

== Sources ==
- Anke Tanzer: "Mein theurer zweiter Kleist": Franz Alexander von Kleist (1769-1797) - Leben und Werk; mit einer umfassenden Bibliographie der Primär- und Sekundärliteratur und einer kritischen Beschreibung der Autographen. Igel-Verlag, Oldenburg 1998; ISBN 3896210874
- Karl Heinrich Jördens, Lexikon deutscher Dichter und Prosaisten, vol. 6, p. 393, online at Google books
