= Franz Kasimir von Kleist =

Franz Kasimir von Kleist (25 January 1736 – 30 March 1808) was an infantry general of the Kingdom of Prussia. In 1806 as Governor of Magdeburg he capitulated to Napoleon's troops, for which he was posthumously condemned to death.

== Life and career ==
Kleist was born in Stettin, the youngest son of Lt Gen Franz Ulrich von Kleist and his first wife Luise Eleonore (née von Putlitz). In 1762 he was appointed adjutant to King Frederick II of Prussia. In 1788 he was promoted to major general and commander in chief of the Old Prussian Infantry Regiment No. 12 (1806) (the Regiment Wunsch zu Fuß). In 1800 he was appointed commander in chief of the Old Prussian Infantry Regiment No. 5 (1806) (the Regiment Kalkstein zu Fuß) and Governor of Magdeburg.

Since no building work had taken place on the Magdeburg Fortress since 1740, and no maintenance had been carried out since the end of the 18th century, the fortress was in no condition to resist modern weapons technology. After the capitulations of Prenzlau, Stettin, Spandau and Küstrin Kleist thought resistance pointless and felt himself forced to surrender the fortress on 8 November 1806 to Marshal Ney, with approximately 24,000 men, 600 guns and great quantities of supplies. This surrender without any fighting was extremely controversial then as now: the fortress was given up after a siege of only three weeks and despite the fact that the defenders outnumbered the invading French troops.

Kleist's conduct was the subject of the Immediatuntersuchungskommission, the commission of investigation held by Prussia into the humiliating defeat of its army in the War of the Fourth Coalition of 1806–07. The commission met by order of King Frederick William III of Prussia from 27 November to 6 December 1807 and continued working until 1812. On the basis of the commission's findings many officers were discharged, quite a few of them dishonourably. In several instances court martial proceedings were also undertaken. Some of the accused were sentenced to imprisonment, while Colonel von Ingersleben, commandant of the fortress of Küstrin, and General von Kleist as Governor of Magdeburg, were condemned to death. However, von Ingersleben was sentenced in his absence, and died abroad, and Kleist had already died before the proceedings.

Citation from the proceedings of September 1808 on the capitulation of Magdeburg: "If General v. K. were still alive, on account of the hasty surrender, thoroughly counter to his duty, of the important fortress of Magdeburg to the French, he would be put before a firing squad." ("Der General v. K. wäre, wenn er noch lebte, wegen der übereilten und durchaus pflichtwidrigen Übergabe der wichtigen Festung Magdeburg an die Franzosen zu arquebusieren.")

== Family ==
Kleist's wife was also a Kleist, from the Zützen branch of the family: Caroline Luise Eleonore Johanne von Kleist (7 December 1747 – 1780). She was the daughter of Colonel Karl Wilhelm von Kleist (1707–1766) and his wife Eva Luise Eleonore (née von Schlomach; 1726–1813). The couple had the following children:

- Franz Alexander (24 December 1769 – 8 August 1797) married Albertine von Jungk
- Georg (born and died 1770)
- Friedrich Ludwig Heinrich (11 March 1771 – 16 April 1838) married 10 June 1799 Charlotte Marianne Sophie Luise Eleonore von Donop (28 February 1777 – 4 April 1855)
- Caroline (born 1767)
- Wilhelmine Luise Caroline Johanna (died 1839) married – von Waldow

== Sources ==
- Gustav Kratz, H. Kypke: Die Biographien der Muttrin-Damenschen Linie. In: Geschichte des Geschlechts von Kleist. Teil 3, Abteilung 3, Trowitzsch & Sohn, Berlin 1885–1887, p. 444 (Online)
- 1806 – Das Preussische Offizierkorps und die Untersuchung der Kriegsereignisse (ed. by the Great General Staff, History of War Department II). Berlin 1906 (Online; PDF-Datei; 97 kB)
- Kurt von Priesdorff: Soldatisches Führertum, vol. 2, Hanseatische Verlagsanstalt, Hamburg 1937, Nr. 772
- Anton Balthasar König: Biographisches Lexikon aller Helden und Militairpersonen, vol. 2, p. 291, online at google.books.de
