= Frederick William von Kleist =

German officer

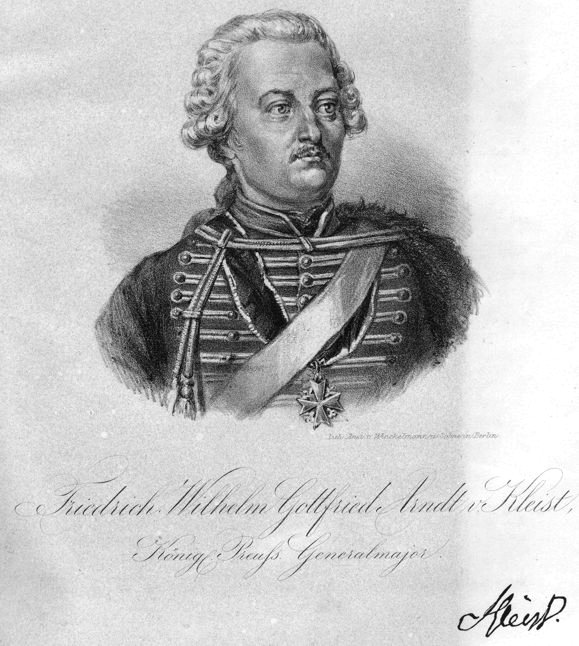
- Major General Frederick William Gottfried Arnd von Kleist
- Born: 29 August 1724; Potsdam, Prussia
- Died: 28 August 1767 (aged 42); Liegnitz
- Relatives: 58 relatives served in the Prussian military in the Seven Years War: see Kleist family
- Military career
- Allegiance: Prussia
- Branch: Prussian Army
- Service years: 1747–1767
- Rank: Major General
- Nickname: "Green Kleist"
- Commands: Gendarmes Berlin 1747–1756; Hussar Regiment Szekely (Green Hussar Regiment) (1756–1767)
- Conflicts: Seven Years' War
- Awards: Order Pour le Merite; Equestrian Statue of Frederick the Great.

Friedrich Wilhelm Gottfried Arnd von Kleist (29 August 1724 – 28 August 1767) was a Kingdom of Prussian military officer, who rose to the rank of major general. In the Seven Years' War, he organized and commanded the Freikorps Kleist. He was also known as Green Kleist for his command of the Green Hussar regiment, and to distinguish him from the 58 other members of the Kleist family who served in the war. He received the Order Pour le Mérite and is one of the 25 generals depicted on the Equestrian Statue of Frederick the Great.

== Family ==
Friedrich Wilhelm Gottfried Arnd von Kleist came from the Kleist family. He was the fourth son of the royal Prussian colonel and heir to Schmenzin and Stavenow Andreas Joachim von Kleist (1678–1738) and Marie Elisabeth von Hake (1700–1758). He remained unmarried, but had fifteen siblings (ten brothers and five sisters), and appointed his youngest brother, Major General Hans Reimar von Kleist (1736–1806), as his heir. Many members of the Stavenow branch of the family, to which Kleist belonged, figured prominently in the military activities of Frederick William I and his son, Frederick II. The family had two major land owners, Andreas Joachim von Kleist and his son, Joachim Friedrich, who were both officers in the Prussian army, as were another eight of Andreas Joachim's 10 sons. In total, 58 officers with the name Kleist served in the Seven Years' War; twenty-three died.

== Military career ==
Like many Prussian youngsters, Kleist's military career emulated that of other junker sons. Many junkers owned immense estates, especially in the north-eastern part of Prussia, specifically, the provinces of Brandenburg, Pomerania, Silesia, West Prussia, East Prussia and Posen. The local government sent lists of young men aged between 12 and 18 to Berlin and the youngsters received orders to proceed to cadet academies (Kadettenhaus) or military academies in Berlin. Such service had been required since the ascension of Frederick William I, and firmly established the participation of the landed aristocracy in the Prussian military.

Kleist began his 20-year military career at the gendarmes in Berlin, on garrison duty. In 1756, at the onset of the Seven Years' War, Frederick II transferred him to Hussar Regiment Szekely. On 26 August 1756, when the Prussian Army invaded Saxony, the regiment was part of the left column led by the Augustus William, Duke of Brunswick-Bevern. Initially concentrated in the area of Lübben, the column advanced through Lusatia via Hoyerswerda and Bautzen; by 8 September, the column had reached Hohenstein then marched toward the Elbe near Pirna. On 1 October, eight of its squadrons took part in the action at Lobositz, covering the left flank. It did not participate in the second attack against Browne's Austrians.

In mid-April 1757, the regiment formed part of the army that invaded Bohemia. On 6 May, although in the region, the regiment did not take part to the Battle of Prague. Instead, it was deployed on the left bank of the Moldau near the Weissenberg as part of Field Marshal James Keith's corps. On 18 June, five squadrons of the regiment took part to the Battle of Kolin. They were deployed in the cavalry vanguard on the extreme left under General von Zieten. At the end of August, the regiment was part of the small Prussian army assembled at Dresden by Frederick II to head towards Thuringia and to offer battle to the Franco-Imperial army invading Saxony. On 14 September, when Frederick was forced to divide his army to contain the French in the region of Magdeburg and to secure the Prussian magazines in the area of Torgau, the regiment remained with Frederick at Erfurt to observe the Franco-Imperial army. On 15 September, the regiment was part of Seydlitz's force which occupied Gotha.

On 19 September 1757, while patrolling with a Szekely battalion near Gotha, Kleist distinguished himself: the approaching imperial and French armies outnumbered the Prussians holding Erfurt and the Prussians evacuated the city before the Austrians arrived. The Prussian force, under the overall command of James Keith and locally by Friedrich Wilhelm von Seydlitz, managed to retake Erfurt three days later. He received the Order Pour le Mérite.

In 1759, Kleist became chief of Regiment Szekely, also called the Greens (due to the dominant color of their uniforms), a position he held until his death; henceforth he was also known as Green Kleist. In 1760, Kleist was promoted to the rank of colonel. On 15 August 1760, the Kleist Hussars played an essential role in the Battle of Leignitz. At a point when the outcome was in the balance, 14 full squadrons of Kleist cavalry hit the enemy cavalry; the latter fled and the Prussians took the battlefield.

In early 1761, Kleist was appointed to lead a Freikorps, or an independent corps, with which he achieved some of his greatest successes. The Freikorps consisted of 22 squadrons of hussars and dragoons, including the so-called "Croatian Battalion", and a Fußjägerkorps (comparable to light infantry). With his Freikorps, he was dispatched again toward Erfurt, this time arriving on 24 February. The city's gates were closed and the citizens were on alert. Kleist appeared with 200 hussars, demanding entrance; another battalion arrived a short time later. Capitulation terms were arranged and the city paid 150,000 thalers to get rid of the invaders. Kleist took the money and pressed toward Gotha, then to Hunfeld and then to Fulda. The punitive and profitable expedition ended soon, though. As the Austrians began to consolidate their forces, the Prussians retired out of range. In 1762, Kleist was promoted to major general.

=== Glorious Raid: 1762 ===
By November 1762, part of the Imperial army garrisoned Dresden, with 13 battalions of infantry; the rest of the Imperial army remained at Altenberg. Frederick and his army began the winter in Leipzig. Neither group had any plans for further operations other than watching the enemy's lines of communication. At this point in the stalemate, Frederick's brother, Henry, unleashed a portion of Kleist's Freikorps on a Glorious Raid, with instructions to plunder and lay waste to the more affluent states of the Holy Roman Empire. Kleist was instructed to seize at least a half million thalers from the enemy countryside and towns; Henry planned to break the Imperial resistance.

Kleist took full advantage of this order. He acquired hostages and shelled towns: Bamberg, Würzburg and Erlangen fell to him. Captives and contributions were sent to Leipzig, where Frederick was headquartered. In late November, Kleist and his hussars were chased out of Imperial territories, back to Leipzig. This situation did not last for long. In mid-December, the Austrians refused to parlay, leaving the Imperial territories vulnerable to Prussian incursion as long as Austria remained at war with Frederick. The Freikorps was disbanded in 1763 after the conclusion of the war.

=== Last years and death ===
Kleist spent the remaining years of his life between Berlin and his estate near Liegnitz, where he died on 28 August 1768, one day short of his 43rd birthday. Frederick memorialized Kleist with a plaque on the obelisk in his castle grounds of Rheinsberg; in 1851, the King's great-great nephew, Frederick William III memorialized Kleist on the base of the Equestrian statue of Frederick the Great in Berlin, next to the cavalry figure of Duke Ferdinand von Braunschweig.
