= Hermann Scherenberg =

German painter, illustrator and caricaturist

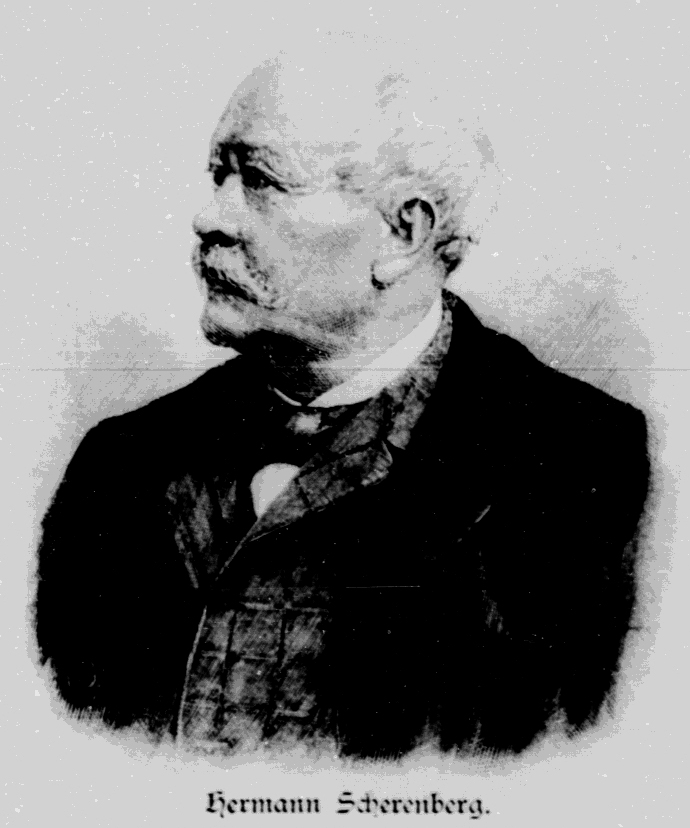
Hermann Scherenberg (1896)

Hermann Scherenberg (20 January 1826, Swinemünde - 21 August 1897, Berlin) was a German painter, illustrator and caricaturist.

== Biography ==
According to Theodor Fontane, who knew the Scherenbergs and wrote about them in his autobiography, the family originally came from Westphalia and his father, Johann Friedrich Scherenberg, lived in the Huguenot colony in Swinemünde. Hermann was born to Johann's second wife. His older half-brother was the poet, Christian Friedrich Scherenberg. He was also related to the poet and journalist, Ernst Scherenberg.

From 1846 to 1847, he studied painting at the Kunstakademie Düsseldorf, under the tutelage of Theodor Hildebrandt.

For many years, he was an employee of the Illustrirte Zeitung, providing hundreds of illustrations. He drew portraits of prominent personalities and major events from Prussian and German history as well as scenes from everyday life.

He had one son, Hans, who apparently also became a painter, although no further information is available.

He was interred at the Luisenstädtischer Friedhof in Berlin. The gravesite has not been preserved.

== Selected works ==
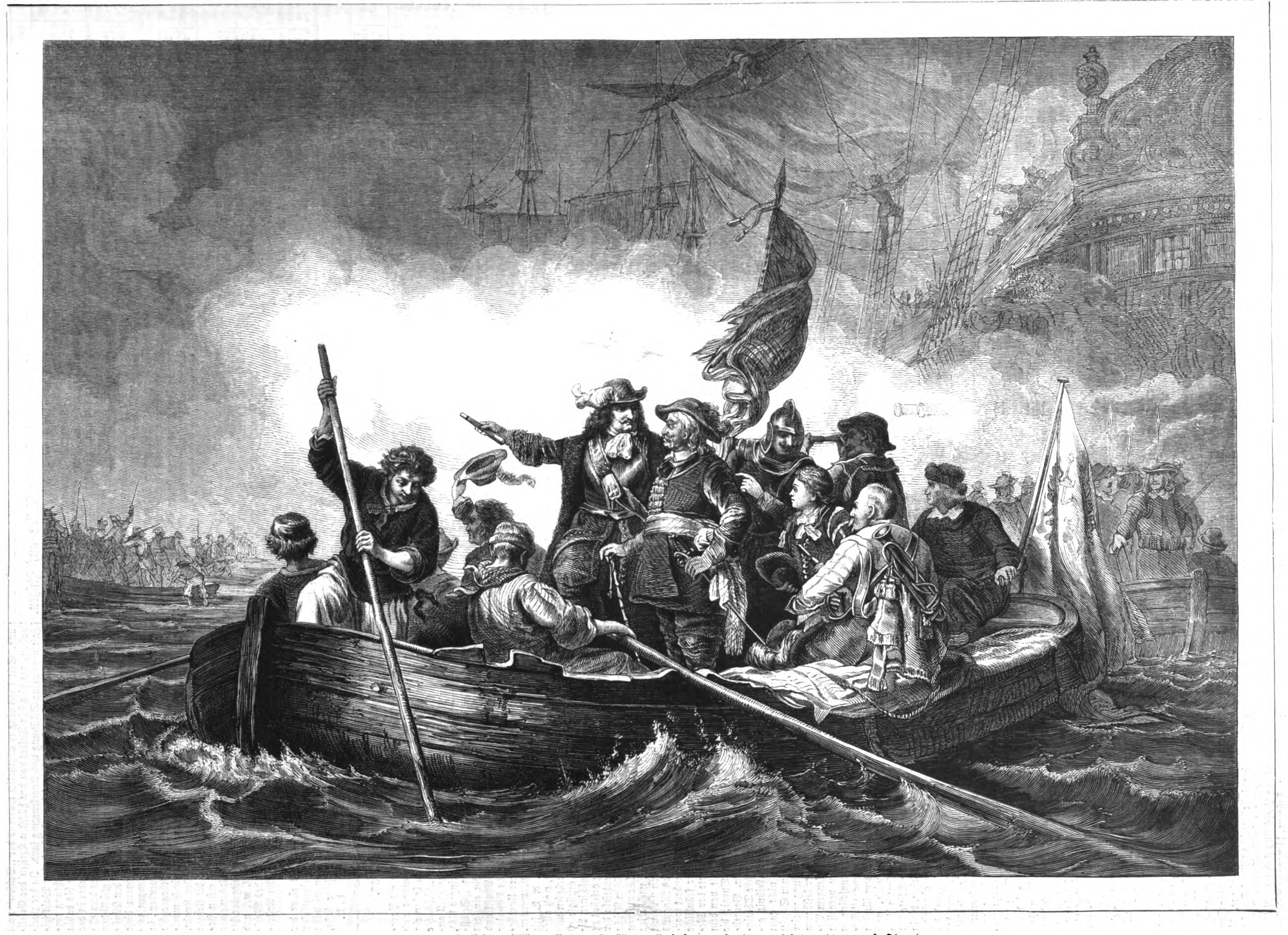
The Great Elector Landing on Rügen

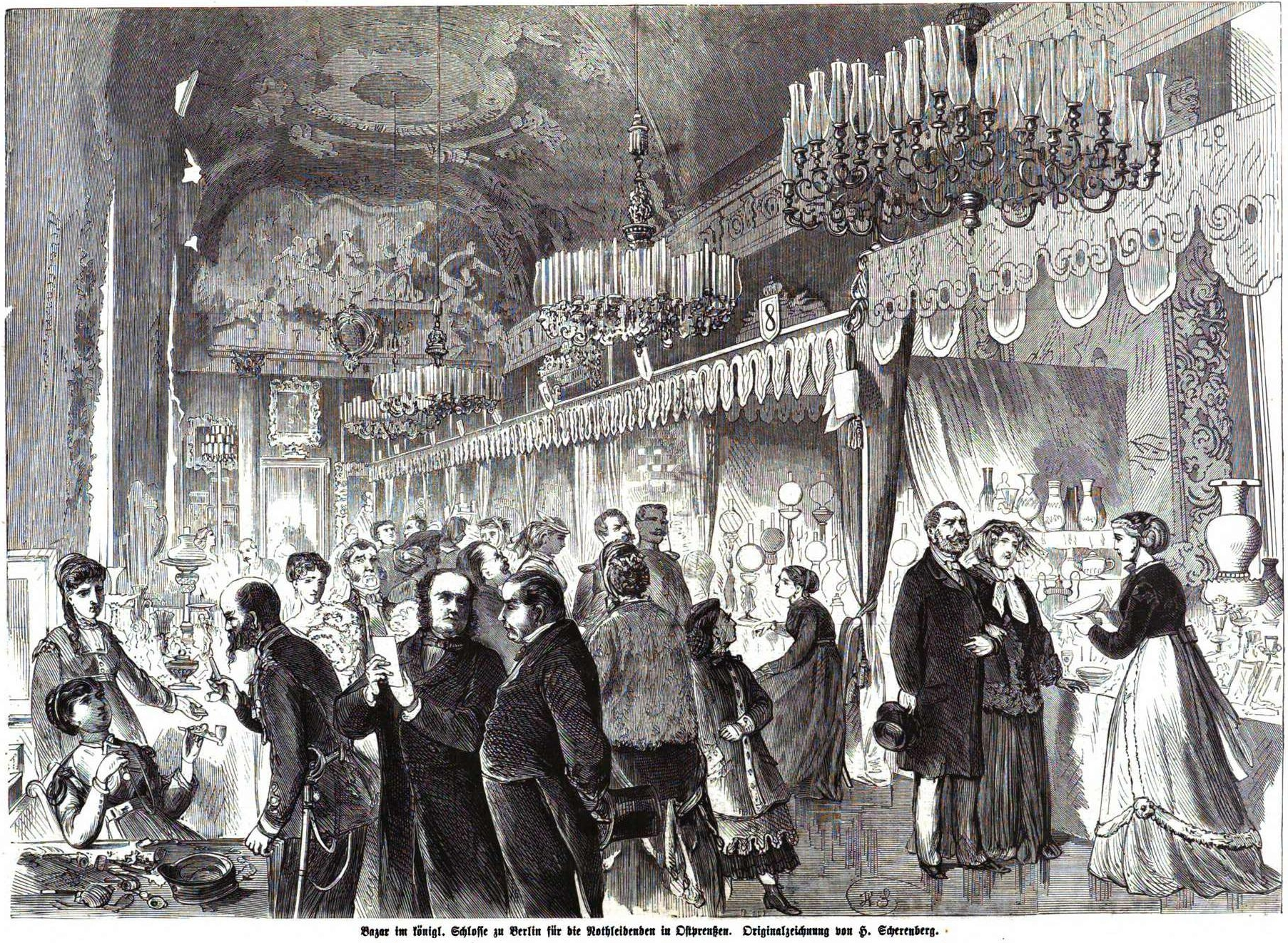
Benefit Bazaar at the Berlin Palace

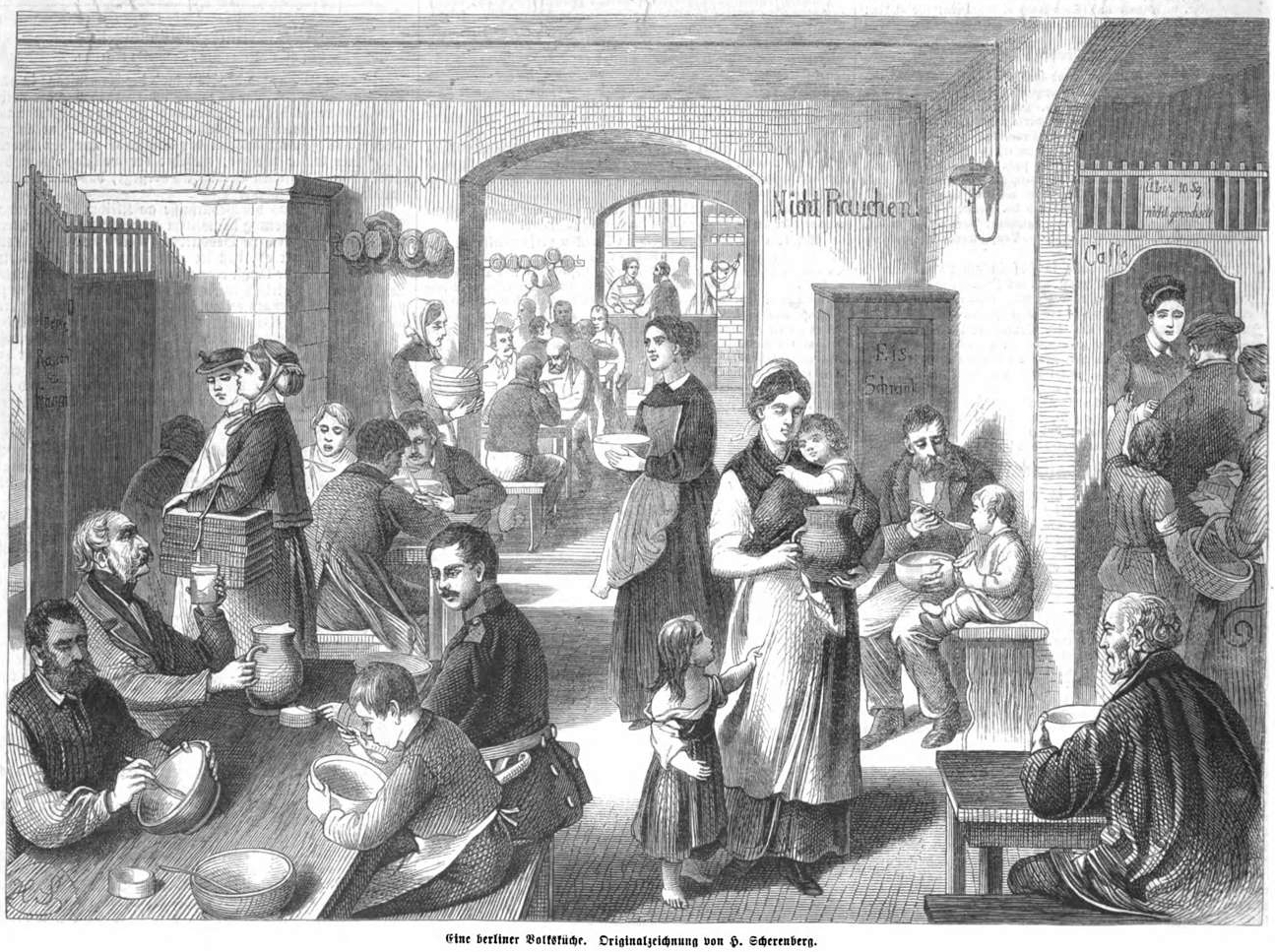
A Soup Kitchen in Berlin (1868)

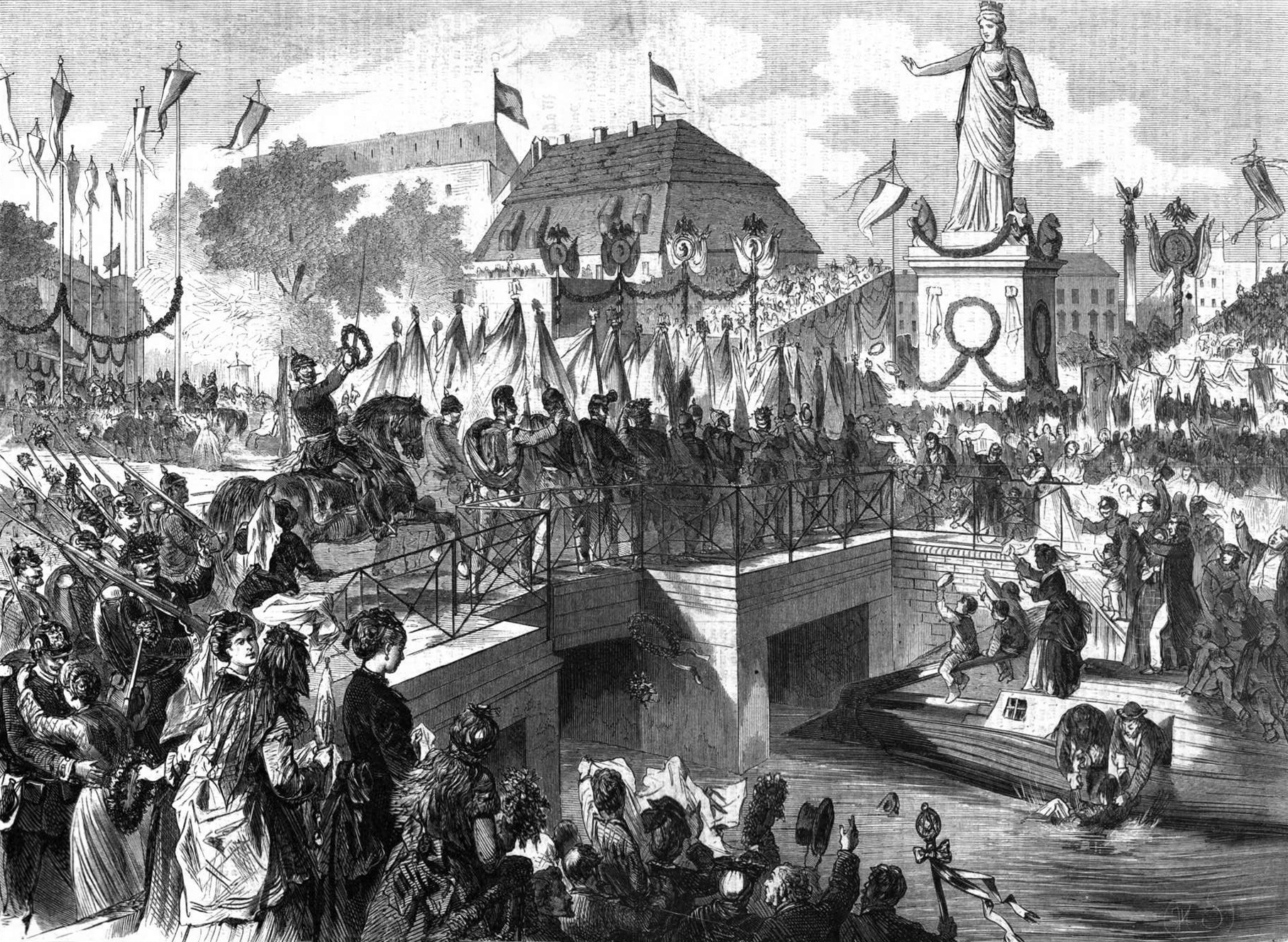
Return of the Victorious Army (1871)
