= Henning Alexander von Kleist =

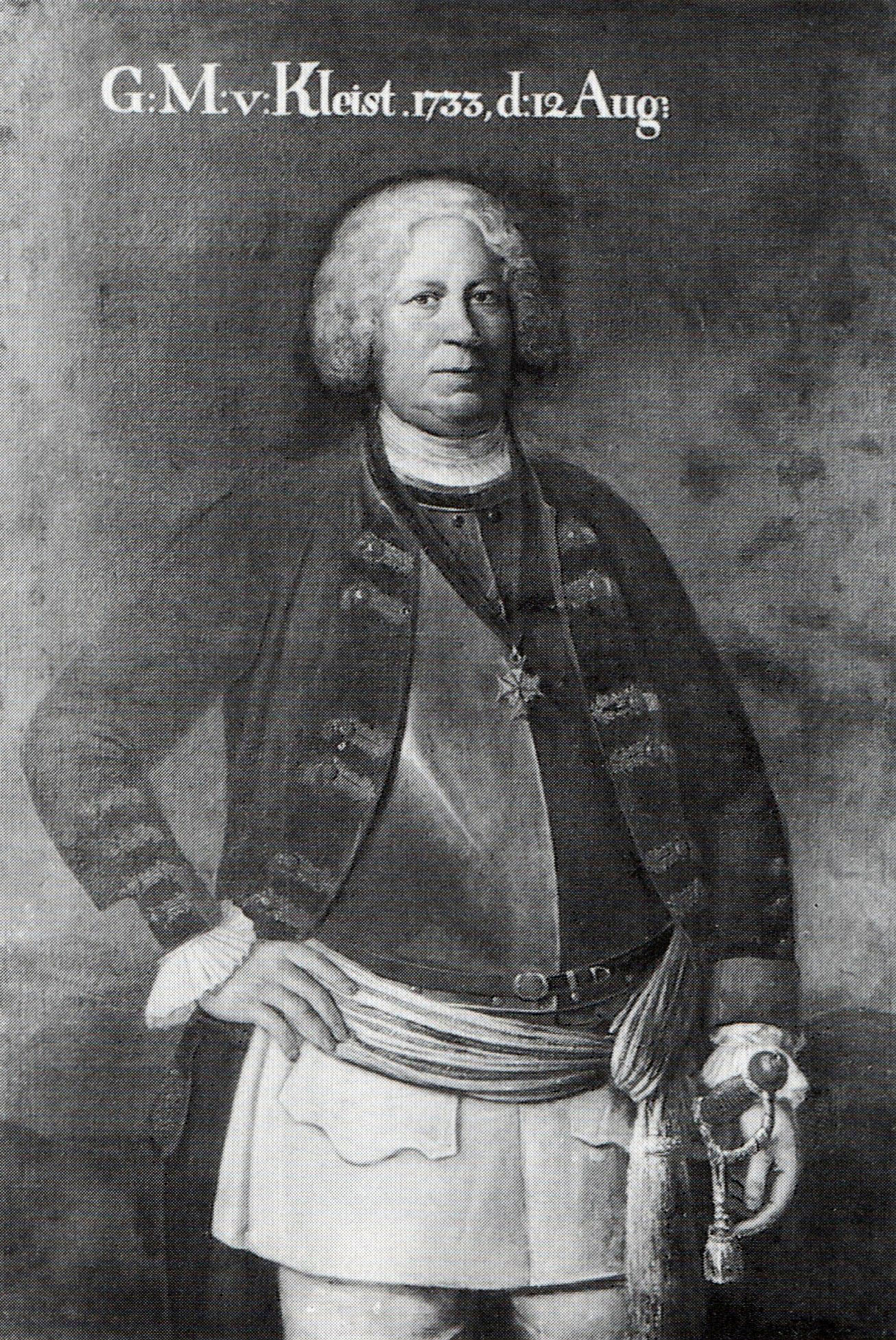
- Henning Alexander von Kleist
- Born: 4 May 1677; Raddatz, Pomerania
- Died: 21 August 1749 (aged 72); Berlin, Prussia
- Spouse: Albertine Marie von Biedersee
- Military career
- Allegiance: Prussia
- Branch: Prussian Army
- Service years: 1699–1747
- Rank: Field Marshal
- Commands: Anhalt (Infantry) Regiment (Regiment Anhalt zu Fuss) (1718–1723); Infantry Regiment No. 26 (1730–1749)
- Conflicts: War of Spanish Succession; Great Northern War: Siege of Stralsund (1711–15); War of the Austrian Succession: Battle of Mollwitz; 2nd Silesian War
- Awards: Order of the Black Eagle; Pour le Merite

Henning Alexander von Kleist (1676/77–1749) was an 18th-century Prussian field marshal. He fought in the War of Spanish Succession, the Great Northern War, and in the Wars of Austrian Succession. In particular, his actions at the Battle of Mollwitz brought him acclaim, although he had long been a stalwart supporter of Prussian military developments by the Prussian kings Frederick (1740–1786) and Frederick William I (1713–1740).

== Family ==
Henning belonged to an old Pomeranian Kleist family that stemmed from the year 1175, and the family served the Duke Bogislaw X, Duke of Pomerania in his wars. In the 14th century, the family divided into three lines, from three brothers. The oldest line was the Dubberow-Tuchow line; the Muttrin-Damen line was second, and the third was Bilnow-Raddatz, which ended in 1784. In total, the Kleist line produced more than 19 generals, and an assortment of poets, inventors, scientists, and philosophers.

Henning Alexander von Kleist was born on 4 May in 1676 or 1677 (Note: Birthdate is disputed and also given as 1676.) in Raddatz in Pomerania. He was the third son of Joachim Daniel von Kleist. and his first wife, Maria Catherine von Ramel. (Note: She was the second daughter of Heinrich von Ramel and Else Sophia von Münchow, from Bulgrin. She died before 1688, and her husband subsequently remarried. See Gustav Kratz, L. Quandt, G. H. KypkeGeschichte des Geschlechts von Kleist - Villnow-Raddatzer Linie. 79–81.)

His father married three times. The first wife, Maria Catherine von Ramel, 18 May 1644, 1672 married, and died 3 January 1685. She was the second daughter of Heinrich von Ramel and Else Sophia von Münchow, from Bulgrin. She bore four sons, and one daughter:

1. Jürgen (died before 1688)
2. Philipp Heinrich. Initially served in Prussian military, but after a duel, left Prussia and settled in Brussels. There he married Antonia Catharine van der Linden on 26 February 1704. He entered French service as a lieutenant in the Regiment de la Mare, fought in the War of Spanish Succession and died on 10 September 1709, in the Battle of Malplaquet. He had one son, Ludwig, who died on 18 May 1780, without legitimate descendants.
3. Henning Alexander (1676–1747)
4. Maria Catherine 10 February 1677, 23 May 1701 married Jürgen Heinrich von Kleist (of Raddtz), 27 February 1753 (in Juchow).
5. Richard Christian, called himself Richard; served in the military, Infantry Regiment Borck (No 33z)., By 7 May 1714, he was Major, 24 July–4 August 1718, stationed in Colberg as commander. 22 October 1718, Lt Colonel with the Infantry Regiment Mosel. Died in Wesel 1723.
6. Leopold, died without male issue.
7. Balthazar Gustav 16 April 1689–8 April 1694.

== Military service ==
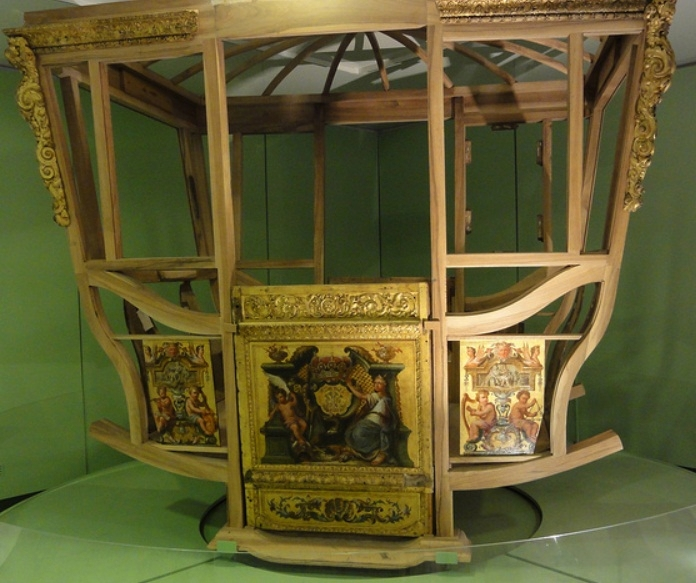
Kleist acquired the carriage of Marie Casimire Sobieska, the wife of Jan Sobieski.

Kleist served in the Prussian military during the reigns of three kings: Frederick I, Frederick William I, and Frederick the Great. He joined the Prussian military in the Alt-Anhalt Regiment in 1698 or 1699, and saw active service continuously from the War of Spanish Succession, which began in 1701, until the Peace of Utrecht in 1713: he served in campaigns in the Netherlands, France and the Italian states under the command of Leopold I, Prince of Anhalt-Dessau, known as the Old Dessauer (der alte Dessauer). Consequently, he learned the military craft under the leadership of one of the foremost infantry commanders of the age. He fought at the memorable Battle of Blenheim in 1704 in the wing commanded by Prince Eugene of Savoy. During the 1704 campaign, he also saw action under the leadership of the legendary Türken-Louis. After the victories in southern Germany, his regiment went to northern Italy, where it participated in the fighting of Cassano in 1705. He also helped to break the siege at Turin in 1706, as part of the relief column that attacked the French army. Subsequently, he served in the Great Northern War (1705–1721), and participated in the lengthy Siege of Stralsund (1711–15). He acquired the patent as Chief (Inhaber) of his regiment in 1718, which he held until retirement in 1723.

In 1726 he was recalled to service by Frederick William I. In 1730 he acquired the patent as proprietor of the Old Prussian Infantry Regiment, which, in 1806 became regiment No. 26. He held that patent until his death in 1749. During the decade of the 1730s, he was in regular communication with the then-Prince Frederick, and became one of his trusted commanders. (Note: Frederick wrote his father that he had visited Kleist and that the colonel was sick with a chest cold. See Fridericus II. rex Borussiae, Friedrichs des Großen, Briefe an seinen Vater geschrieben, in den Jahren 1732–1737... Ernst Siegfried Mittler, 1838, p. 122)

During the War of Austrian Succession, in 1741 as a lieutenant general he commanded the city Kolberg. As a participant in the Battle of Mollwitz, his infantry regiment not only held its line despite the flight of the Prussian cavalry, but subsequently attacked the Austrian line with such ferocity that he and his soldiers received special mention in Kurt Christoph Graf von Schwerin's report. He was wounded in the fighting. The regiment's actions here reflected the iron training imposed by the prince of Anhalt Dessau on his subordinates, and their subsequent training of their own regiments. In addition, the Prussian infantry benefited not only from the discipline of drill but also the latest in military technology; unlike their Austrian counterparts, they had iron ramrods which allowed them to fire faster and more accurately. After the battle, he was made a Knight of the Order of the Black Eagle on 15 April 1741, and later awarded the Order Pour le Mérite. During the Silesian Wars, in 1744 he acquired as war booty the gold-plated carriage originally belonging to Jan Sobieski; Kleist gave the carriage to his local church.

In 1745 Kleist was promoted to General of Infantry and two years later, in 1747, to field marshal, at the conclusion of a grand troop revue. He was promoted at the same time as Count Friedrich Ludwig, Graf zu Dohna-Carwinden, von Kalckstein (Frederick's educator and lifelong Councillor), Joachim Christof von Jeetze and Dietrich of Anhalt-Dessau. He became ill in 1749; von Kleist died on 22 August, at age of 73.

== Descendants ==
Kleist married Albertine Marie von Biedersee, daughter of Georg Burchardt of Biedersee from Ilberstädt, who died on 23 June 1731, after giving birth to a stillborn child. They had seven sons and three daughters.

1. Nicholas Valentine, died as a child.
2. Charlotte Louisa, married Conrad von der Golz
3. Friedrich Wilhelm, born c January 1718. (Note: On 13 January 1718, the father wrote to the king from Halle, "As one son is taken from me, another one fills his place. " The King served as godfather of the child.) but this child also died young.
4. Leopold, born 29 January 1719 in Hall. He entered military service in the Munchow regiment (later regiment No. 36) on 7 September 1738, and was promoted to first lieutenant on 6 August 1741. He attained the rank of colonel, and died in 1787 in Neuenhagen bei Cöslin.
5. Wilhelmine Philippine, born 1720, 1745 married War and Land Minister Georg Ernst
6. Helene Albertine Christiane, born 1722, in 174 married the Colonel of the Watch Casimir Ernst von Schmeling.
7. Friedrich Albrecht Christian. 21 December 1723–11 March 1724
8. Wilhelm Alexander 1724–19 February 1725.
9. Alexander Ludwig 25 October 1725–20 May 1751.
10. Wilhelm Christoph, 1 August 1727. As a 19-year-old, he entered the Holy Orders of the Knights of St. John. In 1749, he volunteered as a freicorporal in the Regiment of Major General Haut Charmon, known on 8 June the following year as Gefreiter Corporal Wilhelm Christoph. He eventually inherited the family properties of Raddatz line. He purchased a position as an ensign in 1755. In the Seven Years' War he was a captain of the Pomeranian battalion Stosch, and served from 1760–1762. He advanced to the position of major before he left military service. In 1768 he lived in Dutzerow, a property he purchased. He married three times. He had a son with one wife, but she died in 1760 with the boy. The male Raddatzline ended in 1793, with his death.

=== Other family ===
His nephew, also named Henning Alexander von Kleist, the son of his sister Maria Katharine (married Johan Daniel von Kleist), also served in the Prussian military (1724–?.)

Promotions

- 1699 Ensign Infantry Regiment No. 3
- 1702 Lieutenant
- 1705 Captain (company commander)
- 1709 Major
- 1712 Amtshauptmann (territorial captain) of Zossen und Trebbin
- 1713 Lieutenant Colonel
- 1718 Colonel, Commander Infantry Regiment No. 3, Knight of the Order de la Générosité
- 1722 demilitarized (retired)
- 1726 re-hired, Lt. Colonel Infantry Regiment No. 26
- 1730 Colonel old Prussian Infantry Regiment No. 26
- 1733 Major General
- 1741 Lieutenant General, Governor of Kolberg, Knight of the Black Eagle, Orden Pour le Mérite
- 1745 General of Infantry
- 1747 Field Marshal

== Literature ==
- König, Anton Balthasar, Henning Alexander von Kleist, Biographisches Lexikon aller Helden und Militärpersonen: T. G-L, A. Wever, 1789.
- Kypke, "Kleist, Henning Alexander von" in: Allgemeine Deutsche Biographie 16 (1882), S. 150–151 [Onlinefassung]; Henning Alexander von Kleist. Accessed 26 September 2015.
