= Henning Alexander von Kleist (1707–1784) =

Prussian Lieutenant General and Commander of the Spandau Citadel

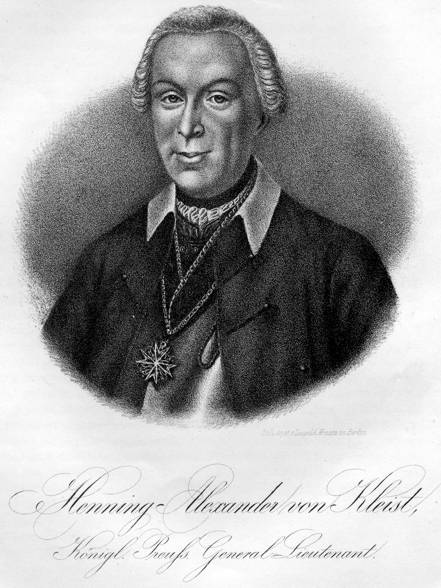
- Born: 4 April 1707; Raddatz, Pomerania
- Died: 20 January 1784 (aged 76); Spandau
- Military career
- Allegiance: Prussia
- Branch: Prussian Army
- Service years: 1721–1784
- Rank: Lieutenant General
- Conflicts: War of the Austrian Succession; 2nd Silesian War; Seven Years' War
- Awards: Pour le Merite
- Other work: Governor of Spandau Citadel

Henning Alexander von Kleist (4 June 1707 in Raddatz–20 January 1784 in Spandau) was a Prussian Lieutenant-General and Chief of Fusiliers. He was a winner of the Order Pour le Merite and hereditary lord of properties at Juchow, Zammenz and Falkenhagen. He was also Governor of the Spandau Citadel.

== Military service ==
Kleist belonged to an old Pomeranian family that stemmed from the year 1175, and the family served the Duke Bogislaw X, Duke of Pomerania in his wars. In the 14th century, the family divided into two stems: the Raddatzer line, and the Wilanow line. The latter line died out in the first quarter of the sixteenth century.

His parents were Georg Jürgen von Kleist (17 July 1674 – 30 May 1743) (House Raddatz) and Maria Katharina (née von Kleist) (4 June 1676 – 26 March 1754). His maternal uncle Henning Alexander von Kleist took him in 24 February 1721 as a cadet into his infantry regiment, then called the Old Anhalt regiment. Because his uncle was released from military service in the same year, he entered the military academy in Berlin in November 1721. He was released on 6 September 1724, and was a cadet in the Regiment Glasenapp. On 24 January 1726, he was commissioned by King Frederick William I as Freikorporal (volunteer) in his "King Regiment" in Potsdam. In 1730 he was an ensign in the regiment and by 1735 second lieutenant. With the reign of II Friedrich the Great, he was the most senior first lieutenant; when the third battalion was added to the regiment, on 24 May 1741, he was promoted to Staff Captain. As such, he also fought in the First Silesian War. On 30 March 1743 he got his company in "Regiment Gröben zu Fuss". In the Second Silesian War, in 1744, he served during the Siege of Prague, and at the battles of Habelschwerdt and Catholic–Hennersdorf and the battles of Hohenfriedberg and Soor.

Promotions

- 1724 Cadet Infantry Regiment Glasenapp
- 1726 Freicorps Corporal in King's Regiment in Potsdam.
- 1733 Ensign, King's Regiment
- 1735 Second lieutenant, King's Regiment
- 1740 First Lieutenant
- 1741 Captain (company commander), Regiment Gröben zu Fuss
- 1756 Major
- 1758 Commander of the Regiment
- 1760 Lieutenant Colonel
- 1761 Colonel
- 1766 Colonel Fusilier Regiment Münchow
- 1767 Major General
- 1778 Lt. general
- 1780, retired, Commander of Spandau Citadel

On 7 July 1756 he was promoted to major and, in 1758, commander of the regiment, which now called "Thadden zu Fuss". In the Seven Years' War, he fought in the Battle of Gross-Jägersdorf and Battle of Zorndorf (1758). In 1759 he fought mainly in Pomerania and Mecklenburg, 1761 in Saxony and Silesia, and, in 1762, in Silesia. On 21 July he led two partial regiments in storming the Leutmannsdorf Hill during the Battle of Burkersdorf and was rewarded for this courage with the Order Pour le Mérite.

In 1760 he was promoted to lieutenant colonel and on 6 February 1761, to colonel. On 16 June 1766 he acquired the patent as Inhaber of the "Fusilier Regiment Münchow" upon the death of the previous proprietor, Gustav Bogislav von Münchow. On 9 July 1767, he was appointed major general. On 6 April 1778 he was raised to lieutenant general. He asked for retirement, which was granted on 9 July 1780. He subsequently served as Governor of the Spandau Citadel, a post he held until his death.

== Family ==
He married his second cousin, Charlotte Christine von Kleist (9 October 1725 – 13 February 1765), daughter of Lieutenant-General Franz Ulrich von Kleist. The couple had the following children:

1. Carl Friedrich Ulrich (1749 – 19 July 1757)
2. Marie Sophie Charlotte ∞ 1767 von Buttler
3. Hans Alexander Ernst ( August 1751 – 29 September 1751)
4. Christine Louise Amalie (21 November 1753 – 20 April 1765)
5. Anna Catharina Elizabeth (30 September 1756 – 3 December 1823); 22 February 1775 ∞ Jacob Georg Gottlieb von Puttkamer (6 July 1748 – 4 November 1823)
6. Alexandrine Wilhelmine Ernstine (13 January 1765 – 28 February 1765)

After the death of his first wife, he married in 1766 to Ursula Louise von Kunheim (April 1732 – 1 May 1812). She was the widow of Felix Andreas von Below (1707– 1755) and daughter of the War Minister Johann Dietrich von Kunheim. The couple had the following children:

1. Marie Louise Albertine Eleonore (7 March 1768 – 13 October 1836) ∞ 23 November 1792 Philipp Wilhelm Heinrich von Borcke (8 October 1757 – 4 October 1824)
2. Friederike Ernstine (14 December 1770 – 28 June 1834) ∞ 5 April 1799 Friedrich Wilhelm Christian von Westphalen
3. Louise Alexandrine (January 1771 – 9 September 1847) ∞ 31 May 1813 of Kosnicki (Koschnitzky)
