= Ewald Christian von Kleist =

German poet and noble (1715–1759)

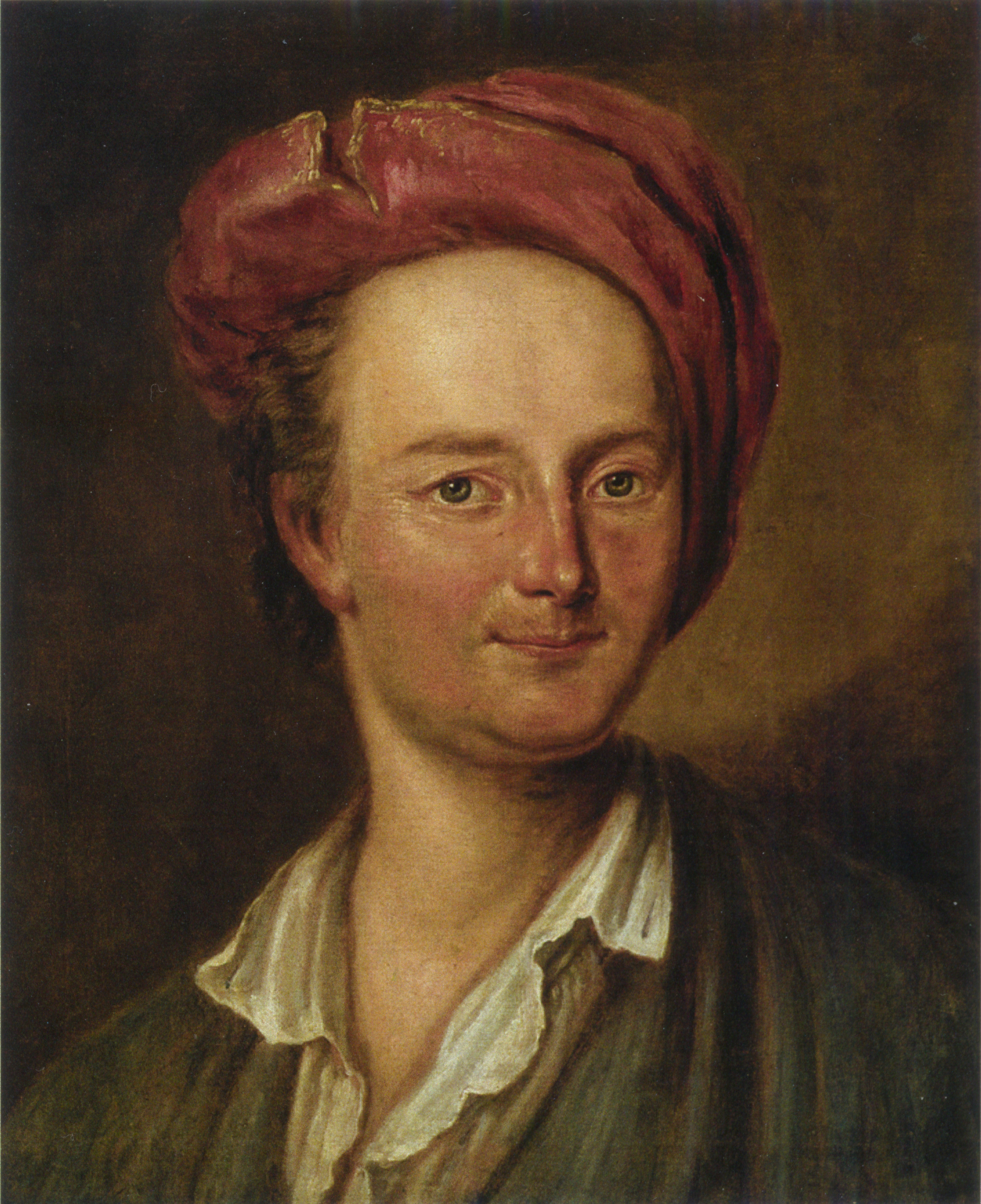
Ewald Christian von Kleist

Ewald Christian von Kleist (7 March 1715 – 24 August 1759) was a German poet and cavalry officer. His vast family was well-established in Farther Pomerania; 58 male members of his family fought in Frederick the Great's army of the Seven Years' War. Kleist was born at Zeblin, near Köslin (Koszalin) in Farther Pomerania, to the von Kleist family of cavalry leaders.

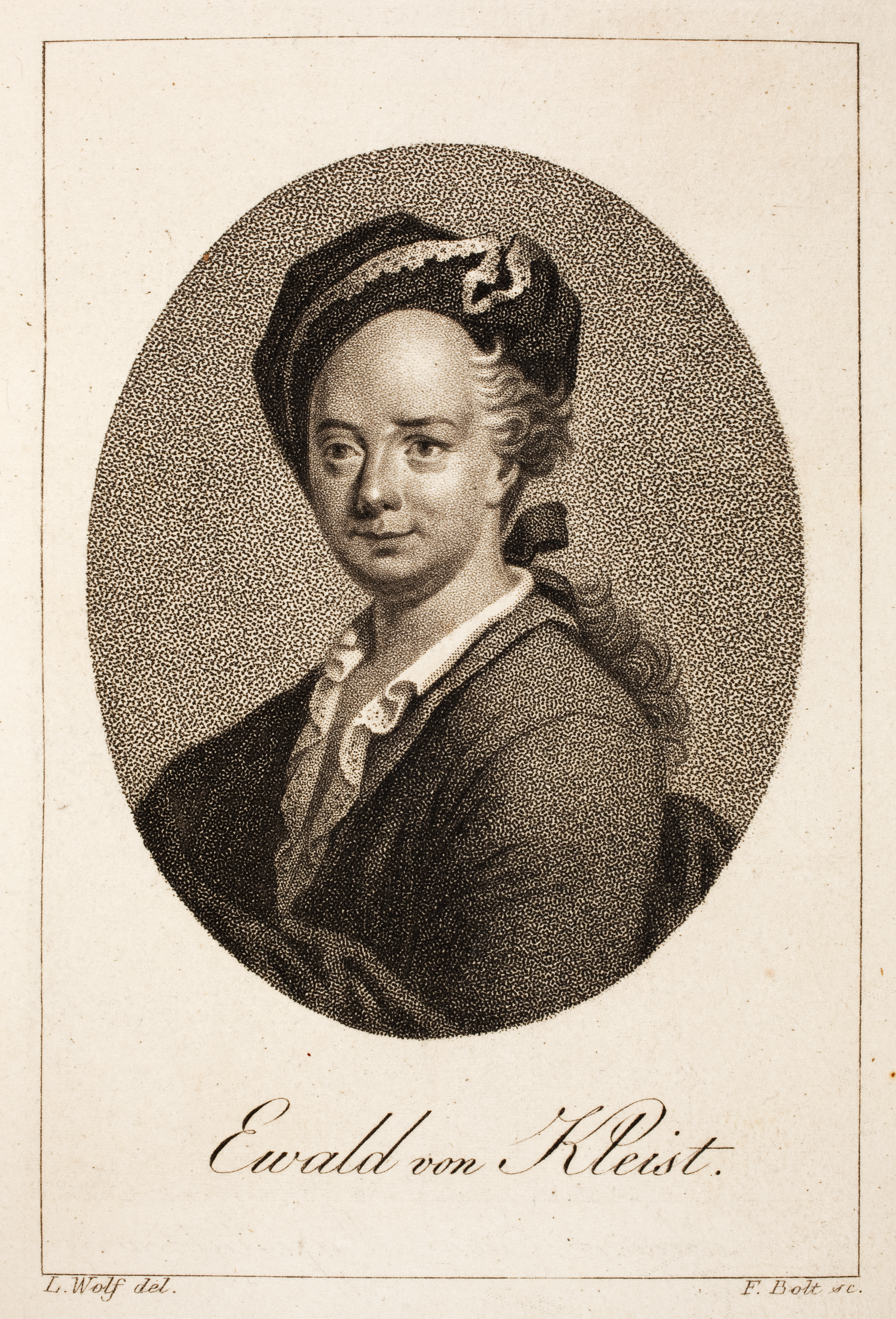
Ewald Christian von Kleist

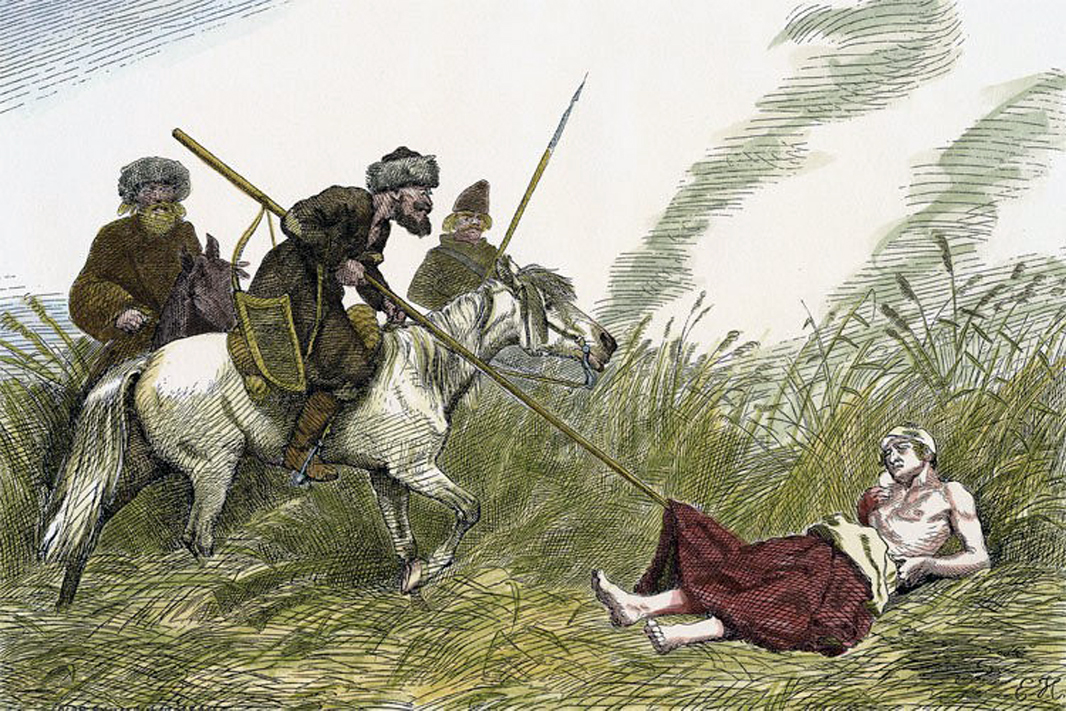
The death of Kleist, wood cut after an original by Emil Hünten

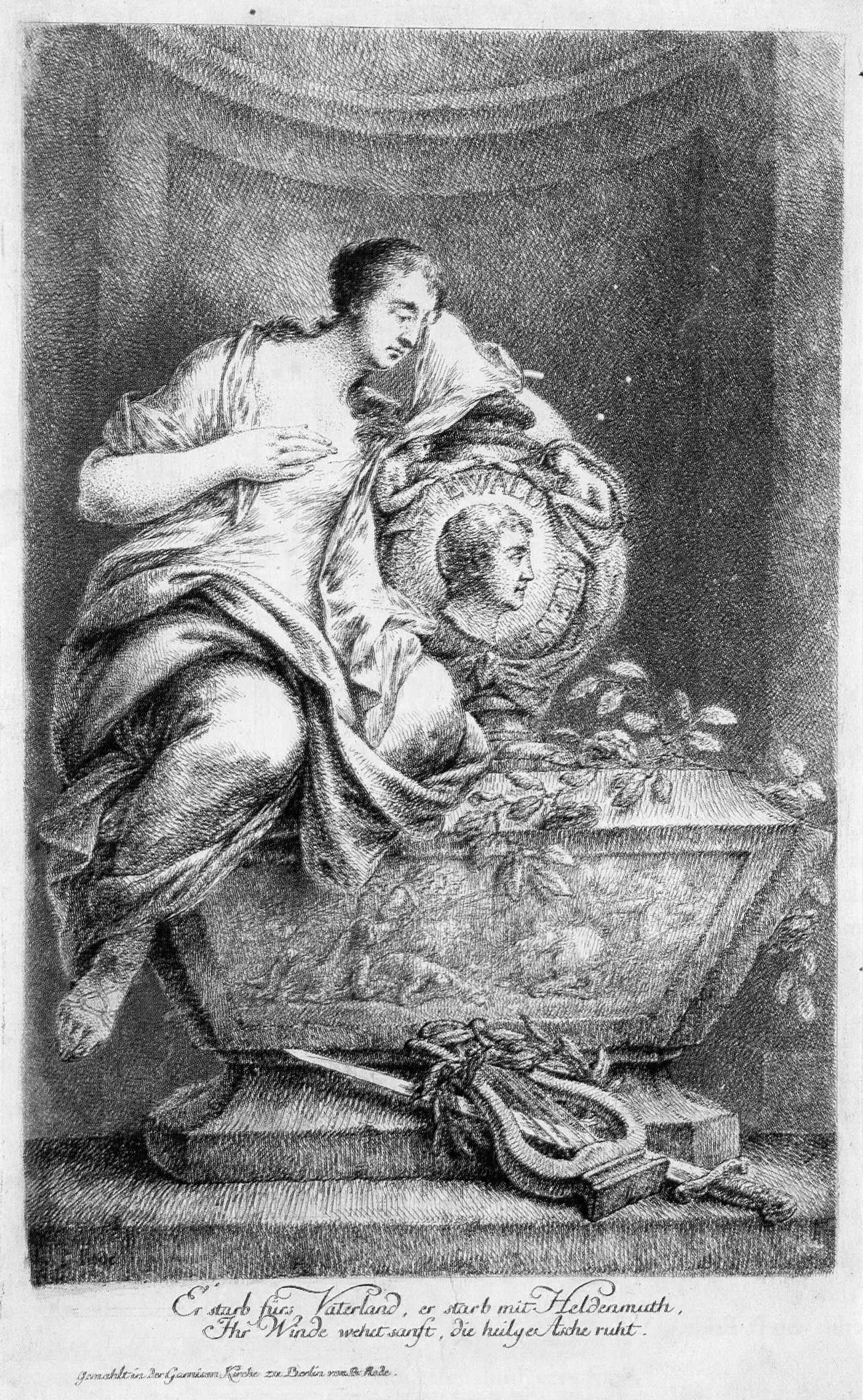
Kleist's epitaph for Heinrich von Blumenthal is repeated for Kleist himself in this memorial etching

== Family ==
The Kleist family is an old, established one in Farther Pomerania whose roots date to the 12th century. Kleist's father, Joachim Ewald (1684–1738), son of Ewald von Kleist (died 1694), had been born on the family estate. On 7 July 1710, he married Marie Juliane von Manteuffel (sister of Heinrich von Manteuffel) from Groß-Poplow (near Polzin, in the district of Belgard). She died on 9 November 1719 after the birth of the sixth child.

Ewald Christian, the third child of this marriage, lived with his only brother, Franz Casimir, one year older, at the estate of a paternal uncle, Christian von Manteuffel, in Groß-Poplow. Both boys attended the Jesuit school in Deutsch Krone (now Wałcz, Poland) and subsequently, in 1729, the Danzig Gymnasium; in 1731 Ewald von Kleist advanced to the University of Königsberg, where he studied law and mathematics. Either on the completion of his studies, or because his father was unhappy with the direction his studies took (he insisted on studying theology and modern languages and classics as well as law and mathematics) he entered the Danish army, in which he became an officer in 1736. He served in a unit commanded by a friend of his father.

In 1738 he was sent to Gdańsk to visit his father and sister, as well as to his good friend Battrow (north-east of Flatow), a distant relative, the widowed chief of Goltz, whose daughter Wilhelmine made an impression on him; he became betrothed to her, but they were separated by his military service and she married another man.

== Military service ==
Recalled to Prussia by King Frederick II in 1740, he was appointed lieutenant in a newly formed regiment stationed at Potsdam, where he became acquainted with J. W. L. Gleim, who interested him in poetry. After distinguishing himself at the Battle of Mollwitz (10 April 1741) and the siege of Neisse (1741), he was promoted to captain in 1749 and major in 1756.

Quartered during the winter of 1757–1758 in Leipzig during the Seven Years' War, he found relief from his irksome military duties in the society of Gotthold Ephraim Lessing. His regiment, the Schenckendorff Grenadiers, entered into summer campaigns. Shortly afterwards in the Battle of Kunersdorf, on 12 August 1759, he was mortally wounded in the forefront of the attack. Thomas Carlyle offers a description of his death, possibly apocryphal: Kleist was attached to Finck's division at the Prussian right. He'd been hit several times by ricochets, and possibly musket balls, perhaps even 12 times. He continued to lead his troops forward, taking a third battery, when he was badly hurt on both arms. His "colonel" (Major Mark K. A. von Schwartz) fell; he led his regiment forward to the fourth battery when a case-shot smashed his leg into pieces; once he fell, Captain Sylvius von Swolinsky took command of the battalion. He fell from his horse, and was carried to the rear. In due course, a surgeon was brought to him, but was killed by case-shot. One of his friends tried to send a carriage to him, to move him out of danger, but it took so long he was cut off by the Russian advance. By evening, the Cossacks stripped him bare, and threw him into the nearest swamp. Later that night some Russian Hussars found Kleist in this situation, took him to a dry place, set a watch fire and gave him some bread. When they had left, the Cossacks returned and took the blanket the Russians had given him. Eventually a Russian cavalry troop passed by; one of their captains, had him sent to Frankfurt in a carriage. Under the care of a professor there, he had surgery and good nursing, although on the tenth night, the bone fell apart, cut an artery, and at 2 a.m. on the 24th he died. He received a soldier's funeral, his coffin borne by 12 Russian grenadiers, and attended by some officers; one staff officer laid his own sword on the bier.

== Poetry ==
Kleist's chief work is a poem in hexameters, Der Frühling (1749), for which Thomson's Seasons largely supplied ideas. It earned him the nickname "the Poet of the Spring." He noted in his letters that Carl Wilhelm Ramler had given him belated commentary and improvements on his poem, which he self-published in December 1749. Subsequently, his poem received considerable notice, even from Pierre-Louis Moreau de Maupertuis.

Kleist also wrote some odes, idylls and elegies, and a small epic poem, Cissides und Paches (1759), the subject being two Thessalian friends who die an heroic death for their country in a battle against the Athenians. Likewise, he composed epitaphs for his many friends who were killed in battle, such as Major Heinrich von Blumenthal, which eerily foretold his own:

Witz, Einsicht, Wissenschaft, Geschmack, Bescheidenheit,
und Menschenlieb und Tapferkeit,
und alle Tugenden vereint mit allen Gaben
besass der, den man hier begraben.
Er starb für's Vaterland
er starb mit Heldenmuth.
Ihr Winde wehet sanft,
die heilige Asche ruht.

Translation:

Wit, sense, a mind scientific, good taste and modesty
and kindliness and gallantry,
and all the gifts and all the virtues
possessed he who here buried is.
He died a patriot,
he died a hero true.
Oh winds be gentle, hold your breath
let holy ashes rest in death.

Kleist published in 1756 the first collection of his Gedichte, which was followed by a second in 1758. After his death his friend Karl Wilhelm Ramler published an edition of Kleist's Sämtliche Werke in 2 vols (1760). A critical edition was published by August Sauer, in 3 vols (1880–1882). See also Arthur Chuquet, De Ewaldi Kleistii vita et scriptis (Paris, 1887), and Heinrich Pröhle, Friedrich der Grosse und die deutsche Literatur (1872).

Research places the three Kleist poets—Ewald, Franz Alexander von Kleist and Heinrich von Kleist to the same forefather at the start of the 15th century.
